= List of Cicadidae genera =

There are about 469 genera of cicadas in the family Cicadidae.

- Abagazara Distant, 1905^{c g}
- Abricta Stål, 1866^{c g}
- Abroma Stål, 1866^{i c g}
- Aceropyga Duffels, 1977^{c g}
- Acuticephala Torres, 1958^{i c g}
- Acyroneura Torres, 1958^{i c g}
- Adelia Moulds, 2012^{c g}
- Adeniana Distant, 1906^{c g}
- Aedeastria de Boer, 1990^{c g}
- Aestuansella Boulard, 1981^{c g}
- Aetanna Lee, 2014^{c g}
- Afzeliada Boulard, 1973^{c g}
- Ahomana Distant, 1905^{i c g}
- Akamba Distant, 1905^{c g}
- Alarcta Torres, 1958^{i c g}
- Albanycada Villet, 1989^{c g}
- Aleeta Moulds, 2003^{c g}
- Allobroma Duffels, 2011^{c g}
- Ambragaeana Chou & Yao, 1985^{c g}
- Amphipsalta Fleming, 1969^{c g}
- Anapsaltoda Ashton, 1921^{c g}
- Angamiana Distant, 1890^{c g}
- Anopercalna Boulard, 2008^{c g}
- Antankaria Distant, 1904^{c g}
- Aola Distant, 1905
- Aragualna Champanhet, Boulard and Gaiani, 2000^{i c g}
- Arcystasia Distant, 1882^{c g}
- Arenopsaltria Ashton, 1921^{c g}
- Arfaka Distant, 1905^{c g}
- Ariasa Distant, 1905^{i c g}
- Arunta Distant, 1904^{c g}
- Atrapsalta Owen & Moulds, 2016^{c g}
- Attenuella Boulard, 1973^{c g}
- Auritibicen Lee, 2015^{c g}
- Auscala Moulds, 2012^{c g}
- Auta Distant, 1897^{c g}
- Ayesha Distant, 1905^{c g}
- Ayuthia Distant, 1919^{c g}
- Azanicada Villet, 1989^{c g}
- Babras Jacobi, 1907^{i c g}
- Baeturia Stål, 1866^{c g}
- Bafutalna Boulard, 1993^{c g}
- Balinta Distant, 1905^{c g}
- Basa Distant, 1905^{c g}
- Bavea Distant, 1905^{c g}
- Beameria Davis, 1934^{i c g b}
- Becquartina Kato, 1940^{c g}
- Berberigetta Costa, Nunes, Marabuto, Mendes & Simões, 2017^{c g}
- Bergalna Boulard & Martinelli, 1996^{i c g}
- Bijaurana Distant, 1912^{c g}
- Birrima Distant, 1906^{c g}
- Bispinalta Delorme, 2017^{c g}
- Biura Lee & Sanborn, 2015^{c g}
- Borencona Davis, 1928^{i c g}
- Brachylobopyga Duffels, 1982^{c g}
- Brevisiana Boulard, 1973^{c g}
- Burbunga Distant, 1905^{c g}
- Buyisa Distant, 1907^{c g}
- Cabecita Lee, 2014^{c g}
- Cacama Distant, 1904^{i c g b} (cactus dodgers)
- Calcagninus Distant, 1889^{c g}
- Caledopsalta Delorme & In Press^{c g}
- Caliginopsalta Ewart, 2005^{c g}
- Calliopsida Torres, 1958^{i c g}
- Callogaeana Chou & Yao, 1985^{c g}
- Calopsaltria Stål, 1862^{c g}
- Calyria Stål, 1862^{i c g}
- Canualna Boulard, 1985^{c g}
- Capcicada Villet, 1989^{c g}
- Carineta Amyot and Serville, 1843^{i c g}
- Cephalalna Boulard, 2006^{c g}
- Chalumalna Boulard, 1998^{i c g}
- Champaka Distant, 1905^{c g}
- Changa Lee, 2016^{c g}
- Chelapsalta Moulds, 2012^{c g}
- Chilecicada Sanborn, 2014^{c g}
- Chinaria Davis, 1934^{i c g}
- Chlorocysta Westwood, 1851^{c g}
- Chloropsalta Haupt, 1920^{c g}
- Chonosia Distant, 1905^{i c g}
- Chremistica Stål, 1870^{c g}
- Chrysocicada Boulard, 1989^{c g}
- Chrysolasia Moulds, 2003^{i c g}
- Cicada Linnaeus, 1758^{i c g}
- Cicadatra Kolenati, 1857^{c g}
- Cicadetta Kolenati, 1857^{i c g b} (small grass cicadas)
- Cicadettana Marshall & Hill, 2017^{c g}
- Cicadmalleus Boulard & Puissant, 2013^{c g}
- Clidophleps Van Duzee, 1915^{i c g}
- Clinata Moulds, 2012^{c g}
- Clinopsalta Moulds, 2012^{c g}
- Coata Distant, 1906^{i c g}
- Cochleopsaltria Pham & Constant, 2017
- Conibosa Distant, 1905^{i c g}
- Cornuplura Davis, 1944^{i c g b}
- Cosmopsaltria Stål, 1866^{c g}
- Cracenpsaltria Sanborn, 2016^{c g}
- Crassisternalna Boulard, 1980^{c g}
- Crassopsaltria Boulard, 2008^{c g}
- Crotopsalta Ewart, 2005^{c g}
- Cryptotympana Stål, 1862^{c g}
- Curvicicada Chou & Lu, 1997^{c g}
- Cyclochila Amyot & Serville, 1843^{c g}
- Cystopsaltria Goding & Froggatt, 1904^{c g}
- Cystosoma Westwood, 1842^{c g}
- Davispia Cooper, 1941^{c g}
- Daza Distant, 1905^{i c g}
- Decebalus Distant, 1920^{c g}
- Derotettix Berg, 1882^{i c g}
- Diceroprocta Stål, 1870^{i c g b} (scrub cicadas)
- Diceropyga Stål, 1870^{c g}
- Diemeniana Distant, 1906^{c g}
- Dilobopyga Duffels, 1977^{c g}
- Dimissalna Boulard, 2007^{c g}
- Dinarobia Mamet, 1957^{c g}
- Dipsopsalta Moulds, 2012^{c g}
- Distantada Orian, 1964^{c g}
- Distantalna Boulard, 2009^{c g}
- Dorachosa Distant, 1892^{i c g}
- Dorisiana Metcalf, 1952^{i c g}
- Drymopsalta Ewart, 2005^{c g}
- Dulderana Distant, 1905^{i c g}
- Dundubia Amyot & Serville, 1843^{c g}
- Durangona Distant, 1911^{i c g}
- Elachysoma Torres, 1964^{i c g}
- Elassoneura Torres, 1964^{i c g}
- Emathia Stål, 1866^{c g}
- Erempsalta Moulds, 2012^{c g}
- Esada Boulard, 1973^{c g}
- Euboeana Gogala, Trilar & Drosopoulos, 2011^{c g}
- Euryphara Horváth, 1912^{c g}
- Euterpnosia Matsumura, 1917^{c g}
- Euthemopsaltria Moulds, 2014^{c g}
- Ewartia Moulds, 2012^{c g}
- Falcatpsalta Owen & Moulds, 2016^{c g}
- Fidicina Amyot & Audinet-Serville, 1843^{i c g}
- Fidicinoides Boulard & Martinelli, 1996^{i c g}
- Fijipsalta Duffels, 1988^{c g}
- Formocicada Lee & Hayashi, 2004^{c g}
- Formosemia Matsumura, 1917^{c g}
- Formotosena Kato, 1925^{c g}
- Fractuosella Boulard, 1979^{c g}
- Froggattoides Distant, 1910^{c g}
- Gaeana Amyot & Serville, 1843^{c g}
- Gagatopsalta Ewart, 2005^{c g}
- Galanga Moulds, 2012^{c g}
- Galgoria Lee, 2016^{c g}
- Gazuma Distant, 1905^{c g}
- Gelidea Moulds, 2012^{c g}
- Germalna Delorme
- Ggomapsalta Lee, 2009^{c g}
- Glaucopsaltria Goding & Froggatt, 1904^{c g}
- Graminitigrina Ewart & Marques, 2008^{c g}
- Graptopsaltria Motschulsky, 1866^{c g}
- Graptotettix Stål, 1866^{c g}
- Guaranisaria Distant, 1905^{i c g}
- Gudaba Distant, 1906^{c g}
- Gudanga Distant, 1905^{c g}
- Guineapsaltria de Boer, 1993^{c g}
- Guyalna Boulard & Martinelli, 1996^{i c g}
- Gymnotympana Stål, 1862^{c g}
- Hadoa Moulds, 2015^{c g b} (western annual cicadas)
- Haemopsalta Owen & Moulds, 2016^{c g}
- Hainanosemia Kato, 1927^{c g}
- Hamza Distant, 1904^{c g}
- Haphsa Distant, 1905^{c g}
- Hea Distant, 1906^{c g}
- Heliopsalta Moulds, 2012^{c g}
- Hemidictya Burmeister, 1835^{i c g}
- Hemisciera Amyot & Audinet-Serville, 1843^{i c g}
- Henicopsaltria Stål, 1866^{c g}
- Henicotettix Stål, 1858^{c g}
- Herrera Distant, 1905^{i c g}
- Heteropsaltria Jacobi, 1902^{c g}
- Hilaphura Webb, 1979^{c g}
- Hovana Distant, 1905^{c g}
- Huechys Amyot & Serville, 1843^{c g}
- Hyalessa China, 1925^{c g}
- Hyantia Stål, 1866^{i c g}
- Hyantiini Distant, 1905: 304. n. syn^{i}
- Hylora Boulard, 1971^{c g}
- Illyria Moulds, 1985^{c g}
- Imbabura Distant, 1911^{i c g}
- Inflatopyga Duffels, 1997^{c g}
- Inthaxara Distant, 1913^{c g}
- Ioba Distant, 1904^{c g}
- Iruana Distant, 1905^{c g}
- Jacatra Distant, 1905^{c g}
- Jafuna Distant, 1912^{c g}
- Jassopsaltria Ashton, 1914^{c g}
- Juanaria Distant, 1920^{i c g}
- Kageralna Boulard, 2012^{c g}
- Kalabita Moulton, 1923^{c g}
- Kamalata Distant, 1889^{c g}
- Kanakia Distant, 1892^{c g}
- Kaphsa Lee, 2012^{c g}
- Karenia Distant, 1888^{c g}
- Karscheliana Boulard, 1990^{c g}
- Katoa Ôuchi, 1938^{c g}
- Khimbya Distant, 1905^{c g}
- Kikihia Dugdale, 1971^{c g}
- Klapperichicen Dlabola, 1957^{c g}
- Kobonga Distant, 1906^{c g}
- Koma Distant, 1904^{c g}
- Kongota Distant, 1904^{c g}
- Koranna Distant, 1905^{c g}
- Kosemia Matsumura, 1927^{c g}
- Kumanga Distant, 1905^{c g}
- Lacetas Karsch, 1890^{c g}
- Lahugada Distant, 1905^{c g}
- Lamotialna Boulard, 1976^{c g}
- Lembeja Distant, 1892^{c g}
- Lemuriana Distant, 1905^{c g}
- Leptopsaltria Stål, 1866^{c g}
- Leptosemia Matsumura, 1917^{c g}
- Lethama Distant, 1905^{c g}
- Ligymolpa Karsch, 1890^{c g}
- Limnopsalta Moulds, 2012^{c g}
- Linguacicada Chou & Lu, 1997^{c g}
- Luangwana Distant, 1914^{c g}
- Lycurgus China, 1925^{c g}
- Lyristes Horváth, 1926^{g}
- Macrosemia Kato, 1925^{c g}
- Macrotristria Stål, 1870^{c g}
- Magicicada Davis, 1925^{i c g b} (periodical cicadas)
- Majeorona Distant, 1905^{i c g}
- Malagasia Distant, 1882^{c g}
- Malgachialna Boulard, 1980^{c g}
- Malgotilia Boulard, 1980^{c g}
- Malloryalna Sanborn, 2016^{c g}
- Manna Lee & Emery, 2013^{c g}
- Maoricicada Dugdale, 1971^{c g}
- Mapondera Distant, 1905^{c g}
- Mariekea De Jong & de Boer, 2004^{c g}
- Maroboduus Distant, 1920^{c g}
- Marteena Moulds, 1986^{c g}
- Masamia Lee & Emery, 2013^{c g}
- Masupha Distant, 1892^{c g}
- Mata Distant, 1906^{c g}
- Maua Distant, 1905^{c g}
- Megapomponia Boulard, 2005^{c g}
- Megatibicen Sanborn & Heath, 2016^{c g b}
- Meimuna Distant, 1905^{c g}
- Melampsalta Amyot, 1847^{c g}
- Melanesiana Delorme, 2017^{g}
- Mendozana Distant, 1906^{i c g}
- Minilomia Lee, 2013^{c g}
- Minipomponia Boulard, 2008^{c g}
- Miniterpnosia Lee, 2013^{c g}
- Mirabilopsaltria de Boer, 1996^{c g}
- Miranha Distant, 1905^{i c g}
- Moana Myers, 1928^{c g}
- Mogannia Amyot & Audinet-Serville, 1843^{c g}
- Monomatapa Distant, 1897^{c g}
- Mosaica Lee & Emery, 2013^{c g}
- Mouia Distant, 1920^{c g}
- Muansa Distant, 1904^{c g}
- Muda Distant, 1897^{c g}
- Mugadina Moulds, 2012^{c g}
- Munza Distant, 1904^{c g}
- Mura Distant, 1905^{i c g}
- Murmurillana Delorme, 2016^{c g}
- Murphyalna Boulard, 2012^{c g}
- Musimoia China, 1929^{c g}
- Musoda Karsch, 1890^{c g}
- Myersalna Boulard, 1988^{c g}
- Myopsalta Moulds, 2012^{c g}
- Nabalua Moulton, 1923^{c g}
- Nablistes Karsch, 1891^{c g}
- Nanopsalta Moulds, 2012^{c g}
- Nelcyndana Distant, 1906^{c g}
- Neocicada Kato, 1932^{i c g b}
- Neomuda Distant, 1920^{c g}
- Neoncotympana Lee, 2011^{c g}
- Neoplatypedia Davis, 1920^{i c g}
- Neopsaltoda Distant, 1910^{c g}
- Neopunia Moulds, 2012^{c g}
- Neoterpnosia Lee & Emery, 2014^{c g}
- Neotibicen Hill & Moulds, 2015^{c g b} (annual or dogday cicadas)
- Nggeliana Boulard, 1979^{c g}
- Nigripsaltria de Boer, 1999^{c g}
- Noongara Moulds, 2012^{c g}
- Nosola Stål, 1866^{i c g}
- Notopsalta Dugdale, 1971^{c g}
- Novemcella Goding, 1925^{i c g}
- Nyara Villet, 1999^{c g}
- Odopoea Stål, 1861^{i c g}
- Okanagana Distant, 1905^{i c g}
- Okanagodes Davis, 1919^{i c g}
- Oligoglena Horváth, 1912^{c g}
- Ollanta Distant, 1905^{i c g}
- Oncotympana Stål, 1870^{c g}
- Onomacritus Distant, 1912^{c g}
- Onoralna Boulard, 1996^{i c g}
- Orapa Distant, 1905^{c g}
- Orellana Distant, 1905^{i c g}
- Orialella Metcalf, 1952^{i c g}
- Orientopsaltria Kato, 1944^{c g}
- Oudeboschia Distant, 1920^{c g}
- Owra Ashton, 1912^{c g}
- Oxypleura Amyot & Audinet-Serville, 1843^{c g}
- Pacarina Distant, 1905^{i c g b}
- Pachypsaltria Stål, 1863^{i c g}
- Paectira Karsch, 1890^{c g}
- Pagiphora Horvath, 1912^{c g}
- Paharia Distant, 1905^{c g}
- Pakidetta Sanborn & Ahmed, 2017^{c g}
- Palapsalta Moulds, 2012^{c g}
- Panialna Delorme, 2016^{c g}
- Panka Distant, 1905^{c g}
- Papuapsaltria Boer, 1995^{c g}
- Paradina Moulds, 2012^{c g}
- Paranistria Metcalf, 1952^{c g}
- Paranosia Lee, 2014^{c g}
- Paratalainga He, 1984^{c g}
- Paratanna Lee, 2012^{c g}
- Parnisa Stål, 1862^{i c g}
- Parnkalla Distant, 1905^{c g}
- Parnquila Moulds, 2012^{c g}
- Parvittya Distant, 1905^{c g}
- Paulaudalna Delorme, 2017^{c g}
- Pauropsalta Goding & Froggatt, 1904^{c g}
- Philipsalta Lee, Marshall & Hill^{c g}
- Physeema Moulds, 2012^{c g}
- Pictila Moulds, 2012^{c g}
- Pinheya Dlabola, 1963^{c g}
- Pipilopsalta Ewart, 2005^{c g}
- Platylomia Stål, 1870^{c g}
- Platypedia Uhler, 1888^{i c g}
- Platypleura Amyot & Audinet-Serville, 1843^{c g}
- Platypsalta Moulds, 2012^{c g}
- Plautilla Stål, 1865^{i c g}
- Plerapsalta Moulds, 2012^{c g}
- Polyneura Westwood, 1840^{c g}
- Pompanonia Boulard, 1982^{i c g}
- Pomponia Stål, 1866^{c g}
- Popplepsalta Owen & Moulds, 2016^{c g}
- Poviliana Boulard, 1997^{c g}
- Prasia Stål, 1863^{c g}
- Prasinosoma Torres, 1963^{i c g}
- Proarna Stål, 1864^{i c g}
- Procollina Metcalf, 1952^{i c g}
- Prosotettix Jacobi, 1907^{i c g}
- Prunasis Stål, 1862^{i c g}
- Psallodia Uhler, 1903^{i c g}
- Psalmocharias Kirkaldy, 1908^{c g}
- Psaltoda Stål, 1862^{c g}
- Psephenotettix Torres, 1958^{i c g}
- Pseudokanakia Delorme, 2016^{c g}
- Pseudotettigetta Puissant, 2010^{c g}
- Psilotympana Stål, 1862^{c g}
- Psithyristria Stål, 1870^{c g}
- Punia Moulds, 2012^{c g}
- Purana Distant, 1905^{c g}
- Puranoides Moulton, 1917^{c g}
- Pycna Amyot & Audinet-Serville, 1843^{c g}
- Pyropsalta Moulds, 2012^{c g}
- Quesada Distant, 1905^{i c g b}
- Quintilia Stål, 1866^{c g}
- Qurana Lee, 2009^{c g}
- Raiateana Boulard, 1979^{c g}
- Relictapsalta Owen & Moulds, 2016^{c g}
- Rhadinopyga Duffels, 1985^{c g}
- Rhinopsalta Melichar, 1908^{c g}
- Rhodopsalta Dugdale, 1971^{c g}
- Rouxalna Boulard, 1999^{c g}
- Rustia Stål, 1866^{c g}
- Sadaka Distant, 1904^{c g}
- Salvazana Distant, 1913^{c g}
- Samaecicada Popple & Emery, 2010^{c g}
- Sapantanga Distant, 1905^{c g}
- Saticula Stål, 1866^{c g}
- Scieroptera Stål, 1866^{c g}
- Scolopita Chou & Lei, 1997^{c g}
- Scottotympana de Boer, 1991^{c g}
- Sechellalna Boulard, 2010^{c g}
- Selymbria Stål, 1861^{i c g}
- Semia Matsumura, 1917^{c g}
- Severiana Boulard, 1973^{c g}
- Shaoshia Wei, Ahmed & Rizvi, 2010^{c g}
- Simona Moulds, 2012^{c g}
- Sinapsaltria Kato, 1940^{c g}
- Sinosemia Matsumura, 1927^{c g}
- Sinotympana Lee, 2009^{c g}
- Songga Lee, 2016^{c g}
- Soudaniella Boulard, 1973^{c g}
- Spoerryana Boulard, 1974^{c g}
- Stagea Villet, 1995^{c g}
- Stagira Stål, 1861^{c g}
- Stellenboschia Distant, 1920^{c g}
- Strepuntalna Delorme, 2017^{c g}
- Strumosella Boulard, 1973^{c g}
- Strumoseura Villet, 1999^{c g}
- Subpsaltria Chen, 1943^{c g}
- Subtibicina Lee, 2012^{c g}
- Suisha Kato, 1928^{c g}
- Sulphogaeana Chou & Yao, 1985^{c g}
- Sundabroma Duffels, 2011^{c g}
- Sylphoides Moulds, 2012^{c g}
- Tacua Amyot & Serville, 1843^{c g}
- Taipinga Distant, 1905^{c g}
- Taiwanosemia Matsumura, 1917^{c g}
- Takapsalta Matsumura, 1927^{c g}
- Talainga Distant, 1890^{c g}
- Talcopsaltria Moulds, 2008^{c g}
- Tamasa Distant, 1905^{c g}
- Tanna Distant, 1905^{c g}
- Taona Distant, 1909^{c g}
- Taphura Stål, 1862^{i c g}
- Taungia Ollenbach, 1928^{c g}
- Taurella Moulds, 2012^{c g}
- Telmapsalta Moulds, 2012^{c g}
- Terepsalta Moulds, 2012^{c g}
- Terpnosia Distant, 1892^{c g}
- Tettigades Amyot and Audinet-Serville, 1843^{i c g}
- Tettigetta Kolenati, 1857^{c g}
- Tettigettacula Puissant, 2010^{c g}
- Tettigettalna Puissant, 2010^{c g}
- Tettigettula Puissant, 2010^{c g}
- Tettigomyia Amyot & Audinet-Serville, 1843^{c g}
- Tettigotoma Torres, 1942^{i c g}
- Thaumastopsaltria Kirkaldy, 1900^{c g}
- Thopha Amyot & Audinet-Serville, 1843^{c g}
- Tibeta Lei & Chou, 1997^{c g}
- Tibicina Kolenati, 1857^{i c g}
- Tibicinoides Distant, 1914^{i c g}
- Torrescada Sanborn & Heath, 2017^{c g}
- Tosena Amyot & Audinet-Serville, 1843^{c g}
- Toulgoetalna Boulard, 1982^{i c g}
- Toxala Moulds, 2012^{c g}
- Toxopeusella Schmidt, 1926^{c g}
- Trengganua Moulton, 1923^{c g}
- Triglena Fieber, 1875^{c g}
- Trismarcha Karsch, 1891^{c g}
- Tryella Moulds, 2003^{c g}
- Tugelana Distant, 1912^{c g}
- Tympanistalna Boulard, 1982^{c g}
- Tympanoterpes Stål, 1861^{i c g}
- Ueana Distant, 1905^{c g}
- Ugada Distant, 1904^{c g}
- Uhleroides Distant, 1912^{i c g}
- Umjaba Distant, 1904^{c g}
- Unduncus Duffels, 2011^{c g}
- Unipomponia Lee, 2014^{c g}
- Urabunana Distant, 1905^{c g}
- Uradolichos Moulds, 2012^{c g}
- Vagitanus Distant, 1918^{c g}
- Vastarena Delorme, 2016^{c g}
- Venustria Goding & Froggatt, 1904^{c g}
- Viettealna Boulard, 1980^{c g}
- Xosopsaltria Kirkaldy, 1904^{c g}
- Xossarella Boulard, 1980^{c g}
- Yanga Distant, 1904^{c g}
- Yezoterpnosia Matsumura, 1917^{c g}
- Yoyetta Moulds, 2012^{c g}
- Zammara Amyot and Audinet-Serville, 1843^{i c g}
- Zammaralna Boulard and Sueur, 1996^{i c g}
- Zaphsa Lee & Emery, 2014^{c g}
- Zouga Distant, 1906^{c g}
- † Burmacicada Poinar & Kritsky, 2012^{c g}
- † Camuracicada Moulds, 2018
- † Dominicicada Poinar & Kritsky, 2012^{c g}
- † Fonsecacicada Martins-Neto & Mendes, 2002^{c g}
- † Jassus Fabricius, 1803^{c g}
- † Lithocicada Cockerell, 1906^{c g}
- † Minyscapheus Poinar, Kritsky & Brown, 2012^{c g}
- † Miocenoprasia Boulard & Riou, 1999^{c g}
- † Paleopsalta Moulds, 2018
- † Paracicadetta Boulard & Nel, 1990^{c g}
- † Tymocicada Becker-Migdisova, 1954^{c g}

Data sources: i = ITIS, c = Catalogue of Life, g = GBIF, b = Bugguide.net
