= List of Cicadinae genera =

These 193 genera belong to Cicadinae, a subfamily of cicadas in the family Cicadidae. There are at least 1,600 described species in Cicadinae.

== Cicadinae genera ==
- Aceropyga Duffels, 1977^{c g}
- Aetanna Lee, 2014^{c g}
- Afzeliada Boulard, 1973^{c g}
- Albanycada Villet, 1989^{c g}
- Ambragaeana Chou & Yao, 1985^{c g}
- Anapsaltoda Ashton, 1921^{c g}
- Antankaria Distant, 1904^{c g}
- Aola Distant, 1905
- Arenopsaltria Ashton, 1921^{c g}
- Ariasa Distant, 1905^{i c g}
- Arunta Distant, 1904^{c g}
- Attenuella Boulard, 1973^{c g}
- Auritibicen Lee, 2015^{c g}
- Ayesha Distant, 1905^{c g}
- Ayuthia Distant, 1919^{c g}
- Azanicada Villet, 1989^{c g}
- Balinta Distant, 1905^{c g}
- Basa Distant, 1905^{c g}
- Beameria Davis, 1934^{i c g b}
- Becquartina Kato, 1940^{c g}
- Bergalna Boulard & Martinelli, 1996^{i c g}
- Biura Lee & Sanborn, 2015^{c g}
- Borencona Davis, 1928^{i c g}
- Brachylobopyga Duffels, 1982^{c g}
- Brevisiana Boulard, 1973^{c g}
- Burbunga Distant, 1905^{c g}
- Cabecita Lee, 2014^{c g}
- Cacama Distant, 1904^{i c g b} (cactus dodgers)
- Calcagninus Distant, 1892^{c g}
- Callogaeana Chou & Yao, 1985^{c g}
- Canualna Boulard, 1985^{c g}
- Capcicada Villet, 1989^{c g}
- Champaka Distant, 1905^{c g}
- Changa Lee, 2016^{c g}
- Chinaria Davis, 1934^{i c g}
- Chremistica Stål, 1870^{c g}
- Cicada Linnaeus, 1758^{i g}
- Cicadmalleus Boulard & Puissant, 2013^{c g}
- Cochleopsaltria Pham & Constant, 2017
- Cornuplura Davis, 1944^{i c g b}
- Cosmopsaltria Stål, 1866^{c g}
- Cracenpsaltria Sanborn, 2016^{c g}
- Crassopsaltria Boulard, 2008^{c g}
- Cryptotympana Stål, 1861^{c g}
- Cyclochila Amyot & Audinet-Serville, 1843^{c g}
- Daza Distant, 1905^{i c g}
- Diceroprocta Stål, 1870^{i c g b} (scrub cicadas)
- Diceropyga Stål, 1870^{c g}
- Dilobopyga Duffels, 1977^{c g}
- Distantada Orian, 1963^{c g}
- Distantalna Boulard, 2009^{c g}
- Dorisiana Metcalf, 1952^{i c g}
- Dundubia Amyot & Audinet-Serville, 1843^{c g}
- Durangona Distant, 1911^{i c g}
- Elassoneura Torres, 1964^{i c g}
- Esada Boulard, 1973^{c g}
- Euterpnosia Matsumura, 1917^{c g}
- Fidicina Amyot & Audinet-Serville, 1843^{i c g}
- Fidicinoides Boulard & Martinelli, 1996^{i c g}
- Formocicada Lee & Hayashi, 2004^{c g}
- Formosemia Matsumura, 1917^{c g}
- Gaeana Amyot & Audinet-Serville, 1843^{c g}
- Galgoria Lee, 2016^{c g}
- Gudaba Distant, 1906^{c g}
- Guyalna Boulard & Martinelli, 1996^{i c g}
- Hadoa Moulds, 2015^{c g b} (western annual cicadas)
- Hainanosemia Kato, 1927^{c g}
- Hamza Distant, 1904^{c g}
- Haphsa Distant, 1905^{c g}
- Hea Distant, 1906^{c g}
- Hemisciera Amyot & Audinet-Serville, 1843^{i c g}
- Henicopsaltria Stål, 1866^{c g}
- Heteropsaltria Jacobi, 1902^{c g}
- Hyantia Stål, 1866^{i c g}
- Illyria Moulds, 1985^{c g}
- Inflatopyga Duffels, 1997^{c g}
- Inthaxara Distant, 1913^{c g}
- Ioba Distant, 1904^{c g}
- Jassopsaltria Ashton, 1914^{c g}
- Juanaria Distant, 1920^{i c g}
- Kalabita Moulton, 1923^{c g}
- Kamalata Distant, 1889^{c g}
- Kaphsa Lee, 2012^{c g}
- Karenia Distant, 1888^{c g}
- Karscheliana Boulard, 1990^{c g}
- Khimbya Distant, 1905^{c g}
- Koma Distant, 1904^{c g}
- Kongota Distant, 1904^{c g}
- Lahugada Distant, 1905^{c g}
- Leptopsaltria Stål, 1866^{c g}
- Leptosemia Matsumura, 1917^{c g}
- Lethama Distant, 1905^{c g}
- Macrosemia Kato, 1925^{c g}
- Macrotristria Stål, 1870^{c g}
- Majeorona Distant, 1905^{i c g}
- Manna Lee & Emery, 2013^{c g}
- Masamia Lee & Emery, 2013^{c g}
- Mata Distant, 1906^{c g}
- Maua Distant, 1905^{c g}
- Megapomponia Boulard, 2005^{c g}
- Megatibicen ^{c g b}
- Meimuna Distant, 1905^{c g}
- Minilomia Lee, 2013^{c g}
- Minipomponia Boulard, 2008^{c g}
- Miniterpnosia Lee, 2013^{c g}
- Miranha Distant, 1905^{i c g}
- Moana Myers, 1928^{c g}
- Mosaica Lee & Emery, 2013^{c g}
- Muansa Distant, 1904^{c g}
- Munza Distant, 1904^{c g}
- Mura Distant, 1905^{i c g}
- Nabalua Moulton, 1923^{c g}
- Neocicada Kato, 1932^{i c g}
- Neoncotympana Lee, 2010^{c g}
- Neopsaltoda Distant, 1910^{c g}
- Neoterpnosia Lee & Emery, 2014^{c g}
- Neotibicen Hill & Moulds, 2015^{c g b} (annual or dogday cicadas)
- Nggeliana Boulard, 1979^{c g}
- Nosola Stål, 1866^{i c g}
- Odopoea Stål, 1861^{i c g}
- Ollanta Distant, 1905^{i c g}
- Oncotympana Stål, 1870^{c g}
- Onomacritus Distant, 1912^{c g}
- Onoralna Boulard, 1996^{i c g}
- Orapa Distant, 1905^{c g}
- Orellana Distant, 1905^{i c g}
- Orialella Metcalf, 1952^{i c g}
- Orientopsaltria Kato, 1944^{c g}
- Oxypleura Amyot & Audinet-Serville, 1843^{c g}
- Pacarina Distant, 1905^{i c g b}
- Pachypsaltria Stål, 1863^{i c g}
- Paranosia Lee, 2014^{c g}
- Paratalainga He, 1984^{c g}
- Paratanna Lee, 2012^{c g}
- Parnquila Moulds, 2012^{c g}
- Platylomia Stål, 1870^{c g}
- Platypleura Amyot & Audinet-Serville, 1843^{c g}
- Plautilla Stål, 1865^{i c g}
- Pompanonia Boulard, 1982^{i c g}
- Pomponia Stål, 1866^{c g}
- Prasinosoma Torres, 1963^{i c g}
- Proarna Stål, 1864^{i c g}
- Procollina Metcalf, 1952^{i c g}
- Psaltoda Stål, 1861^{c g}
- Psithyristria Stål, 1870^{c g}
- Purana Distant, 1905^{c g}
- Puranoides Moulton, 1917^{c g}
- Pycna Amyot & Audinet-Serville, 1843^{c g}
- Quesada Distant, 1905^{i c g b}
- Qurana Lee, 2009^{c g}
- Raiateana Boulard, 1979^{c g}
- Rhadinopyga Duffels, 1985^{c g}
- Rustia Stål, 1866^{c g}
- Sadaka Distant, 1904^{c g}
- Salvazana Distant, 1913^{c g}
- Sechellalna Boulard, 2010^{c g}
- Semia Matsumura, 1917^{c g}
- Severiana Boulard, 1973^{c g}
- Sinapsaltria Kato, 1940^{c g}
- Sinosemia Matsumura, 1927^{c g}
- Sinotympana Lee, 2009^{c g}
- Songga Lee, 2016^{c g}
- Soudaniella Boulard, 1973^{c g}
- Strumosella Boulard, 1973^{c g}
- Strumoseura Villet, 1999^{c g}
- Suisha Kato, 1928^{c g}
- Sulphogaeana Chou & Yao, 1985^{c g}
- Tacua Amyot & Audinet-Serville, 1843^{c g}
- Taiwanosemia Matsumura, 1917^{c g}
- Talainga Distant, 1890^{c g}
- Tamasa Distant, 1905^{c g}
- Tanna Distant, 1905^{c g}
- Taona Distant, 1909^{c g}
- Terpnosia Distant, 1892^{c g}
- Thopha Amyot & Audinet-Serville, 1843^{c g}
- Tibicen Latreille, 1825
- Tosena Amyot & Audinet-Serville, 1843^{c g}
- Trengganua Moulton, 1923^{c g}
- Tugelana Distant, 1912^{c g}
- Tympanoterpes Stål, 1861^{i c g}
- Ugada Distant, 1904^{c g}
- Uhleroides Distant, 1912^{i c g}
- Umjaba Distant, 1904^{c g}
- Unipomponia Lee, 2014^{c g}
- Yanga Distant, 1904^{c g}
- Yezoterpnosia Matsumura, 1917^{c g}
- Zammara Amyot & Audinet-Serville, 1843^{i c g}
- Zammaralna Boulard & Sueur, 1996^{i c g}
- Zaphsa Lee & Emery, 2014^{c g}
- † Camuracicada Moulds, 2018
- † Tymocicada Becker-Migdisova, 1954

Data sources: i = ITIS, c = Catalogue of Life, g = GBIF, b = Bugguide.net
