= Metapurana nebulilinea =

Scientific classification
- Domain: Eukaryota
- Kingdom: Animalia
- Phylum: Arthropoda
- Class: Insecta
- Order: Hemiptera
- Suborder: Auchenorrhyncha
- Family: Cicadidae
- Subfamily: Cicadinae
- Tribe: Leptopsaltriini
- Subtribe: Puranina
- Genus: Metapurana
- Species: M. nebulilinea

Binomial name
- Metapurana nebulilinea (Walker, 1868)

Synonyms
- Purana nebulilinea (Duffels, Schouten & Lammertink, 2007); Dundubia nebulilinea Walker, 1868; Leptopsaltria nebulinea [sic] (Walker, 1868)

Species of cicadas

Metapurana nebulilinea is the type species of its new genus of cicadas (it was previously placed in Purana); it is distributed in peninsular Malaysia, Sumatra, Borneo and nearby smaller islands. Its song consists of a long sequence (around 1 minute) of high pitched sounds with a characteristic frequency modulation pattern which can be repeated many times without interruption.
