= Rustia =

Rustia may refer to:

- Rustia (plant), a plant genus in the family Rubiaceae
- Rustia (cicada), a genus of cicadas
