= Vietanna =

Scientific classification
- Domain: Eukaryota
- Kingdom: Animalia
- Phylum: Arthropoda
- Class: Insecta
- Order: Hemiptera
- Suborder: Auchenorrhyncha
- Family: Cicadidae
- Tribe: Leptopsaltriini
- Subtribe: Leptopsaltriina
- Genus: Vietanna; Lee & Pham, 2021

Synonyms
- Duffelsa Wang, Jiang & Wei, 2023

Genus of cicadas

External image
- Images at iNaturalist

Vietanna is a genus of Asian cicadas in the tribe Leptopsaltriini (subtribe Leptopsaltriina), erected by Young June Lee and Hong Thai Pham in 2021; they named it after Vietnam and the similar genus Tanna. Species have been recorded from China and Indochina.

== Species ==
The World Auchenorrhyncha Database includes:

1. Vietanna grandia (Wang, Jiang & Wei, 2023)
2. Vietanna hanoiensis Pham & Lee, 2021 - type species
3. Vietanna longiloba Wang, Feng, Jiang & Wei, 2024
4. Vietanna orientalis (Distant, 1912)
5. Vietanna parvula (Wang, Jiang & Wei, 2023)
6. Vietanna perparva Wang, Feng, Jiang & Wei, 2024
7. Vietanna rubida (Wang, Jiang & Wei, 2023)
