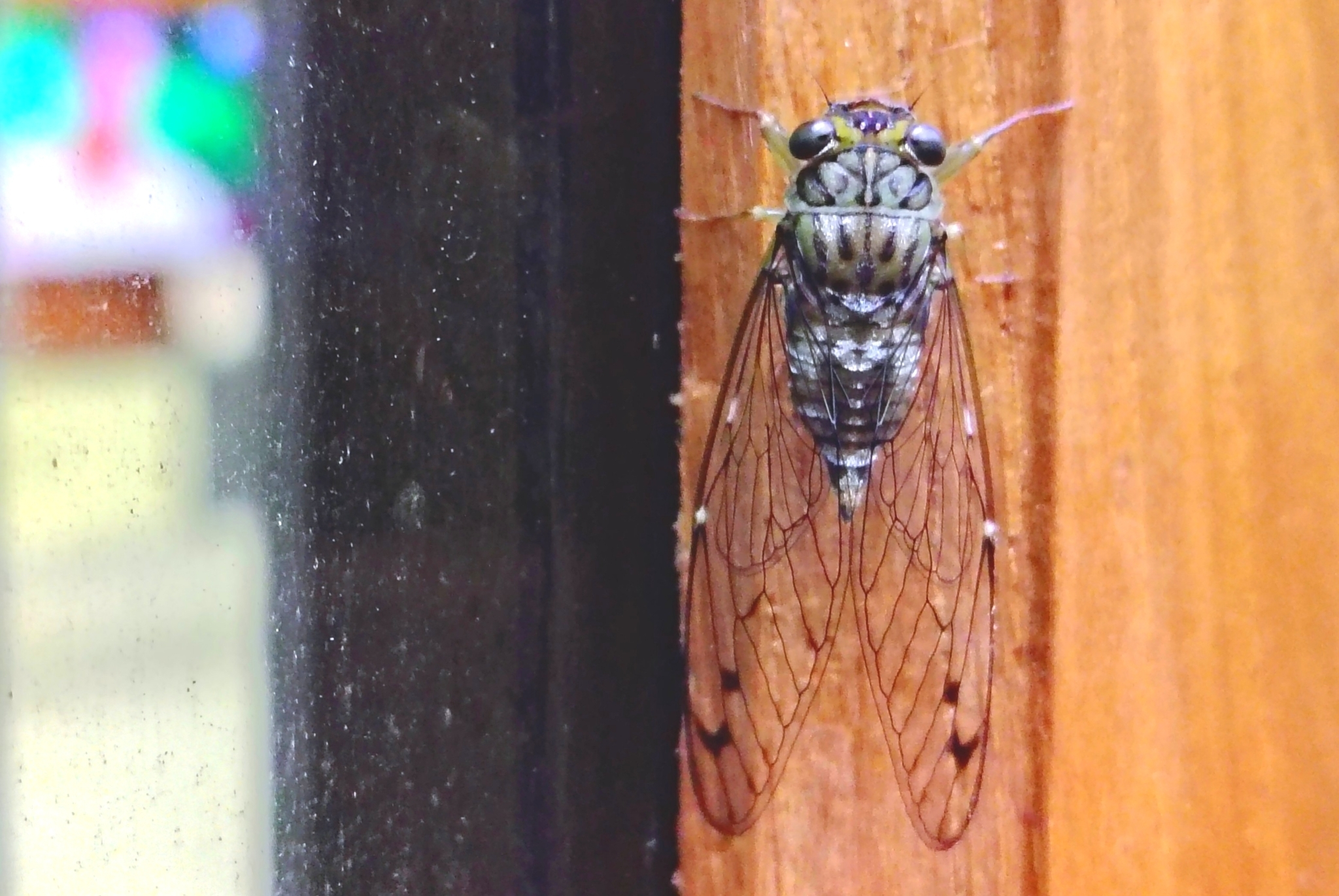
- Indopurana morrisi

Scientific classification
- Domain: Eukaryota
- Kingdom: Animalia
- Phylum: Arthropoda
- Class: Insecta
- Order: Hemiptera
- Suborder: Auchenorrhyncha
- Family: Cicadidae
- Tribe: Leptopsaltriini
- Subtribe: Puranina
- Genus: Indopurana; Lee, 2024

= Indopurana =

Genus of cicadas

Indopurana is a genus of Asian cicadas in the tribe Leptopsaltriini (subtribe Puranina), erected by Young June Lee in 2024. This formed part of his review of the genus Purana and the prefix is named after India, where they are found; to date, species have only been recorded from the South-West of the country.

== Species ==
The World Auchenorrhyncha Database includes:

1. Indopurana cheeveeda (Sadasivan, 2023)
2. Indopurana morrisi (Distant, 1892) - type species (as Leptopsaltria morrisi Distant, 1892)
