= Philipurana =

Scientific classification
- Domain: Eukaryota
- Kingdom: Animalia
- Phylum: Arthropoda
- Class: Insecta
- Order: Hemiptera
- Suborder: Auchenorrhyncha
- Family: Cicadidae
- Tribe: Leptopsaltriini
- Subtribe: Puranina
- Genus: Philipurana; Lee, 2024

Genus of cicadas

External image
- Images at iNaturalist

Philipurana is a genus of Asian cicadas in the tribe Leptopsaltriini (subtribe Puranina), erected by Young June Lee in 2024. This formed part of his review of the genus Purana and the prefix is named after the Philippines; to date, species have only been recorded from there.

== Species ==
The World Auchenorrhyncha Database includes:

1. Philipurana abdominalis (Lee, 2009) - type species (previously Purana abdominalis Lee, 2009)
2. Philipurana crassinotata (Lee, 2015)
3. Philipurana nana (Lee, 2009)
