= Purapurana =

Scientific classification
- Domain: Eukaryota
- Kingdom: Animalia
- Phylum: Arthropoda
- Class: Insecta
- Order: Hemiptera
- Suborder: Auchenorrhyncha
- Family: Cicadidae
- Tribe: Leptopsaltriini
- Subtribe: Puranina
- Genus: Purapurana; Lee, 2024

Genus of cicadas

External image
- Images at iNaturalist

Purapurana is a genus of Asian cicadas in the tribe Leptopsaltriini (subtribe Puranina), erected by Young June Lee in 2024. This formed part of his review of the genus Purana and the prefix was simply the Latin adjective pura meaning pure. Species have been recorded from China, Indochina and Malesia.

== Species ==
The World Auchenorrhyncha Database includes:

1. Purapurana atroclunes (Boulard, 2002)
2. Purapurana barbosae (Distant, 1889)
3. Purapurana carmente (Walker, 1850) - type species (as Dundubia carmente Walker, 1850)
4. Purapurana chueatae (Boulard, 2007)
5. Purapurana dimidia (Chou & Lei, 1997)
6. Purapurana hermes (Schouten & Duffels, 2002)
7. Purapurana infuscata (Schouten & Duffels, 2002)
8. Purapurana khuanae (Boulard, 2002)
9. Purapurana mickhuanae (Boulard, 2009)
10. Purapurana mindanaoensis (Lee & Marshall, 2023)
11. Purapurana natae (Boulard, 2007)
12. Purapurana obducta (Schouten & Duffels, 2002)
13. Purapurana opaca (Lee, 2009)
14. Purapurana phetchabuna (Boulard, 2008)
15. Purapurana sagittata (Schouten & Duffels, 2002)
16. Purapurana tanae (Boulard, 2007)
17. Purapurana trui (Pham, Schouten & Yang, 2012)
18. Purapurana vindevogheli (Boulard, 2008)
