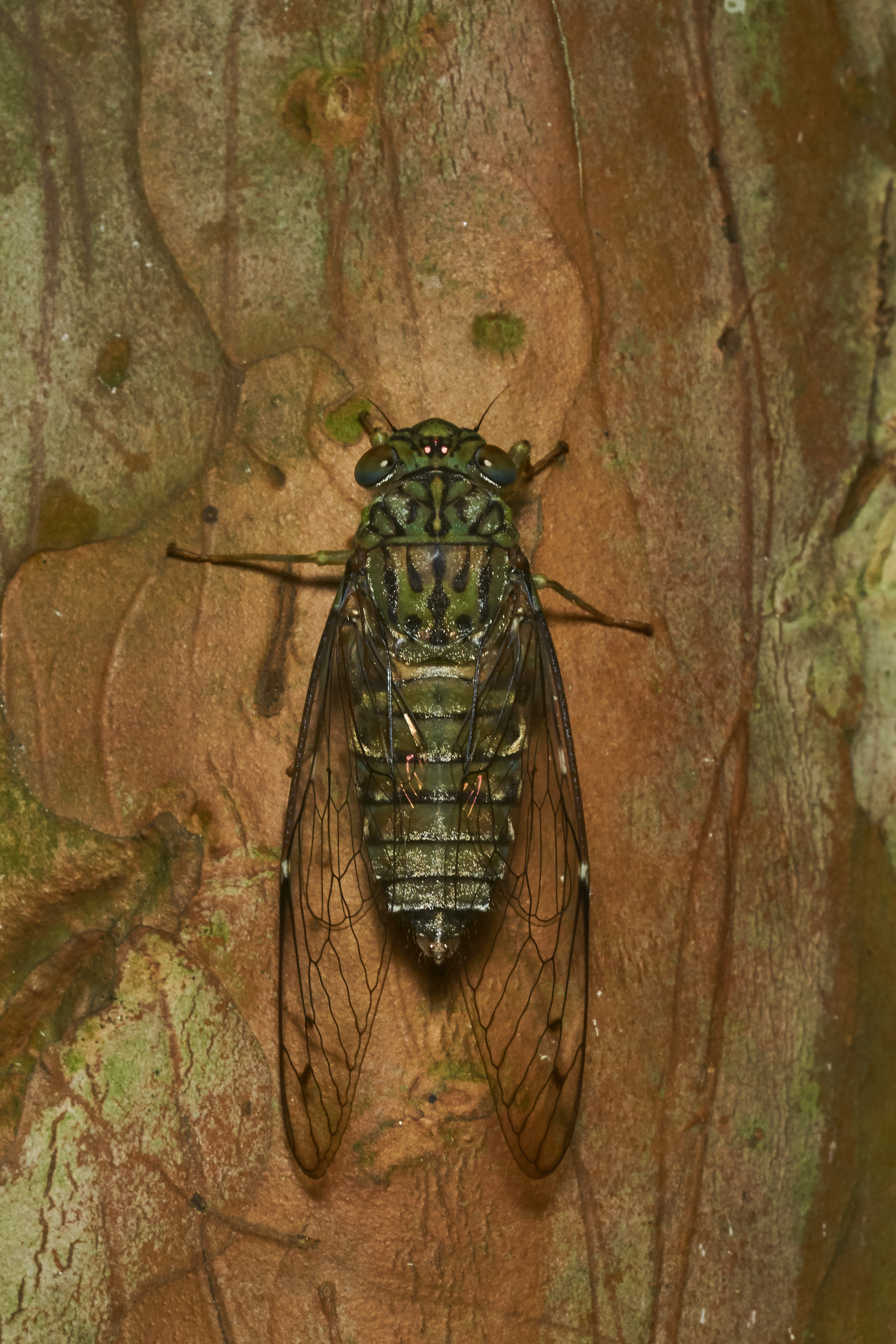
- Male (dorsal view)

Scientific classification
- Kingdom: Animalia
- Phylum: Arthropoda
- Clade: Pancrustacea
- Class: Insecta
- Order: Hemiptera
- Suborder: Auchenorrhyncha
- Family: Cicadidae
- Genus: Purana
- Species: P. tigrina

Binomial name
- Purana tigrina (Walker, 1850)

Synonyms
- Dundubia tigrina Walker, 1850

Audio
- Tentative P. tigrina sound recording

= Purana tigrina =

Species of cicada found in Southeast Asia

Purana tigrina is the type species of cicadas in its genus and is found in Southeast Asia. It was described from Malabar, South India. It is a common species in the Malayan Peninsula and on Bunguran Island in the South China Sea.

The body length of a male is 22.5–29 mm and that of the female somewhat less at 18–23 mm. They have a greenish-ochraceous head and thorax, and brownish-ochraceous abdomen. The head and thorax are marked in black.

== Description ==
Purana tigrina is a large insect with the wings extending well beyond the tip of the abdomen. Adult males are 22.5 to 29 mm (0.9 to 1.1 in) in length while females range from 18 to 23 mm (0.7 to 0.9 in). The general colour is pale to dark brown tinged with green, and marked with black. The head has a prominent pair of compound eyes on the side, and between these are a pair of short antennae set on conical bases. There are three small ocelli in a triangular shape located on the top of the head. The long, sharp mouthparts, known as the rostrum, are inserted into the trunks of trees to suck sap from the xylem. The thorax has three segments, each with a pair of legs, and bears two pairs of membranous wings, folded tent-like above the body when at rest; the wing venation is characteristic of the species. The abdomen is segmented and contains the reproductive organs. In females it is tipped by a large, saw-edged ovipositor, while in males, it encloses the tymbal organ which is used in the production of the song.

== Distribution and habitat ==
Purana tigrina was first described in 1850 from the Malabar Coast of southwestern India by the English entomologist Francis Walker. It is common in the Malay Peninsula and Bunguran Island, and less common in southern Borneo, Sumatra and Nias Island. It occurs in primary lowland rainforest but is more often found in secondary forest, felled areas, parks and gardens.

== Gallery ==
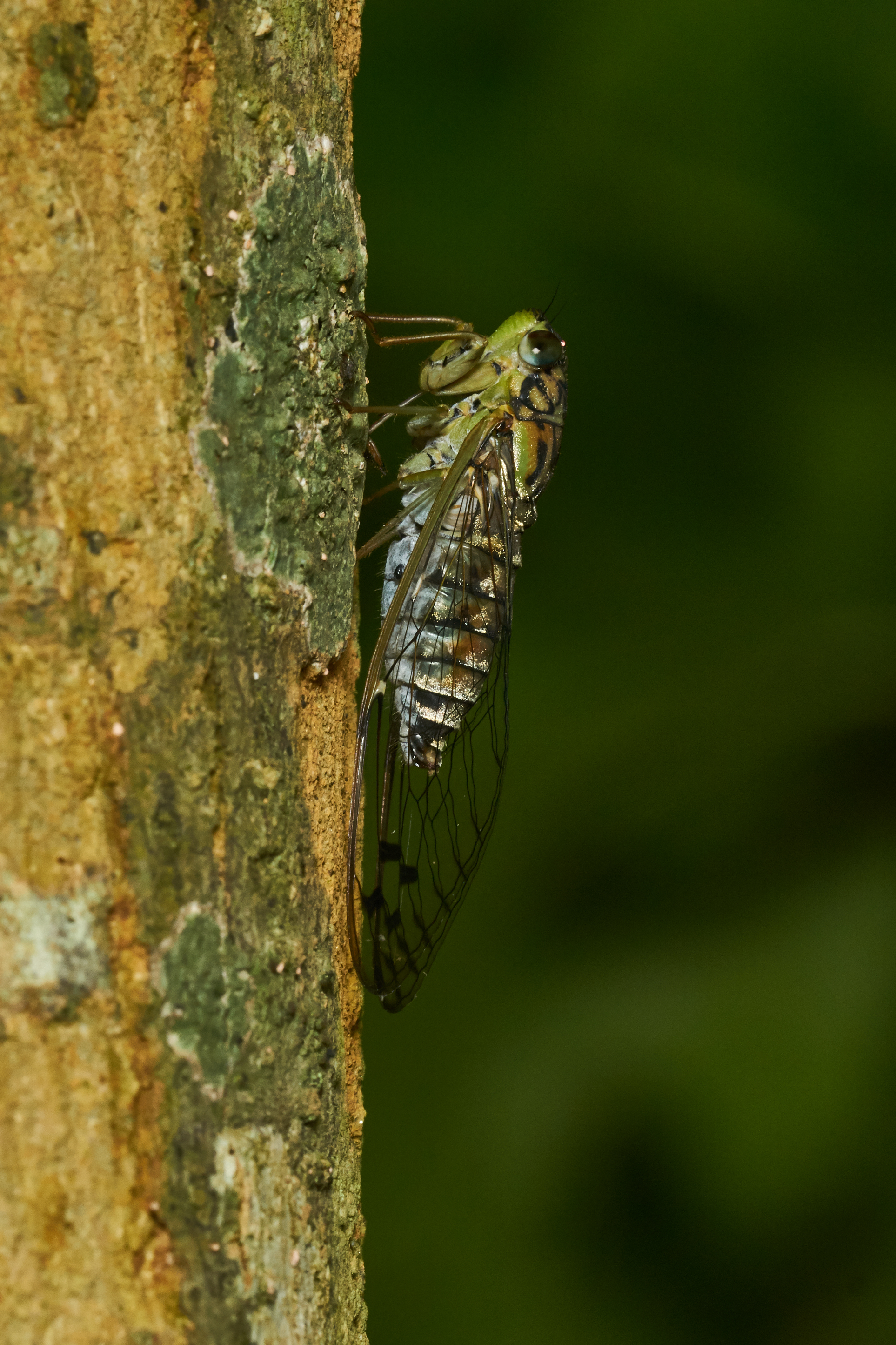
Male (lateral view)

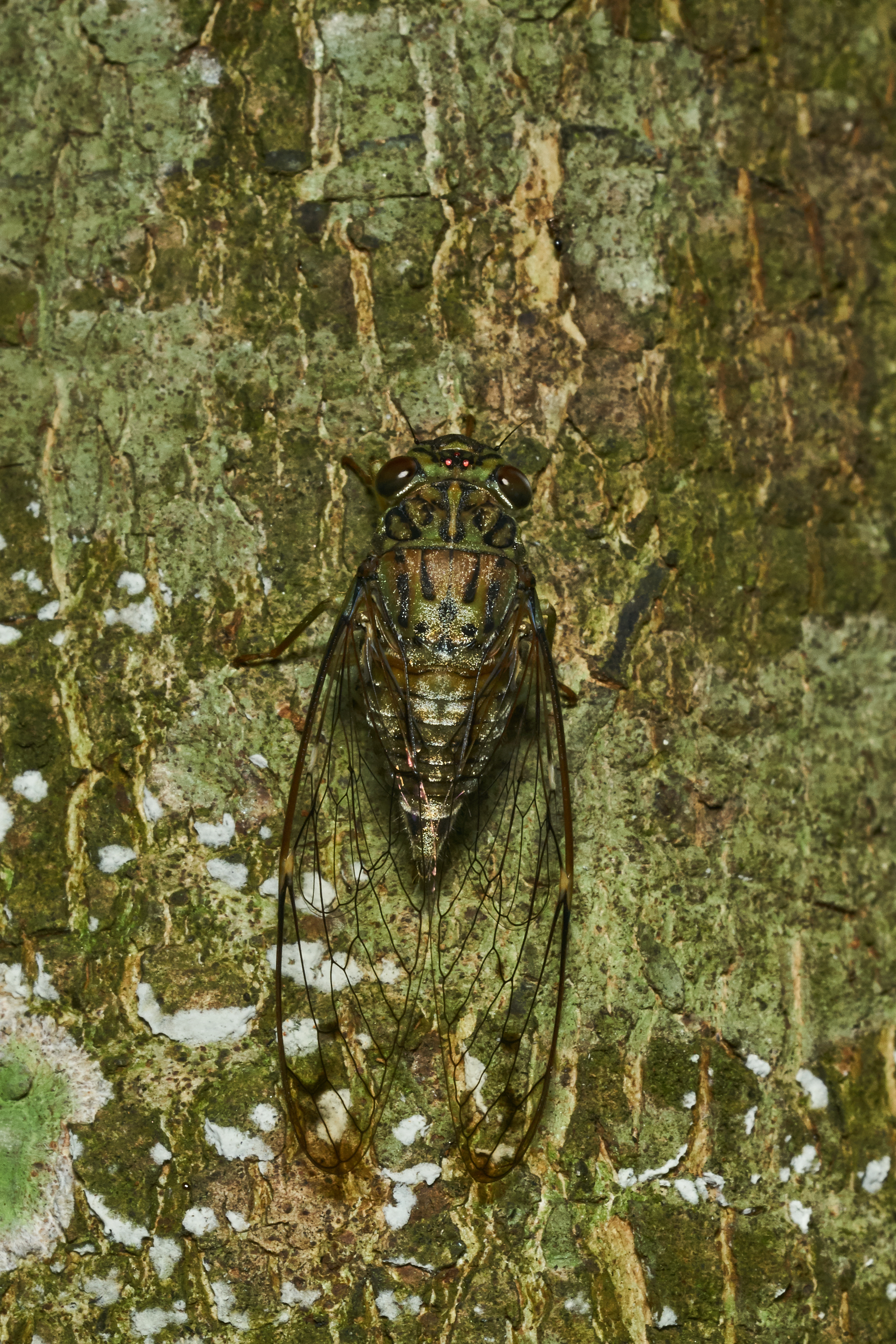
Female (dorsal view)

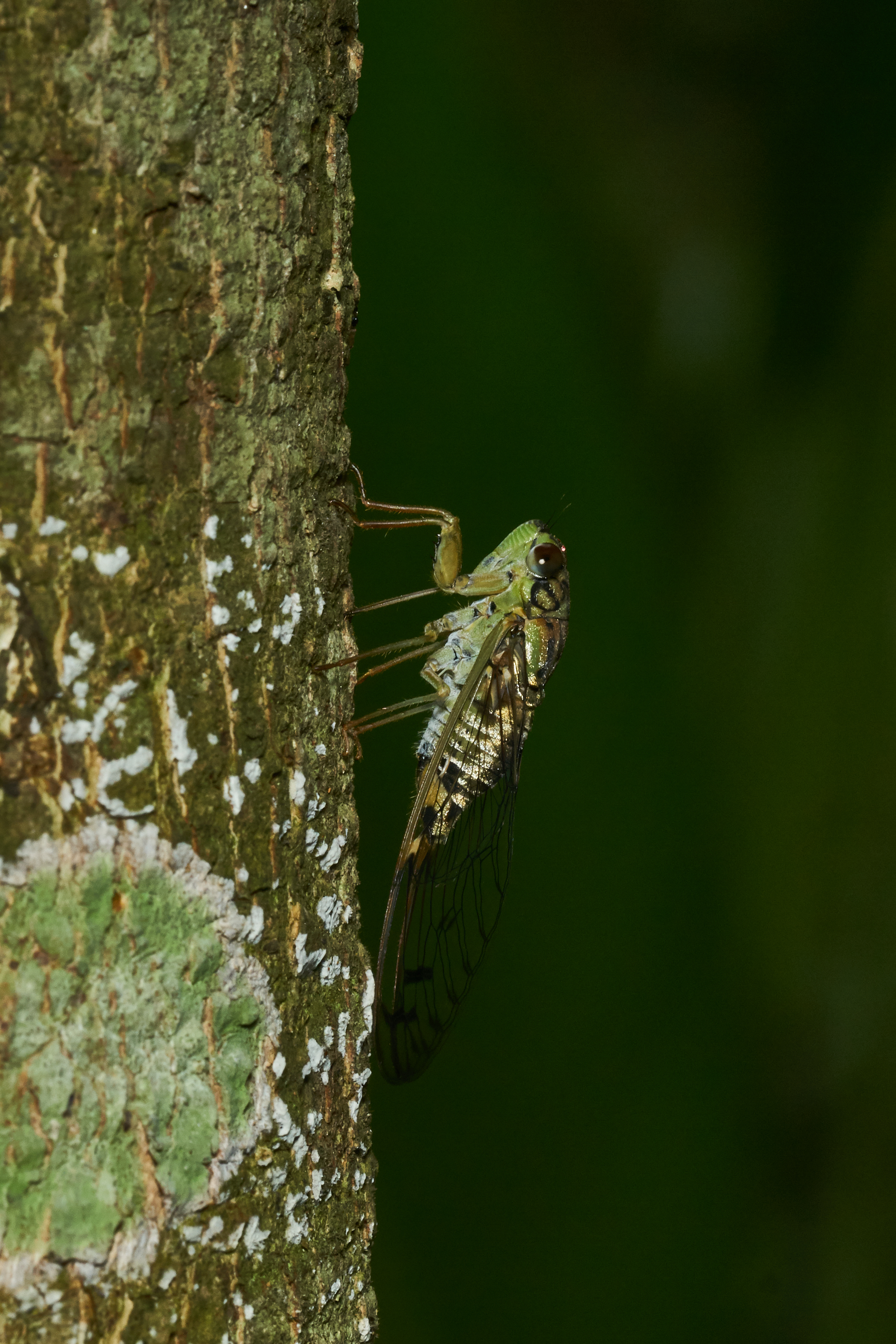
Female (lateral view)

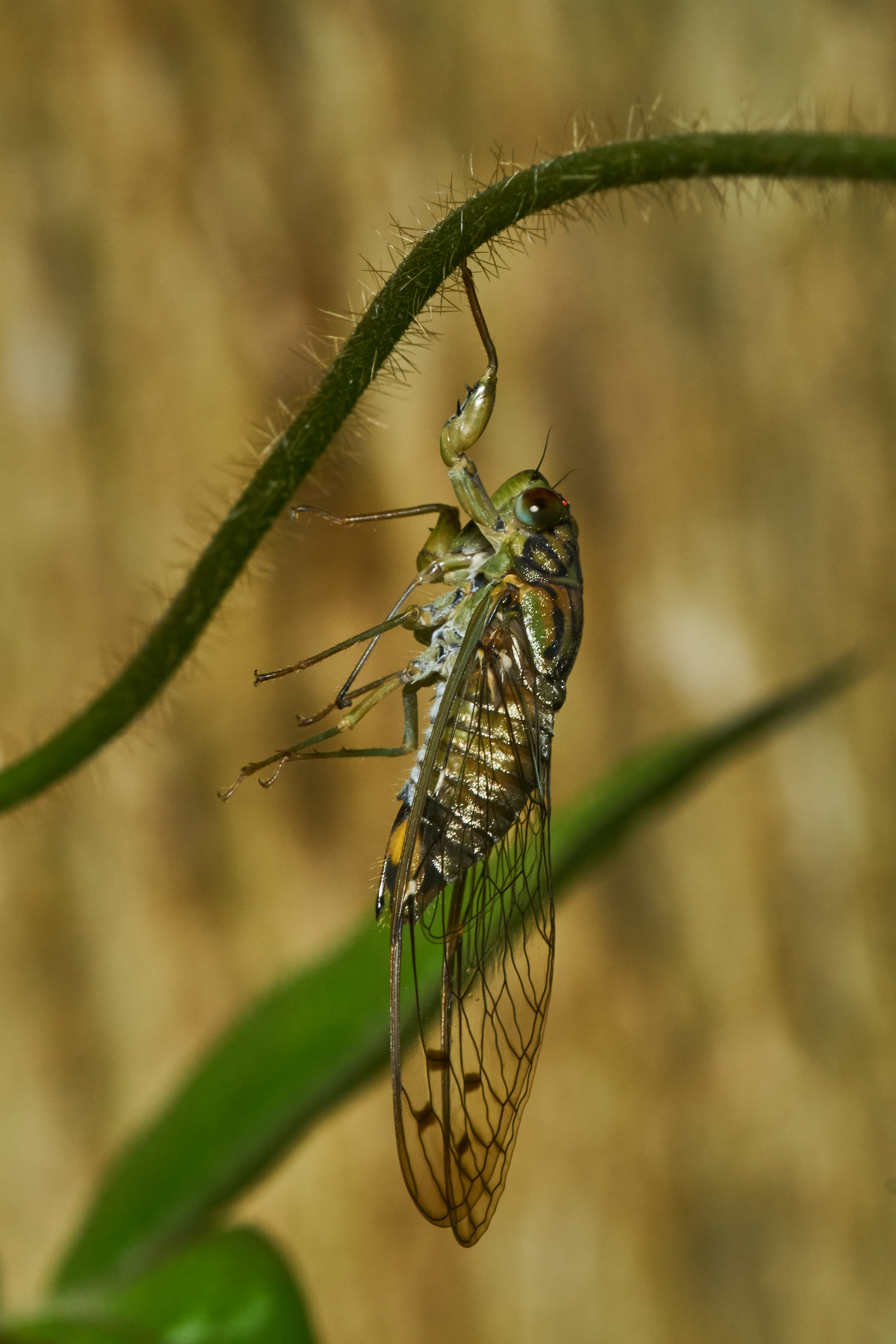
Newly eclosed female drying wings in vertical suspension
