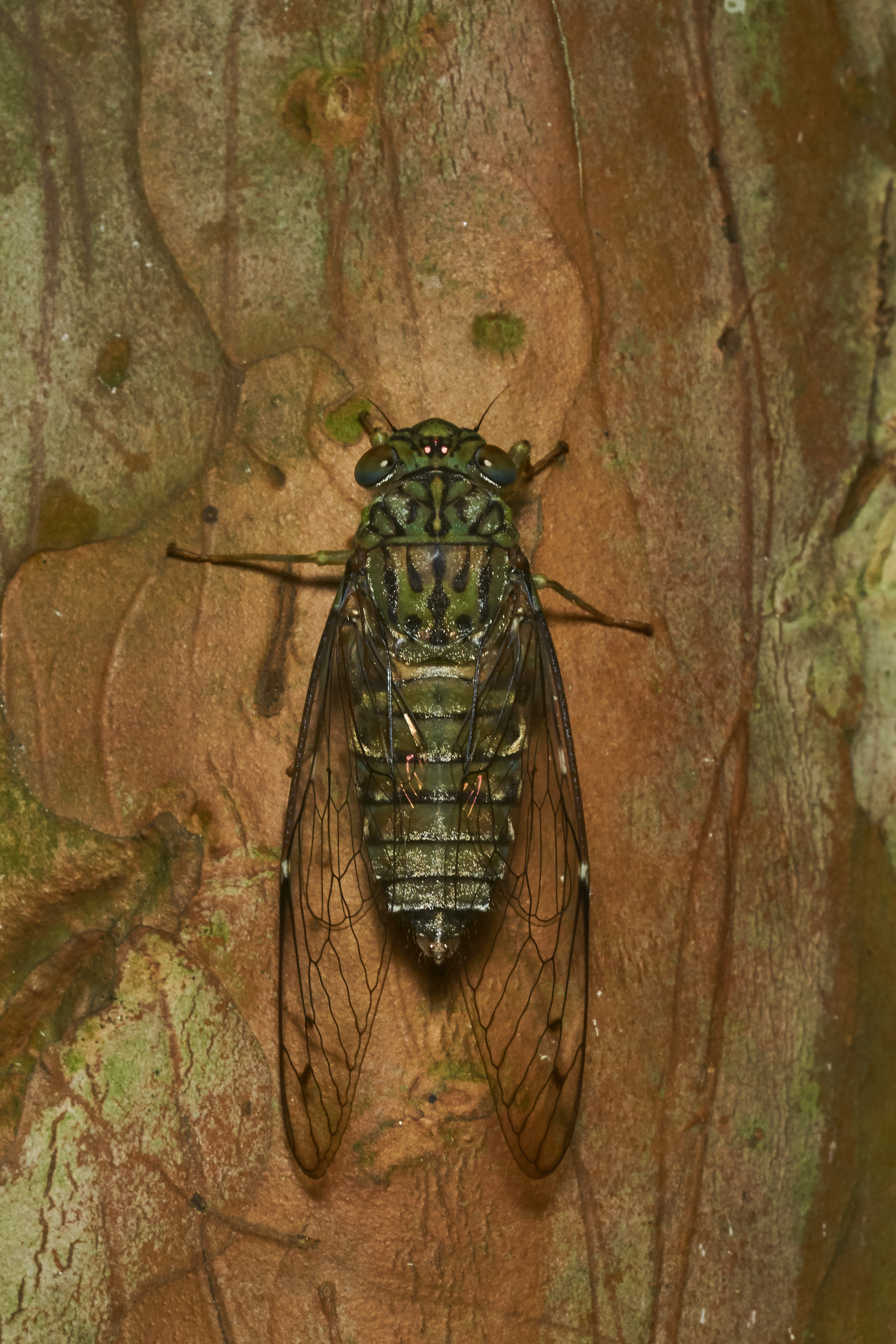
- Purana tigrina, Kerala

Scientific classification
- Domain: Eukaryota
- Kingdom: Animalia
- Phylum: Arthropoda
- Class: Insecta
- Order: Hemiptera
- Suborder: Auchenorrhyncha
- Family: Cicadidae
- Subtribe: Puranina
- Genus: Purana; Distant, 1905

Species
- See text

= Purana (cicada) =

Genus of true bugs

Purana is a genus of cicadas from Southeast Asia. Its distribution includes Java, Sumatra, Borneo, the Philippines, peninsular Malaysia, Thailand, India, Indochina, China, and Japan.

== Description ==
In all species the male possess two pairs of dark ventral abdominal tubercles on third and fourth sternites. The male opercula are rather short and generally do not reach beyond the posterior pair of tubercles. Related genera of the tribe Leptopsaltriini that also possess abdominal tubercles are Maua (in the same subtribe) and Leptopsaltria, Nabalua and Tanna which are in the subtribe Leptopsaltriina.

== Species ==
After various reviews, only the following Purana species are accepted:

1. Purana bakeri (Moulton, 1923)
2. Purana karimunjawa Duffels & Schouten, 2007
3. Purana latifascia Duffels & Schouten, 2007
4. Purana metallica Duffels & Schouten, 2007
5. Purana mulu Duffels & Schouten, 2007
6. Purana tigrina (Walker, 1850) - type species (as Dundubia tigrina Walker: designation as Purana Distant, 1905)
7. Purana usnani Duffels & Schouten, 2007

A substantial number of species have been moved to new (2024) genera such as Indopurana, Metapurana, Philipurana and Purapurana; in addition, others are currently (June 2025) placed incertae sedis in the subtribe Puranina Lee, 2013. Amongst the latter, is a species recorded east of the Wallace Line: "Purana celebensis", from Sulawesi.

62 species names were previously placed here, also including:

- Purana abdominalis Lee, 2009
- Purana atroclunes Boulard, 2002
- Purana australis (Kato, 1944)
- Purana barbosae (Distant, 1889)
- Purana campanula Pringle, 1955
- Purana capricornis Kos & Gogala, 2000
- Purana carmente (Walker, F., 1850)
- Purana carolettae Esaki, 1936
- Purana celebensis (Breddin, 1901)
- Purana chueatae Boulard, 2007
- Purana conifacies (Walker, F., 1858)
- Purana conspicua Distant, 1910
- Purana crassinotata Lee, 2015
- Purana davidi Distant, 1905
- Purana dimidia Chou & Lei, 1997
- Purana doiluangensis Boulard, 2005
- Purana gemella Boulard, 2006
- Purana gigas (Kato, 1930)
- Purana guttularis (Walker, F., 1858)
- Purana hermes Schouten & Duffels, 2002
- Purana hirundo (Walker, F., 1850)
- Purana infuscata Schouten & Duffels, 2002
- Purana iwasakii Matsumura, 1913
- Purana jacobsoni Distant, 1912
- Purana jdmoorei Boulard, 2005
- Purana johanae Boulard, 2005
- Purana khaosokensis Boulard, 2007
- Purana khuanae Boulard, 2002
- Purana khuniensis Boulard, 2005
- Purana kpaworensis Boulard, 2006
- Purana mickhuanae Boulard, 2009
- Purana montana Kos & Gogala, 2000
- Purana morrisi (Distant, 1892)
- Purana nana Lee, 2009
- Purana natae Boulard, 2006
- Purana nebulilinea (Walker, F., 1868)
- Purana niasica Kos & Gogala, 2000
- Purana notatissima Jacobi, 1944
- Purana obducta Schouten & Duffels, 2002
- Purana opaca Lee, 2009
- Purana parvituberculata Kos & Gogala, 2000
- Purana phetchabuna Boulard, 2008
- Purana pigmentata Distant, 1905
- Purana pryeri (Distant, 1881)
- Purana ptorti Boulard, 2007
- Purana sagittata Schouten & Duffels, 2002
- Purana taipinensis (Kato, 1944)
- Purana tanae Boulard, 2006
- Purana tavoyana Ollenbach, 1928
- Purana tigrinaformis Boulard, 2007
- Purana tigroides (Walker, 1858)
- Purana tripunctata Moulton, J.C., 1923
- Purana trui Pham, Schouten & Yang, 2012
- Purana ubina Moulton, J.C., 1923
- Purana vesperalba Boulard, 2009
- Purana vindevogheli Boulard, 2008
