= Paharia (cicada) =

Scientific classification
- Domain: Eukaryota
- Kingdom: Animalia
- Phylum: Arthropoda
- Class: Insecta
- Order: Hemiptera
- Suborder: Auchenorrhyncha
- Family: Cicadidae
- Genus: Paharia

Genus of true bugs

Paharia is a genus of cicadas in the family Cicadidae. There are at least four described species in Paharia.

== Species ==
These four species belong to the genus Paharia:

- Paharia lacteipennis (Walker, F., 1850)^{c g}
- Paharia putoni (Distant, 1892)^{c g}
- Paharia semenovi (Oshanin, 1906)^{c g}
- Paharia zevara (Kusnezov, 1931)^{c g}

Data sources: i = ITIS, c = Catalogue of Life, g = GBIF, b = Bugguide.net
