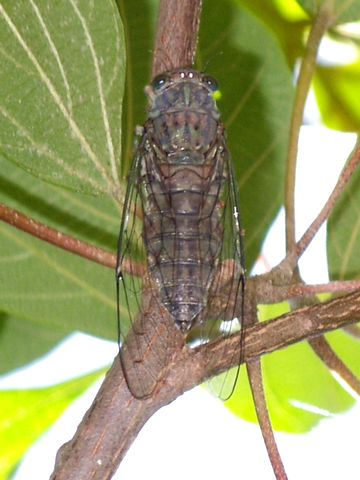
- Euterpnosia chibensis

Scientific classification
- Domain: Eukaryota
- Kingdom: Animalia
- Phylum: Arthropoda
- Class: Insecta
- Order: Hemiptera
- Suborder: Auchenorrhyncha
- Family: Cicadidae
- Subfamily: Cicadinae
- Tribe: Leptopsaltriini; Moulton, 1923

= Leptopsaltriini =

Tribe of true bugs

Leptopsaltriini is a tribe of cicadas in the family Cicadidae. There are at least 200 described species in Leptopsaltriini, found in the Palearctic, Nearctic, and Indomalaya.

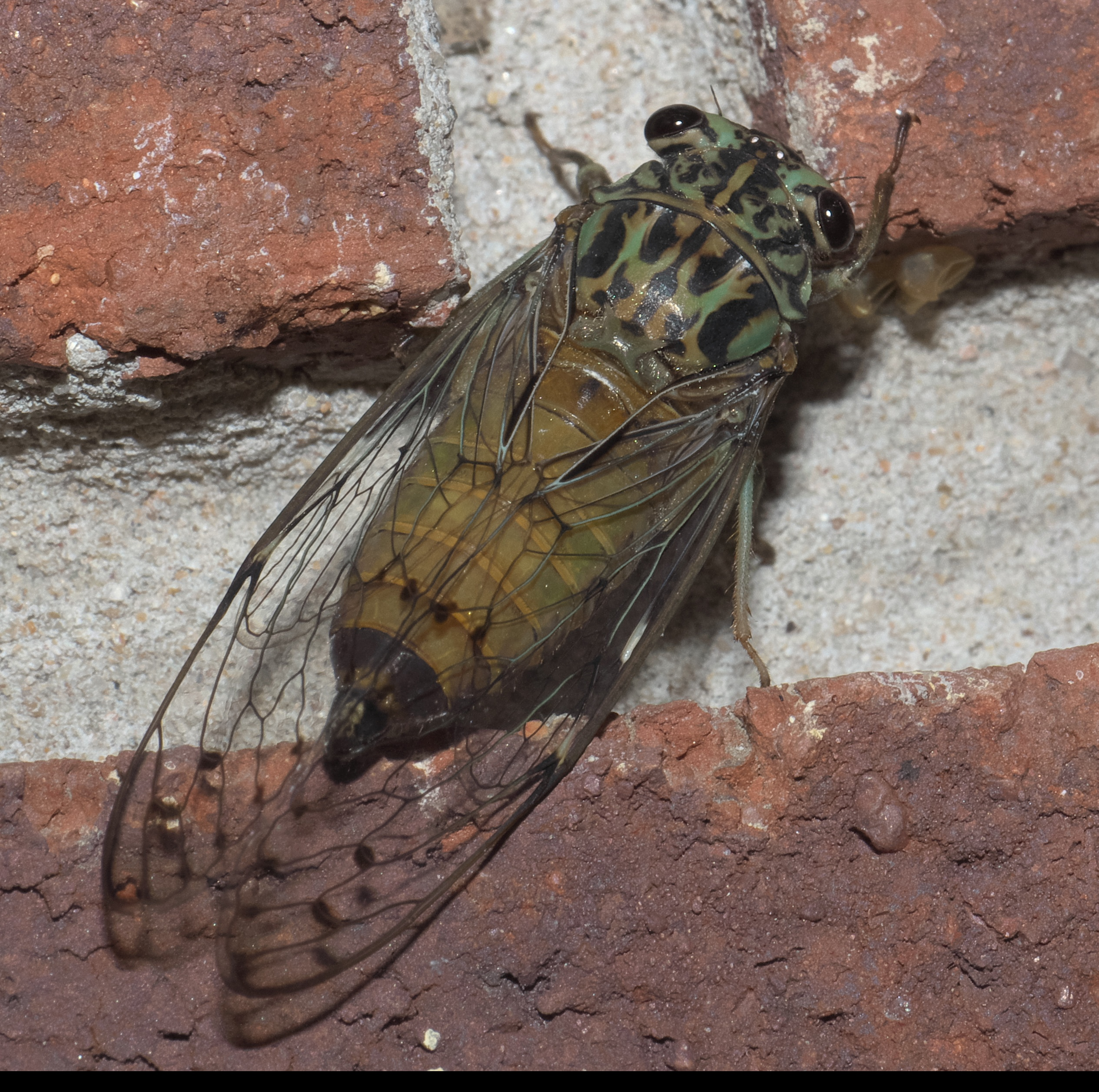
Neocicada hieroglyphica

== Genera ==
The World Auchenorrhyncha Database includes the following genera in six subtribes:

subtribe Euterpnosiina Lee, 2013

1. Calcagninus Distant, 1892^{c g}
2. Euterpnosia Matsumura, 1917^{c g}
3. Miniterpnosia Lee, 2013^{c g}
4. Neoterpnosia Lee & Emery, 2014^{c g}
5. Paranosia Lee, 2014^{c g}
6. Yezoterpnosia Matsumura, 1917^{c g}

subtribe Gudabina Boulard, 2008

1. Rustia Stål, 1866 (synonym Gudaba Distant, 1906)

=== subtribe Leptopsaltriina ===
Authority: J.C. Moulton, 1923; distribution: Nearctic and Indomalayan realms

1. Aetanna Lee, 2014^{c g}
2. Brevitanna Lee, 2022
3. Cabecita Lee, 2014^{c g}
4. Formocicada Lee & Hayashi, 2004^{c g}
5. Galgoria Lee, 2016^{c g}
6. Inthaxara Distant, 1913^{c g}
7. Leptopsaltria Stål, 1866^{c g}
8. Nabalua Moulton, 1923^{c g}
9. Taiwanosemia Matsumura, 1917^{c g}
10. Tanna Distant, 1905^{c g}
11. Terpnosia Distant, 1892
12. Vietanna Lee & Pham, 2021

subtribe Leptosemiina Lee, 2013

1. Leptosemia Matsumura, 1917^{c g}
2. Minipomponia Boulard, 2008^{c g}
3. Neocicada Kato, 1932
4. Puranoides Moulton, 1917^{c g}

subtribe Mosaicina Lee, 2013

1. Manna Lee & Emery, 2013^{c g}
2. Masamia Lee & Emery, 2013^{c g}
3. Mosaica Lee & Emery, 2013^{c g}

Data sources: c = Catalogue of Life, g = GBIF,

=== subtribe Puranina ===
Authority: Lee, 2013; distribution: South and South-East Asia

1. Formosemia Matsumura, 1917 (monotypic)
2. Indopurana Lee, 2024
3. Maua Distant, 1905
4. Metapurana Lee, 2024
5. Paratanna Lee, 2012 (monotypic)
6. Philipurana Lee, 2024
7. Purana Distant, 1905
8. Purapurana Lee, 2024
9. Qurana Lee, 2009 (monotypic)
10. †Tanyocicada Moulds, 2020: monotypic †Tanyocicada lapidescens (Zhang, 1989)

The following is a list of selected species names, which are currently (June 2025) placed incertae sedis in the subtribe Puranina:

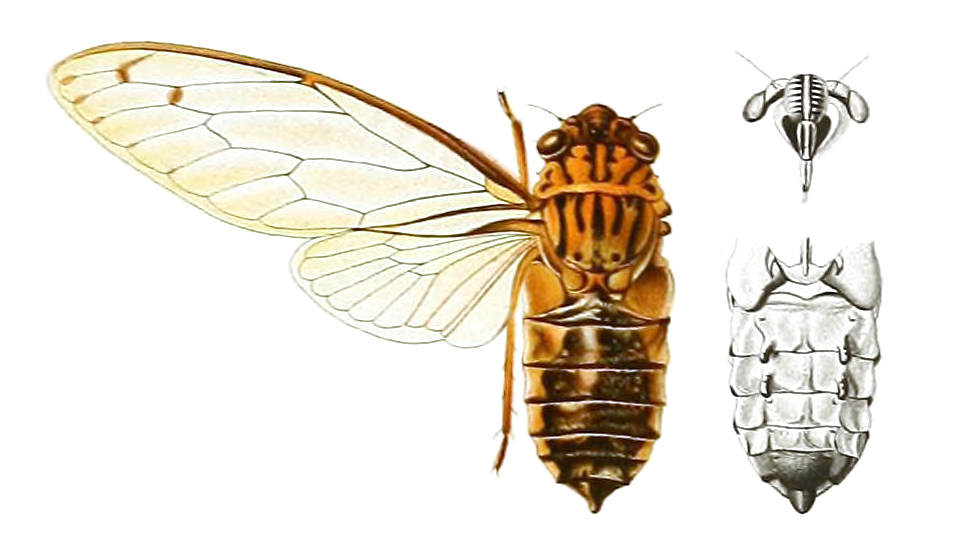
"Purana conspicua"

- Purana [Cicada] conifacies Walker, 1858
- [Cicada] guttularis Walker, 1858
- [Cicada] hirundo Walker, 1850
- Purana [Formosemia] australis Kato, 1944
- [Formosemia] gigas Kato, 1930
- [Formosemia] taipinensis Kato, 1944
- Purana [Leptopsaltria] celebensis Breddin, 1901
- [Purana] conspicua Distant, 1910
- [Purana] davidi Distant, 1905
- others
