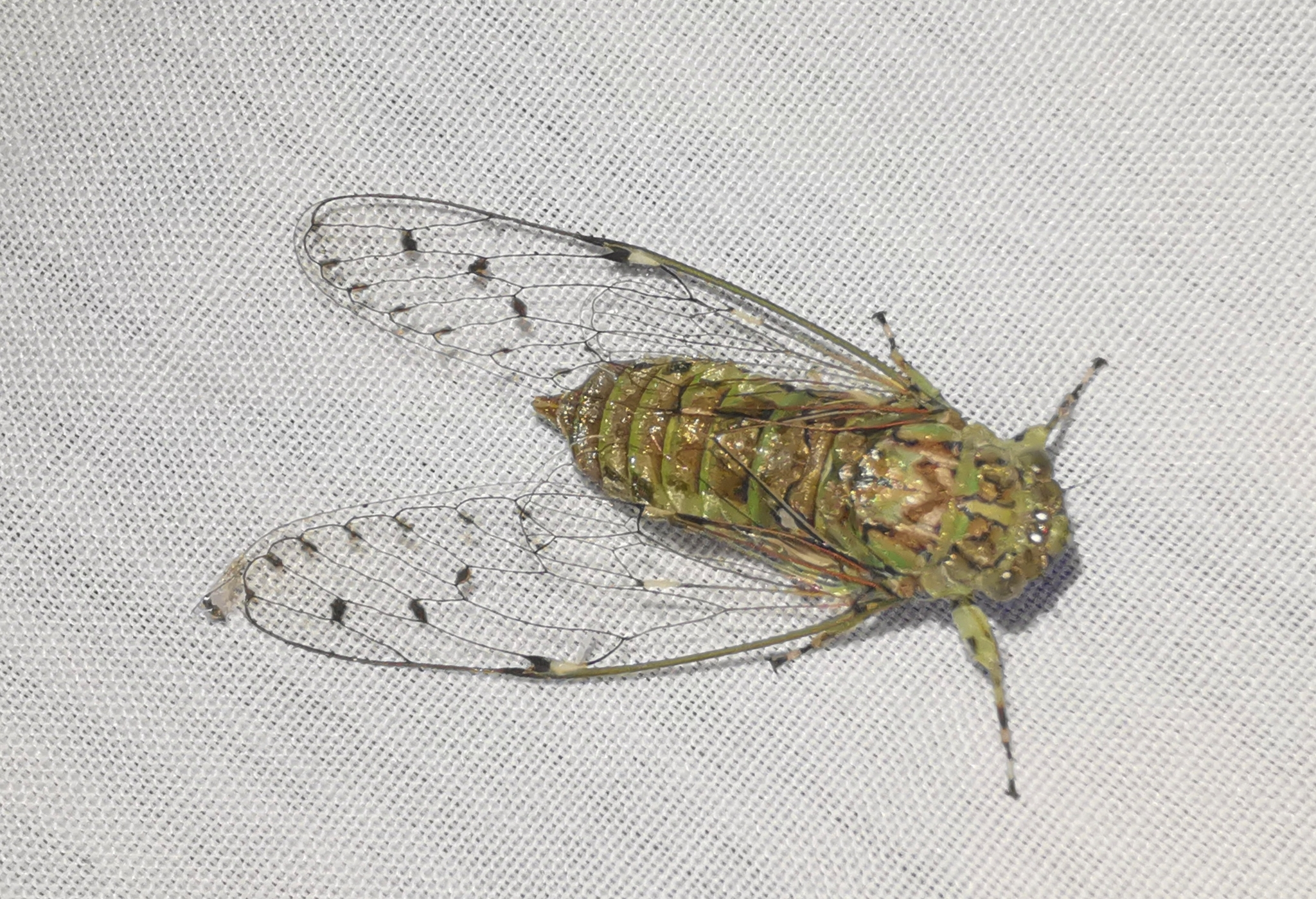
- Paranosia abdullah

Scientific classification
- Domain: Eukaryota
- Kingdom: Animalia
- Phylum: Arthropoda
- Class: Insecta
- Order: Hemiptera
- Suborder: Auchenorrhyncha
- Family: Cicadidae
- Tribe: Leptopsaltriini
- Subtribe: Euterpnosiina
- Genus: Paranosia; Lee, 2014

= Paranosia =

Genus of cicadas

Paranosia is a genus of Asian cicadas in the tribe Leptopsaltriini (subtribe Euterpnosiina), erected by Young June Lee in 2014; he named it from the Greek: παρά (near) and the similar genus Terpnosia.

Species distribution records include: India, the Himalayas, China, Indochina and western Malesia.

== Species ==
The World Auchenorrhyncha Database includes:

1. Paranosia abdullah (Distant, 1904)
2. Paranosia andersoni (Distant, 1892) - type species (by original designation of Paranosia Lee, 2014)
3. Paranosia clio (Walker, 1850)
4. Paranosia himachalensis Saddam, Wang & Kumar, 2025
5. Paranosia nonusaprilis (Boulard, 2003)
