= Miniterpnosia =

Scientific classification
- Domain: Eukaryota
- Kingdom: Animalia
- Phylum: Arthropoda
- Class: Insecta
- Order: Hemiptera
- Suborder: Auchenorrhyncha
- Family: Cicadidae
- Tribe: Leptopsaltriini
- Subtribe: Euterpnosiina
- Genus: Miniterpnosia; Lee, 2013

Genus of cicadas

External image
- Images at iNaturalist

Miniterpnosia is a genus of Asian cicadas in the tribe Leptopsaltriini (subtribe Euterpnosiina), erected by Young June Lee in 2013; he named it from the Greek: μινύς (small) and the similar genus Terpnosia.

Species distribution records are from central China, Laos and Vietnam.

== Species ==
The World Auchenorrhyncha Database includes:

1. Miniterpnosia chorus Lee, 2013 – type species - Vietnam
2. Miniterpnosia mega (Chou & Lei, 1997)
