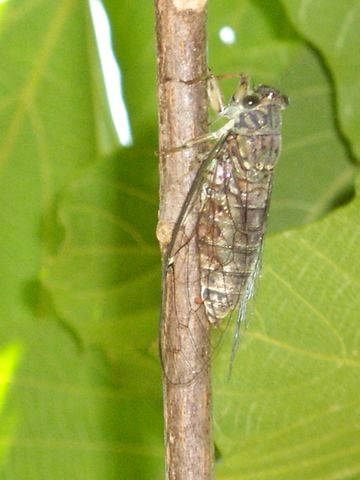
- Euterpnosia chibensis

Scientific classification
- Kingdom: Animalia
- Phylum: Arthropoda
- Class: Insecta
- Order: Hemiptera
- Suborder: Auchenorrhyncha
- Family: Cicadidae
- Subfamily: Cicadinae
- Tribe: Leptopsaltriini
- Subtribe: Euterpnosiina
- Genus: Euterpnosia; Matsumura, 1917

= Euterpnosia =

Genus of cicadas

Euterpnosia is a genus of cicada native to the island of Formosa, the Ryukyu Archipelago, Japan, Hainan and mainland Asia - China, Bhutan, Nepal and Vietnam. The type species is Euterpnosia chibensis Matsumura, 1917. Until 2013 this genus was placed in the subtribe Leptopsaltriina, but is now considered typical of the subtribe Euterpnosiina Lee, 2013.

== Species ==
The World Auchenorrhyncha Database includes:

1. Euterpnosia alpina Chen, 2005
2. Euterpnosia ampla Chen, 2006
3. Euterpnosia arisana Kato, 1925
4. Euterpnosia chibensis _{(ja)} Matsumura, 1917
5. Euterpnosia chilanensis Chen, Hsieh, Chen, Chen & Chang, 2022
6. Euterpnosia chinensis Kato, 1940 from T'ien Mu-shan,
7. Euterpnosia chishingsana Chen & Shiao, 2008
8. Euterpnosia crowfooti (Distant, 1912) (originally Terpnosia crowfooti) mentioned by Hayashi
9. Euterpnosia cucphuongensis Pham, Ta & Yang, 2010
10. Euterpnosia gina Kato, 1931
11. Euterpnosia hohogura Kato, 1933
12. Euterpnosia hoppo _{(zh)} Matsumura, 1917
13. Euterpnosia iwasakii (Matsumura, 1913) locale Ryukyu Archipelago,
14. Euterpnosia koshunensis Kato, 1927
15. Euterpnosia kotoshoensis Kato, 1925
16. Euterpnosia laii Lee, 2003
17. Euterpnosia latacauta Chen & Shiao, 2008
18. Euterpnosia madawdawensis Chen, 2005
19. Euterpnosia madhava (Distant, 1881) mentioned by Hayashi
20. Euterpnosia okinawana Ishihara, 1968 locale Ryukyu Archipelago,
21. Euterpnosia olivacea Kato, 1927
22. Euterpnosia ruida Lei & Chou, 1997
23. Euterpnosia sinensis Chen, 1940 locale not known, publication not known
24. Euterpnosia suishana Kato, 1931
25. Euterpnosia varicolor Kato, 1926
26. Euterpnosia viridifrons Matsumura, 1917

== Others named Euterpnosia ==
The following are either not Euterpnosia, or there is insufficient information to make a determination as to their current status.

- Euterpnosia inanulata Kishida, 1929 was a female Leptosemia takanonis.
