= Sinapsaltria =

Scientific classification
- Domain: Eukaryota
- Kingdom: Animalia
- Phylum: Arthropoda
- Class: Insecta
- Order: Hemiptera
- Suborder: Auchenorrhyncha
- Family: Cicadidae
- Tribe: Dundubiini
- Subtribe: Aolina
- Genus: Sinapsaltria; Kato, 1940

Genus of cicadas

Sinapsaltria is a genus of Asian cicadas in the tribe Dundubiini (subtribe Aolina); it was originally erected by Masayo Kato in 1940, who named it after China (Latin: Sina-) and the Greek ψαλτρία (meaning 'female harper'), which is an ending for several generic names within the family Cicadidae. Species have been recorded from Vietnam and Hainan island.

== Species ==
The World Auchenorrhyncha Database includes:

1. Sinapsaltria annamensis Kato, 1940 - Vietnam
2. Sinapsaltria typica Kato, 1940 - type species - Hainan
