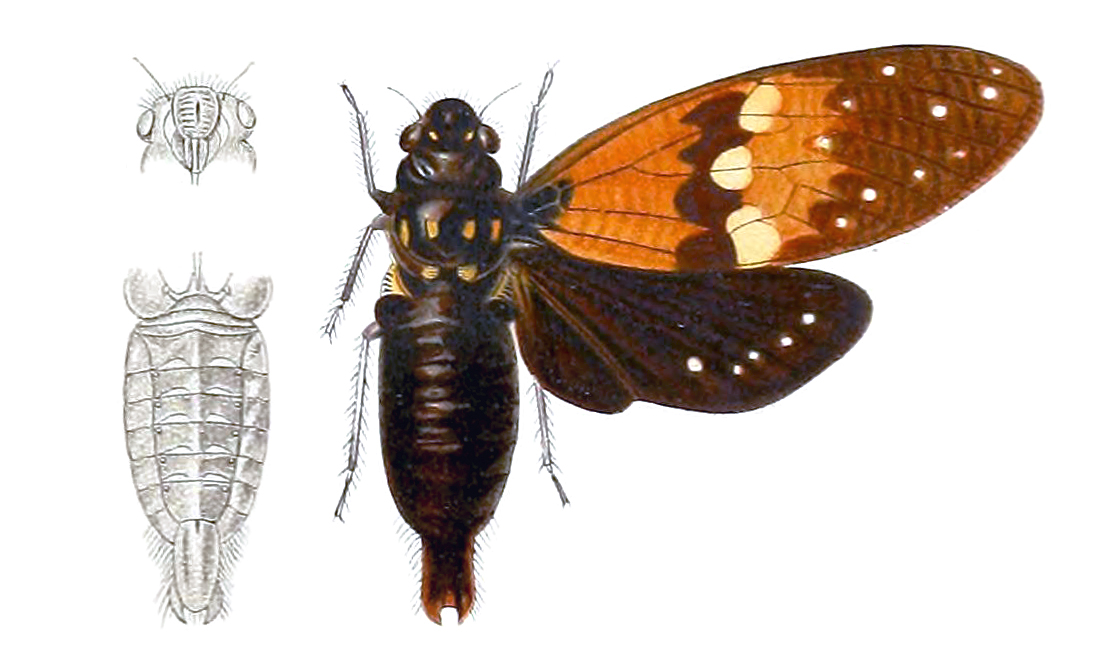
- Ambragaeana stellata

Scientific classification
- Domain: Eukaryota
- Kingdom: Animalia
- Phylum: Arthropoda
- Class: Insecta
- Order: Hemiptera
- Suborder: Auchenorrhyncha
- Family: Cicadidae
- Subfamily: Cicadinae
- Tribe: Gaeanini
- Genus: Ambragaeana; Chou & Yao, 1985

= Ambragaeana =

Genus of true bugs

Ambragaeana is a genus of Asian cicadas in the tribe Gaeanini. This genus was previously placed in Gaeana and species in this tribe are often called "butterfly cicadas" because of the colours and patterns of their wings.

== Species ==
The Catalogue of Life lists:

- Ambragaeana ambra Chou & Yao, 1985 - type species
- Ambragaeana laosensis (Distant, 1917)
- Ambragaeana stellata (Walker F, 1858)
- Ambragaeana sticta (Chou & Yao, 1985)
