= Aetanna =

Scientific classification
- Kingdom: Animalia
- Phylum: Arthropoda
- Class: Insecta
- Order: Hemiptera
- Suborder: Auchenorrhyncha
- Family: Cicadidae
- Tribe: Leptopsaltriini
- Subtribe: Leptopsaltriina
- Genus: Aetanna; Lee, 2014

Genus of cicadas

External image
- Images at iNaturalist

Aetanna is a genus of Asian cicadas in the tribe Leptopsaltriini (subtribe Leptopsaltriina), erected by Young June Lee in 2014. He named it from the Korean: 애 (pronounced 'ae', meaning small or child) and the similar genus Tanna.

Species distribution records include: India including the Andaman Islands, China, Indochina, Malesia through to New Guinea.

== Species ==
The World Auchenorrhyncha Database includes:

1. Aetanna condyla (Chou & Lei, 1997)
2. Aetanna curta Lee, 2014
3. Aetanna minor (Hayashi, 1978)
4. Aetanna pallidula Lee, 2014 – type species
5. Aetanna shensiensis (Sanborn, 2006)
6. Aetanna thalia (Walker, 1850)
7. Aetanna tigroides (Walker, 1858)
8. Aetanna ventrirosea (Boulard, 2003)
9. Aetanna yanni (Boulard, 2003)
10. Aetanna yunnanensis (Lei & Chou, 1997)
