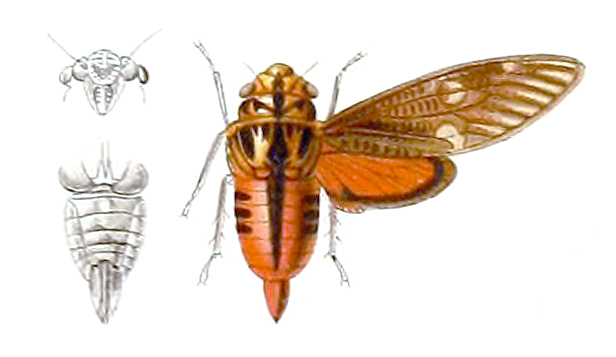
- Balinta auriginea

Scientific classification
- Kingdom: Animalia
- Phylum: Arthropoda
- Clade: Pancrustacea
- Class: Insecta
- Order: Hemiptera
- Suborder: Auchenorrhyncha
- Family: Cicadidae
- Subfamily: Cicadinae
- Tribe: Gaeanini
- Genus: Balinta; Distant, 1905

= Balinta =

Genus of true bugs

Balinta is a genus of Asian cicadas in the tribe Gaeanini, erected by William Lucas Distant in 1905. Species have been recorded from China (including Hainan Island) and Indochina.

== Species ==
The Global Biodiversity Information Facility includes:

1. Balinta auriginea Distant, 1905
2. Balinta delinenda (Distant, 1888)
3. Balinta flavoterminalia Boulard, 2008
4. Balinta kershawi Kirkaldy, 1909
5. Balinta minuta Boulard, 2008
6. Balinta octonotata (Westwood, 1845)
7. Balinta pulchella Distant, 1913
8. Balinta sanguiniventris Ollenbach, 1928
9. Balinta tenebricosa (Distant, 1888)
