= Manna (cicada) =

Scientific classification
- Kingdom: Animalia
- Phylum: Arthropoda
- Clade: Pancrustacea
- Class: Insecta
- Order: Hemiptera
- Suborder: Auchenorrhyncha
- Family: Cicadidae
- Tribe: Leptopsaltriini
- Genus: Manna

Genus of true bugs

Manna is a genus of cicadas in the family Cicadidae. There is at least one described species in Manna, M. tenuis.
