= Ollanta (cicada) =

Scientific classification
- Kingdom: Animalia
- Phylum: Arthropoda
- Class: Insecta
- Order: Hemiptera
- Suborder: Auchenorrhyncha
- Family: Cicadidae
- Subtribe: Guyalnina
- Genus: Ollanta; Distant, 1905

Genus of true bugs

Ollanta is a genus of cicadas in the family Cicadidae. There are at least four described species in Ollanta.

== Species ==
These four species belong to the genus Ollanta:

- Ollanta caicosensis Davis, 1939^{i c g}
- Ollanta melvini Ramos, 1983^{i c g}
- Ollanta mexicana Distant, 1905^{i c g}
- Ollanta modesta (Distant, 1881)^{i c g}

Data sources: i = ITIS, c = Catalogue of Life, g = GBIF, b = Bugguide.net
