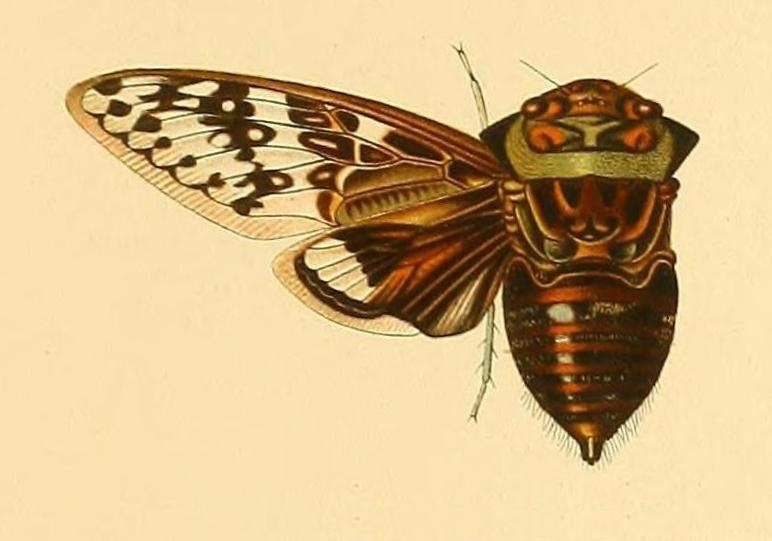
- Muansa clypealis, male

Scientific classification
- Kingdom: Animalia
- Phylum: Arthropoda
- Clade: Pancrustacea
- Class: Insecta
- Order: Hemiptera
- Suborder: Auchenorrhyncha
- Family: Cicadidae
- Subfamily: Cicadinae
- Tribe: Platypleurini
- Genus: Muansa; Distant, 1904
- Species: M. clypealis

Binomial name
- Muansa clypealis (Karsch, 1890)

= Muansa =

Genus of true bugs

Muansa is an Afrotropical genus of cicadas. The only species is Muansa clypealis.
