= Mata (cicada) =

Scientific classification
- Kingdom: Animalia
- Phylum: Arthropoda
- Clade: Pancrustacea
- Class: Insecta
- Order: Hemiptera
- Suborder: Auchenorrhyncha
- Family: Cicadidae
- Tribe: Oncotympanini
- Genus: Mata; Distant, 1906

Species
- 5, see text.

Genus of true bugs

Mata is a genus of cicadas in the family Cicadidae. There are currently five described species in Mata. In 2021, three new species were described from Meghalaya, India.

== Species ==
These five species belong to the genus Mata:

- Mata kama (Distant, 1881)
- Mata lenonia Sarkar, Mahapatra, Mohapatra, Nair & Kunte, 2021
- Mata meghalayana Sarkar, Mahapatra, Mohapatra, Nair & Kunte, 2021
- Mata rama Distant, 1912
- Mata ruffordii Sarkar, Mahapatra, Mohapatra, Nair & Kunte, 2021
