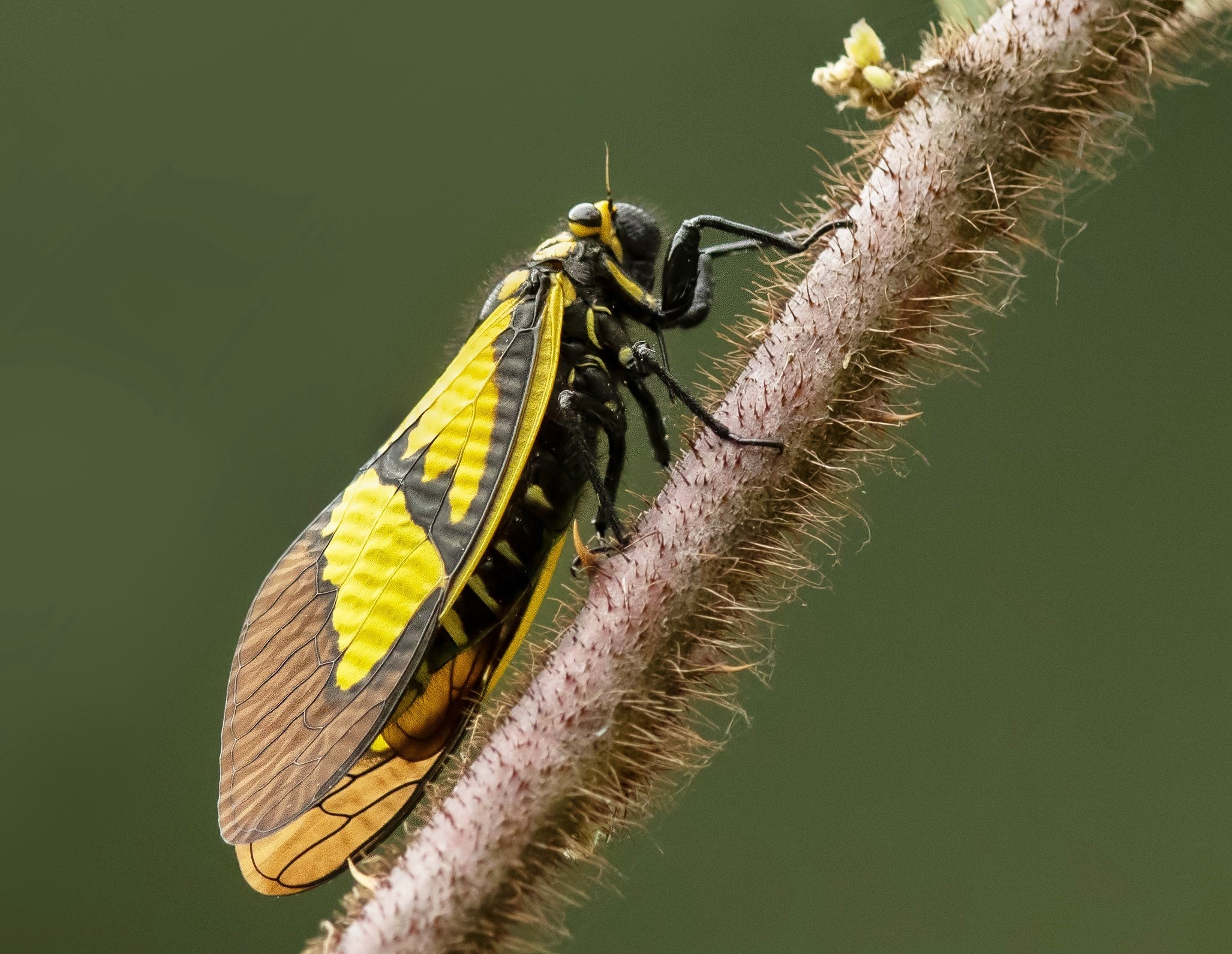
- Sulphogaeana sulphurea

Scientific classification
- Kingdom: Animalia
- Phylum: Arthropoda
- Class: Insecta
- Order: Hemiptera
- Suborder: Auchenorrhyncha
- Family: Cicadidae
- Tribe: Gaeanini
- Genus: Sulphogaeana; Chou & Yao, 1985

Type species
- Sulphogaeana sulphurea (Westwood, 1839)

= Sulphogaeana =

Genus of true bugs

Sulphogaeana is a genus of cicadas found in Asia from the Himalayas east to Laos and Vietnam. They were earlier included in the genus Gaeana.

== Species ==
Species in the genus include:

1. Sulphogaeana dolicha Lei, 1997
2. Sulphogaeana sulphurea (Westwood, 1839)
3. Sulphogaeana vestita (Distant, 1905)
