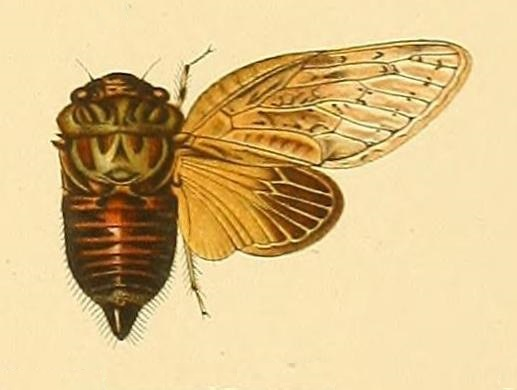
- Kongota punctigera, female

Scientific classification
- Kingdom: Animalia
- Phylum: Arthropoda
- Clade: Pancrustacea
- Class: Insecta
- Order: Hemiptera
- Suborder: Auchenorrhyncha
- Family: Cicadidae
- Subfamily: Cicadinae
- Tribe: Platypleurini
- Genus: Kongota; Distant, 1904

Species
- See text

= Kongota =

Genus of true bugs

Kongota is a genus of cicadas from Southeast Africa.
