= Ariasa =

Scientific classification
- Kingdom: Animalia
- Phylum: Arthropoda
- Clade: Pancrustacea
- Class: Insecta
- Order: Hemiptera
- Suborder: Auchenorrhyncha
- Family: Cicadidae
- Genus: Ariasa; Distant, 1905

Genus of insects

Ariasa is a genus of true bugs belonging to the family Cicadidae.

The species of this genus are found in South America.

Species:

- Ariasa albimaculosa Sanborn, 2016
- Ariasa albiplica (Walker, 1858)
- Ariasa alboapicata (Distant, 1905)
- Ariasa arechavaletae (Berg, 1884)
- Ariasa bartletti Sanborn, 2016
- Ariasa bilaqueata (Uhler, 1903)
- Ariasa colombiae (Distant, 1892)
- Ariasa diupsilon (Walker, 1850)
- Ariasa egregia (Uhler, 1903)
- Ariasa maryannae Sanborn, 2016
- Ariasa nigrorufa (Walker, 1850)
- Ariasa nigrovittata Distant, 1905
- Ariasa russelli Sanborn, 2016
- Ariasa urens (Walker, 1852)
- Ariasa venezuelaensis Sanborn, 2020
