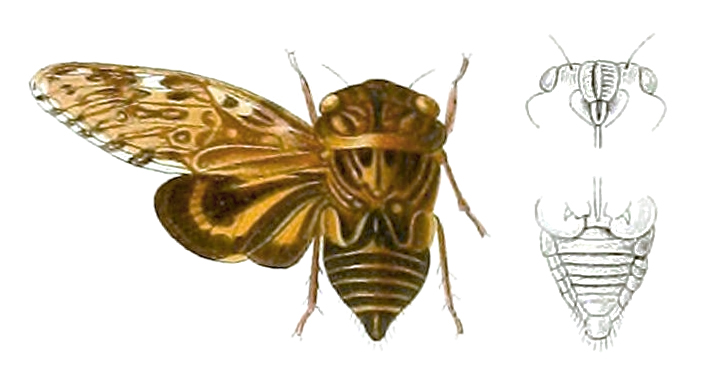
- Hazma ciliaris specimen

Scientific classification
- Kingdom: Animalia
- Phylum: Arthropoda
- Clade: Pancrustacea
- Class: Insecta
- Order: Hemiptera
- Suborder: Auchenorrhyncha
- Family: Cicadidae
- Subfamily: Cicadinae
- Tribe: Platypleurini
- Genus: Hamza; Distant, 1904
- Species: H. ciliaris

Binomial name
- Hamza ciliaris (Linnaeus, 1758)

Synonyms
- List: Platypleura arcuata Walker, 1858; Hamza boeruensis [sic] Distant, 1898; Platypleura bouruensis Distant, 1898; Poecilopsaltria catacaloides [sic] (Walker, 1868); Platypleura catocalina [sic] (Linnaeus, 1758); Platypleura catocaloides Walker, 1868; Platypleura cilialis [sic] (Linnaeus, 1758); Platypleura lyricen Kirkaldy, 1913; Tettigonia marmorata Fabricius, 1803; Cicada ocella [sic] (De Geer, 1773); Cicada ocellata De Geer, 1773; Hamza uchiyamae Matsumura, 1927; Cicada varia Olivier, 1791

= Hamza ciliaris =

Genus of cicadas

Hamza is a monotypic genus of cicadas in the tribe Platypleurini, erected by William Lucas Distant in 1904. The species Hamza ciliaris has been recorded from India, China, Indochina and Malesia.
