= Salvazana =

Scientific classification
- Kingdom: Animalia
- Phylum: Arthropoda
- Clade: Pancrustacea
- Class: Insecta
- Order: Hemiptera
- Suborder: Auchenorrhyncha
- Family: Cicadidae
- Tribe: Tacuini
- Subtribe: Tacuina
- Genus: Salvazana; Distant, 1913
- Species: S. mirabilis

Binomial name
- Salvazana mirabilis Distant, 1913

Synonyms
- Lyristes wui E.Schmidt, 1932; Pulchrocicada guangxiensis He, 1984; Pulchrocicada sinensis He, 1984; Salvazana imperialis Distant, 1918; Salvazana imperialis subsp. cheni Boulard, 2013; Salvazana mirabilis subsp. imperialis; Salvazana mirabilis subsp. mirabilis; Tibicen wui Kato, 1934

Genus of true bugs

Salvazana is a monotypic genus of Asian cicadas in the tribe Tacuini (subtribe Tacuina). The single species Salvazana mirabilis is recorded from Indochina: to date, specifically Thailand and Vietnam.
