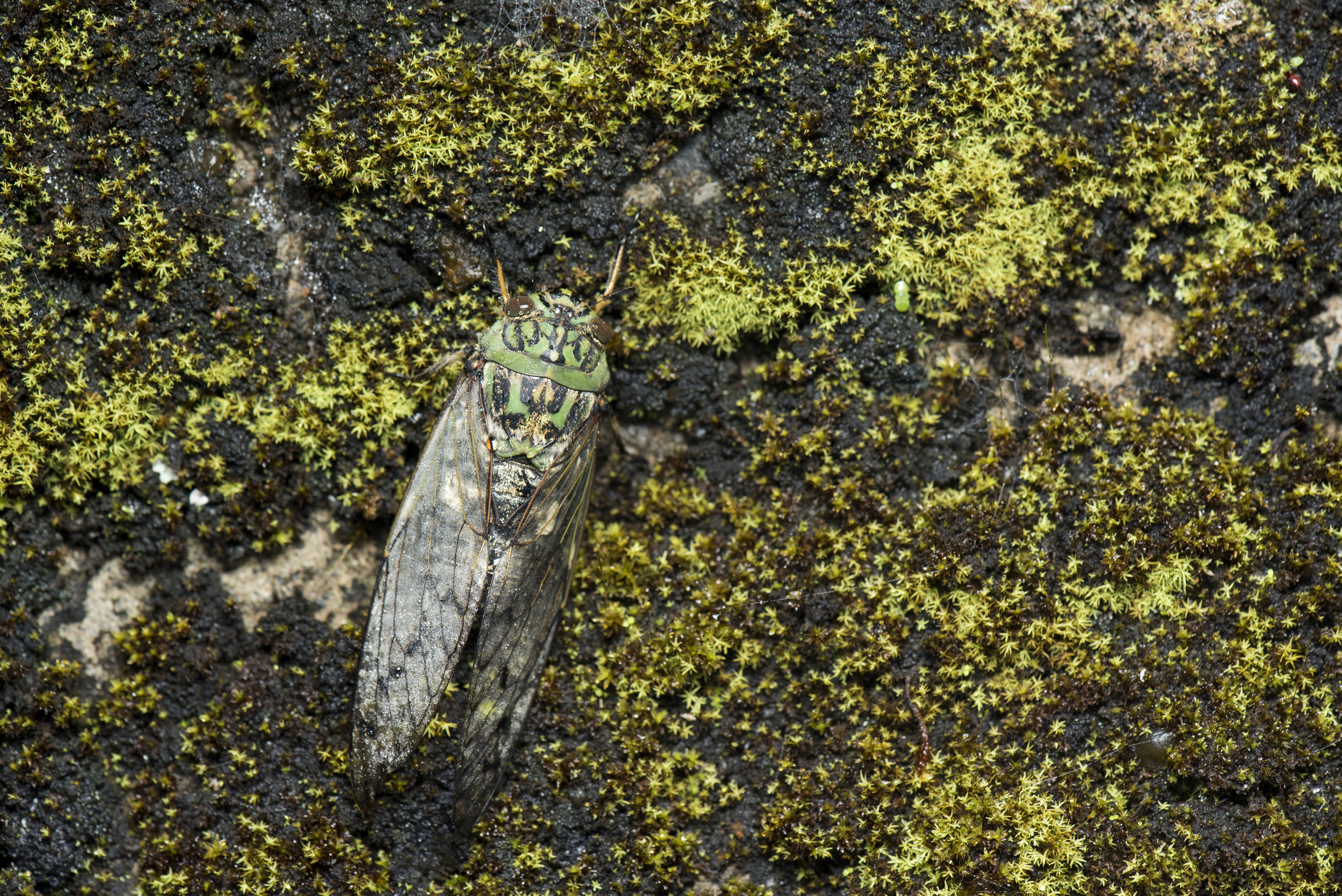
- Macrosemia kareisana

Scientific classification
- Domain: Eukaryota
- Kingdom: Animalia
- Phylum: Arthropoda
- Class: Insecta
- Order: Hemiptera
- Suborder: Auchenorrhyncha
- Family: Cicadidae
- Subfamily: Cicadinae
- Tribe: Dundubiini
- Genus: Macrosemia; Kato, 1925

= Macrosemia =

Genus of cicadas

External image
- Images at iNaturalist

Macrosemia is a genus of Asian cicadas in the tribe Dundubiini. Species records are from Taiwan and the eastern Asian mainland, including Indochina.

== Species ==
The World Auchenorrhyncha Database includes:

1. Macrosemia anhweiensis Ouchi, 1938
2. Macrosemia assamensis (Distant, 1905)
3. Macrosemia beaudouini (Boulard, 2003)
4. Macrosemia diana (Distant, 1905)
5. Macrosemia divergens (Distant, 1917)
6. Macrosemia fengi Wang, 2024
7. Macrosemia juno (Distant, 1905)
8. Macrosemia kareisana (Matsumura, 1907) - type species (as Platylomia hopponis Kato, 1925) - Japan, Taiwan
9. Macrosemia khuanae Boulard, 2001
10. Macrosemia kiangsuensis Kato, 1938
11. Macrosemia lamdongensis Pham, Bui & Constant, 2016
12. Macrosemia matsumurai (Kato, 1928)
13. Macrosemia perakana (Moulton & J.C., 1923)
14. Macrosemia sapaensis (Luu, Pham, Bui & Constant, 2022)
15. Macrosemia saturata (F.Walker, 1858)
16. Macrosemia suavicolor Boulard, 2008
17. Macrosemia tonkiniana (Jacobi, 1905)
18. Macrosemia umbrata (Distant, 1888)
  synonyms: Cosmopsaltria umbrata Distant, 1888; Macrosemia chantrainei Boulard, 2003; Platylomia umbrata Moulton & J.C., 1912
