= Calcagninus (cicada) =

Scientific classification
- Kingdom: Animalia
- Phylum: Arthropoda
- Clade: Pancrustacea
- Class: Insecta
- Order: Hemiptera
- Suborder: Auchenorrhyncha
- Family: Cicadidae
- Tribe: Leptopsaltriini
- Genus: Calcagninus

Genus of true bugs

Calcagninus is a genus of cicadas in the family Cicadidae. There are at least three described species in Calcagninus.

== Species ==
These three species belong to the genus Calcagninus:

- Calcagninus divaricatus Bliven, 1964^{c g}
- Calcagninus nilgirensis (Distant, 1887)^{c g}
- Calcagninus picturatus (Distant, 1888)^{c g}

Data sources: i = ITIS, c = Catalogue of Life, g = GBIF, b = Bugguide.net
