= Severiana (cicada) =

Scientific classification
- Kingdom: Animalia
- Phylum: Arthropoda
- Clade: Pancrustacea
- Class: Insecta
- Order: Hemiptera
- Suborder: Auchenorrhyncha
- Family: Cicadidae
- Genus: Severiana

Genus of true bugs

Severiana is a genus of cicadas in the family Cicadidae. There are at least three described species in Severiana.

== Species ==
These three species belong to the genus Severiana:

- Severiana magna Villet, 1999^{c g}
- Severiana severini (Distant, 1893)^{c g}
- Severiana similis (Schumacher, 1913)^{c g}

Data sources: i = ITIS, c = Catalogue of Life, g = GBIF, b = Bugguide.net
