= Inthaxara =

Scientific classification
- Kingdom: Animalia
- Phylum: Arthropoda
- Clade: Pancrustacea
- Class: Insecta
- Order: Hemiptera
- Suborder: Auchenorrhyncha
- Family: Cicadidae
- Subfamily: Cicadinae
- Tribe: Leptopsaltriini
- Subtribe: Leptopsaltriina
- Genus: Inthaxara; Distant, 1913

Genus of true bugs

External image
- Images at iNaturalist

Inthaxara is a genus of Asian cicadas in the tribe Leptopsaltriini (subtribe Leptopsaltriina); it was erected by William Lucas Distant in 1913. Species have been recorded from China and Vietnam.

== Species ==
The Global Biodiversity Information Facility includes:

1. Inthaxara flexa Lei & Li, 1996
2. Inthaxara olivacea Chen, 1940
3. Inthaxara rex Distant, 1913 – type species
