= Orapa (cicada) =

Scientific classification
- Kingdom: Animalia
- Phylum: Arthropoda
- Clade: Pancrustacea
- Class: Insecta
- Order: Hemiptera
- Suborder: Auchenorrhyncha
- Superfamily: Cicadoidea
- Family: Cicadidae
- Subfamily: Cicadinae
- Tribe: Platypleurini
- Genus: Orapa; Distant, 1905

Synonyms
- Orapia [sic] Distant, 1905

Genus of true bugs

Orapa is a genus of cicadas in the subfamily Cicadinae, found in sub-Saharan Africa. Orapa previously constituted the only genus in tribe Orapini, but is now placed in the Platypleurini.

== Species ==
The following species belong to the genus Orapa:

1. Orapa africana Kato, 1927
2. Orapa elliotti (Distant, 1907)
3. Orapa lateritia Jacobi, 1910
4. Orapa numa (Distant, 1904) - type species (as Pycna numa Distant)
5. Orapa tangana (Strand, 1910) (previously placed in genus Pycna)
6. Orapa uwembaiensis Boulard, 2012
