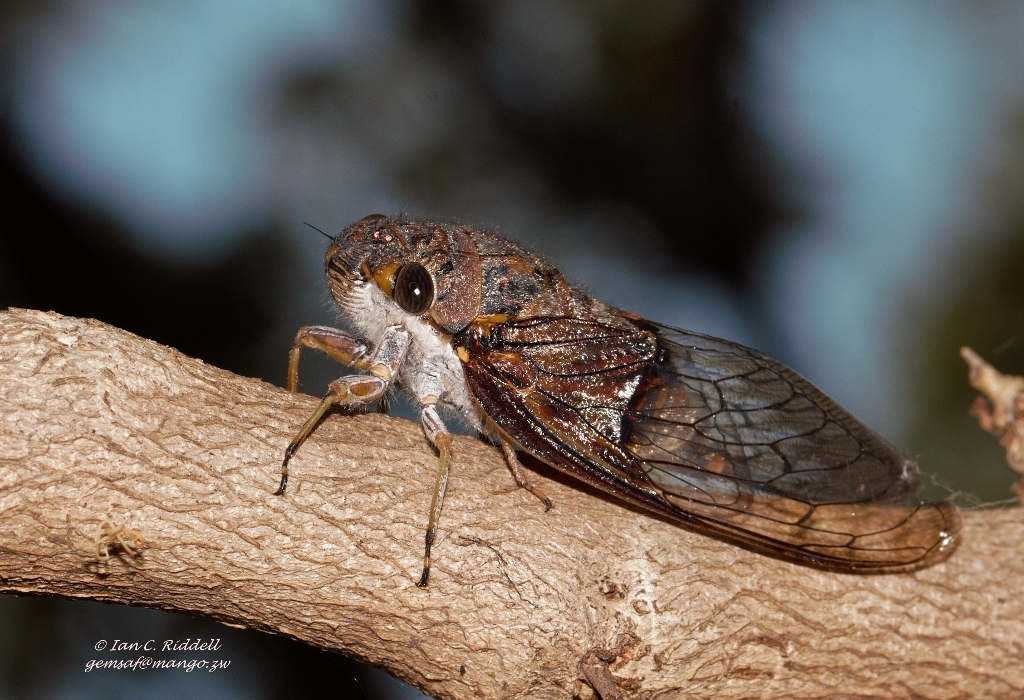
- Koma bombifrons, Zimbabwe

Scientific classification
- Kingdom: Animalia
- Phylum: Arthropoda
- Clade: Pancrustacea
- Class: Insecta
- Order: Hemiptera
- Suborder: Auchenorrhyncha
- Family: Cicadidae
- Subfamily: Cicadinae
- Tribe: Platypleurini
- Genus: Koma; Distant, 1904

Synonyms
- Kuma Distant, 1904

= Koma (cicada) =

Genus of true bugs

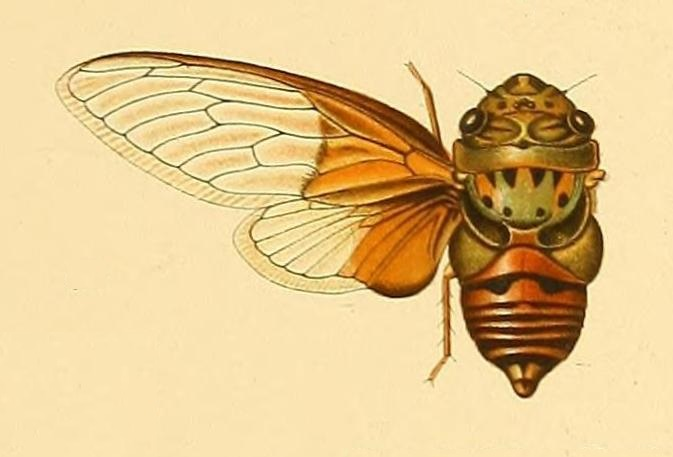
Koma bombifrons, male

Koma is a genus of Cicadas in the family Cicadidae. There are at least four described species in Koma, found in Africa.

== Species ==
These four species belong to the genus Koma:

- Koma bombifrons (Karsch, 1890)
- Koma intermedia Boulard, 1980
- Koma semivitrea (Distant, 1914)
- Koma umbrosa Boulard, 1980
