= Ayesha serva =

Scientific classification
- Kingdom: Animalia
- Phylum: Arthropoda
- Clade: Pancrustacea
- Class: Insecta
- Order: Hemiptera
- Suborder: Auchenorrhyncha
- Family: Cicadidae
- Tribe: Dundubiini
- Subtribe: Orientopsaltriina
- Genus: Ayesha; Distant, 1905
- Species: A. serva

Binomial name
- Ayesha serva (Walker, 1850)

Synonyms
- Species synonymy: Ayesha operculissima (Distant, 1881); Ayesha spathulata (Stål, 1870); Cicada elopurina Distant, 1888; Cosmopsaltria operculissima Distant, 1881; Cosmopsaltria operculissimam Distant, 1881; Cosmopsaltria serva (Walker, 1850); Cosmopsaltria spathulata Stål, 1870; Cosmopsaltria spathulata Stål, 1870; Cosmopsaltria vomerigera Breddin, 1901; Dundubia lelita Kirkaldy, 1902; Dundubia serva Walker, 1850

Genus of cicadas

Ayesha is a genus of cicadas in the tribe Dundubiini. There is only one described species, Ayesha serva, found in Borneo and Palawan islands.
