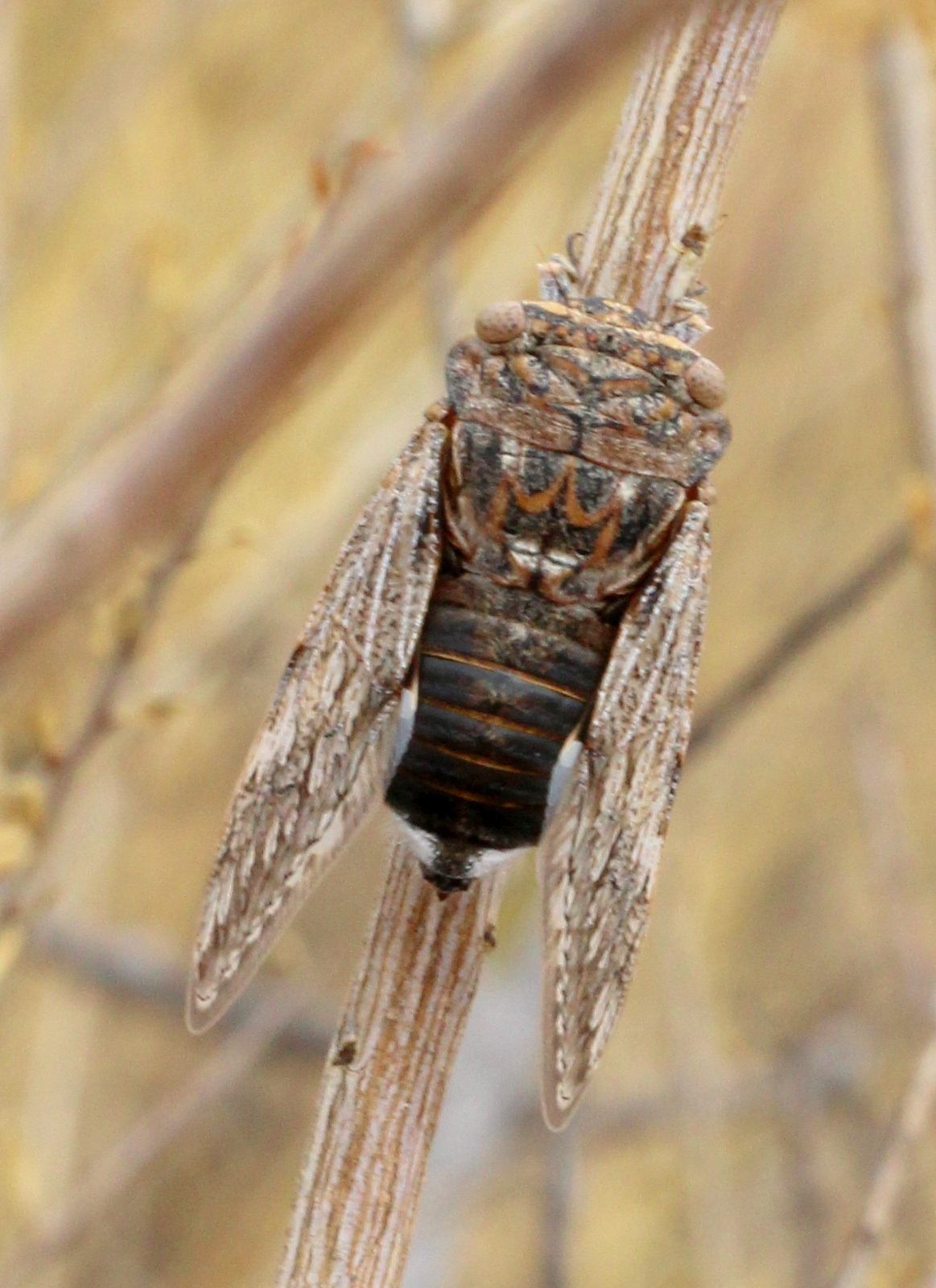
- Munza trimeni, South Africa

Scientific classification
- Kingdom: Animalia
- Phylum: Arthropoda
- Clade: Pancrustacea
- Class: Insecta
- Order: Hemiptera
- Suborder: Auchenorrhyncha
- Family: Cicadidae
- Subfamily: Cicadinae
- Tribe: Platypleurini
- Genus: Munza; Distant, 1904

Species
- See text

= Munza =

Genus of true bugs

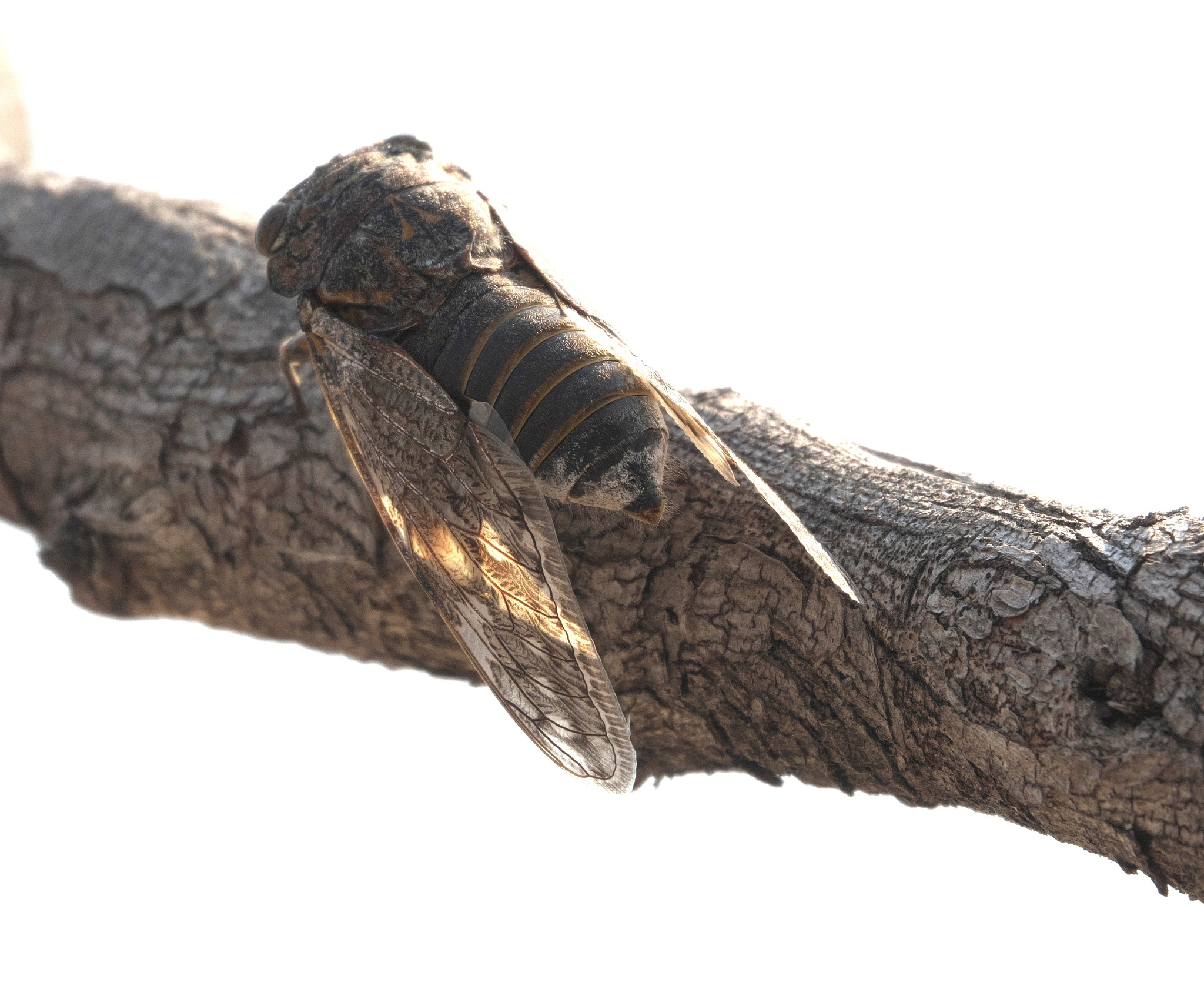
Munza, Botswana

Munza is a genus of cicadas in the family Cicadidae. There are about 11 described species in Munza, found in Sub-Saharan Africa.

== Species ==
These 11 species belong to the genus Munza:

- Munza basimacula (Walker, 1850) (Small Broadborder Cicada)
- Munza fulva (Distant, 1897)
- Munza karoiwae (Matsumura, 1917)
- Munza laticlavia (Stål, 1858)
- Munza otjosonduensis Schumacher, 1913
- Munza pallescens Schumacher, 1913
- Munza popovi Boulard, 1975
- Munza revoili Distant, 1905
- Munza straeleni Dlabola, 1960
- Munza trimeni (Distant, 1892)
- Munza venusta Hesse, 1925
