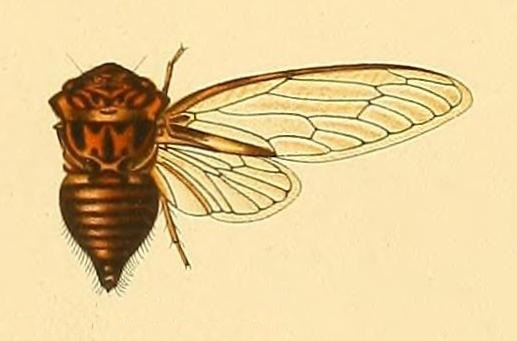
- Sadaka hyalina, female

Scientific classification
- Kingdom: Animalia
- Phylum: Arthropoda
- Clade: Pancrustacea
- Class: Insecta
- Order: Hemiptera
- Suborder: Auchenorrhyncha
- Family: Cicadidae
- Subfamily: Cicadinae
- Tribe: Platypleurini
- Genus: Sadaka; Distant, 1904

Species
- See text

= Sadaka (cicada) =

Genus of true bugs

Sadaka is a genus of cicadas from West Africa.

== Species ==
These six species belong to the genus Sadaka:

- Sadaka aurovirens Dlabola, 1960^{c g}
- Sadaka dimidiata (Karsch, 1893)^{c g}
- Sadaka morini Boulard, 1985^{c g}
- Sadaka radiata (Karsch, 1890)^{c g}
- Sadaka sagittifera Boulard, 1985^{c g}
- Sadaka virescens (Karsch, 1890)^{c g}

Data sources: i = ITIS, c = Catalogue of Life, g = GBIF, b = Bugguide.net
