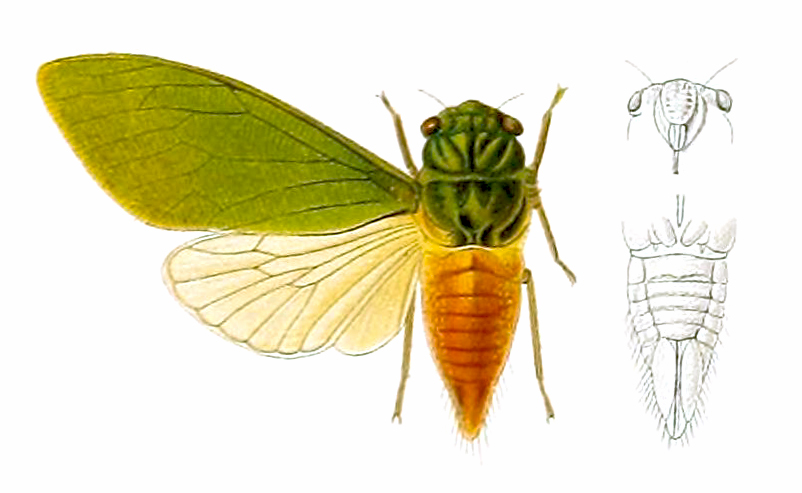
- Taona versicolor

Scientific classification
- Domain: Eukaryota
- Kingdom: Animalia
- Phylum: Arthropoda
- Class: Insecta
- Order: Hemiptera
- Suborder: Auchenorrhyncha
- Family: Cicadidae
- Genus: Taona; Distant, 1909

Type species
- Taona versicolor Distant, 1909

= Taona (cicada) =

Genus of true bugs

Taona is a genus of cicadas in the family Cicadidae. Taona species records are only from China.

== Species ==
These two species belong to the genus Taona:

- Taona immaculata Chen, K.F., 1940^{c g}
- Taona versicolor Distant, 1909^{c g}

Data sources: i = ITIS, c = Catalogue of Life, g = GBIF, b = Bugguide.net
