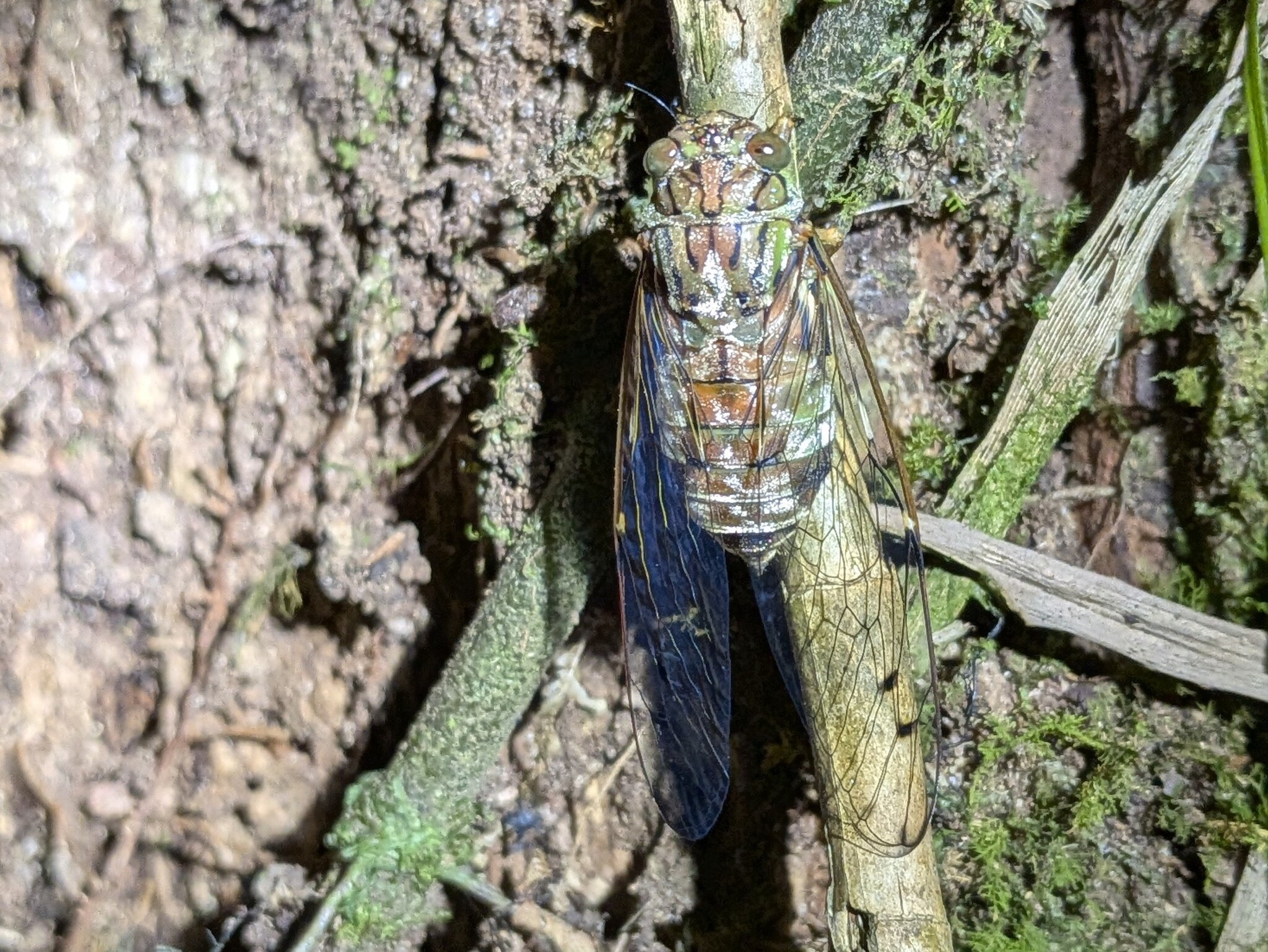
- Nabalua sumatrana

Scientific classification
- Kingdom: Animalia
- Phylum: Arthropoda
- Clade: Pancrustacea
- Class: Insecta
- Order: Hemiptera
- Suborder: Auchenorrhyncha
- Family: Cicadidae
- Subfamily: Cicadinae
- Tribe: Leptopsaltriini
- Subtribe: Leptopsaltriina
- Genus: Nabalua; Moulton, 1923

Species
- See text

= Nabalua =

Genus of true bugs

Nabalua is a genus of cicadas from Southeast Asia.

== List of species ==
- Nabalua borneensis Duffels, 2004
- Nabalua maculata Duffels, 2004
- Nabalua mascula (Distant, 1889)
- Nabalua neglecta Moulton, 1923
- Nabalua sumatrana Duffels, 2004
- Nabalua zaidii Duffels, 2004
