= Rustia (cicada) =

Scientific classification
- Kingdom: Animalia
- Phylum: Arthropoda
- Clade: Pancrustacea
- Class: Insecta
- Order: Hemiptera
- Suborder: Auchenorrhyncha
- Family: Cicadidae
- Subfamily: Cicadinae
- Tribe: Leptopsaltriini
- Genus: Rustia; Stål, 1866

Synonyms
- Gudaba Distant, 1906

Genus of true bugs

External image
- Images at iNaturalist

Rustia is a genus of Asian cicadas in the tribe Leptopsaltriini and has become the only genus in subtribe Gudabina; it was brought to monotypy by Carl Stål in 1866. Species have been recorded from India, China, Korea, Indochina, Malesia through to New Guinea.

== Species ==
The World Auchenorrhyncha Database includes:

1. Rustia apicata (Distant, 1906)
2. Rustia dentivitta (Walker, 1862) - type species by subsequent monotypy (as Rustia pedunculata Stål, 1866)
3. Rustia kodagura Marathe, Sanborn & Kunte, 2018
4. Rustia longicauda (Lei, 1996)
5. Rustia maculata (Distant, 1912)
6. Rustia marginata (Distant, 1897)
7. Rustia minuta Marathe, Sanborn & Kunte, 2018
8. Rustia tigrina (Distant, 1888)
