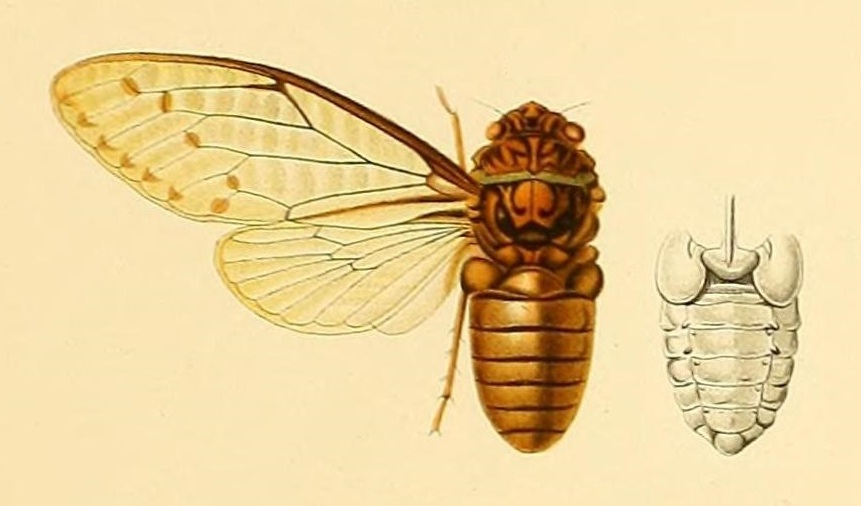
- Leptopsaltria tuberosa, male

Scientific classification
- Domain: Eukaryota
- Kingdom: Animalia
- Phylum: Arthropoda
- Class: Insecta
- Order: Hemiptera
- Suborder: Auchenorrhyncha
- Family: Cicadidae
- Subfamily: Cicadinae
- Tribe: Leptopsaltriini
- Genus: Leptopsaltria; Stål, 1866

Species
- See text.

= Leptopsaltria =

Genus of cicadas

Leptopsaltria is a genus of cicadas from Southeast Asia and typical of the tribe Leptopsaltriini.

== List of species ==
1. Leptopsaltria andamanensis Distant, 1888
2. Leptopsaltria phra Distant, 1913
3. Leptopsaltria samia Walker, F., 1850
4. Leptopsaltria tuberosa (Signoret, 1847) - type species (as Cicada tuberosa Signoret, 1847).
