= Terpnosia =

Scientific classification
- Kingdom: Animalia
- Phylum: Arthropoda
- Clade: Pancrustacea
- Class: Insecta
- Order: Hemiptera
- Suborder: Auchenorrhyncha
- Family: Cicadidae
- Tribe: Leptopsaltriini
- Subtribe: Leptopsaltriina
- Genus: Terpnosia; Distant, 1892

Synonyms
- Ierpnosia, Ternopsia Distant, 1892 and other orthographic variants

Genus of cicadas

External image
- Images at iNaturalist

Terpnosia is a genus of Asian cicadas in the tribe Leptopsaltriini (subtribe Leptopsaltriina), erected by William Lucas Distant in 1892; he named it from the Greek: τερπνός (pleasant) and the suffix -ία. Species distribution records include: India, Sri Lanka, China, Japan, Indochina, Malesia through to New Guinea.

== Species ==
The World Auchenorrhyncha Database includes:

1. Terpnosia chapana Distant, 1917
2. Terpnosia collina (Distant, 1888)
3. Terpnosia confusa Distant, 1905
4. Terpnosia elegans (Kirby, 1891)
5. Terpnosia ganesa Distant, 1904
6. Terpnosia graecina (Distant, 1889)
7. Terpnosia jenkinsi Distant, 1912
8. Terpnosia jinpingensis Lei & Chou, 1997
9. Terpnosia lactea (Distant, 1887)
10. Terpnosia lamrii Sulaiman, 2023
11. Terpnosia maculipes (Walker, 1850)
12. Terpnosia mawi Distant, 1909
13. Terpnosia mesonotalis Distant, 1917
14. Terpnosia neocollina Liu, 1940
15. Terpnosia nigella Chou & Lei, 1997
16. Terpnosia obscurana Metcalf, 1955
17. Terpnosia posidonia Jacobi, 1902
18. Terpnosia psecas (Walker, 1850) - type species (as Dundubia psecas Walker, 1850)
19. Terpnosia pumila (Distant, 1891)
20. Terpnosia puriticis Lei & Chou, 1997
21. Terpnosia ransonneti (Distant, 1888)
22. Terpnosia renschi Jacobi, 1941
23. Terpnosia ridens Pringle, 1955
24. Terpnosia rustica Distant, 1917
25. Terpnosia similis (Schmidt, 1924) (2 subspecies)
26. Terpnosia simusa (Boulard, 2008)
27. Terpnosia stipata (Walker, 1850)
28. Terpnosia translucida (Distant, 1891)
29. Terpnosia viridissima Boulard, 2005

Note: T. nigricosta is the type species Yezoterpnosia nigricosta (Motschulsky, 1866); the genus also contains Y. vacua, previously placed here.
