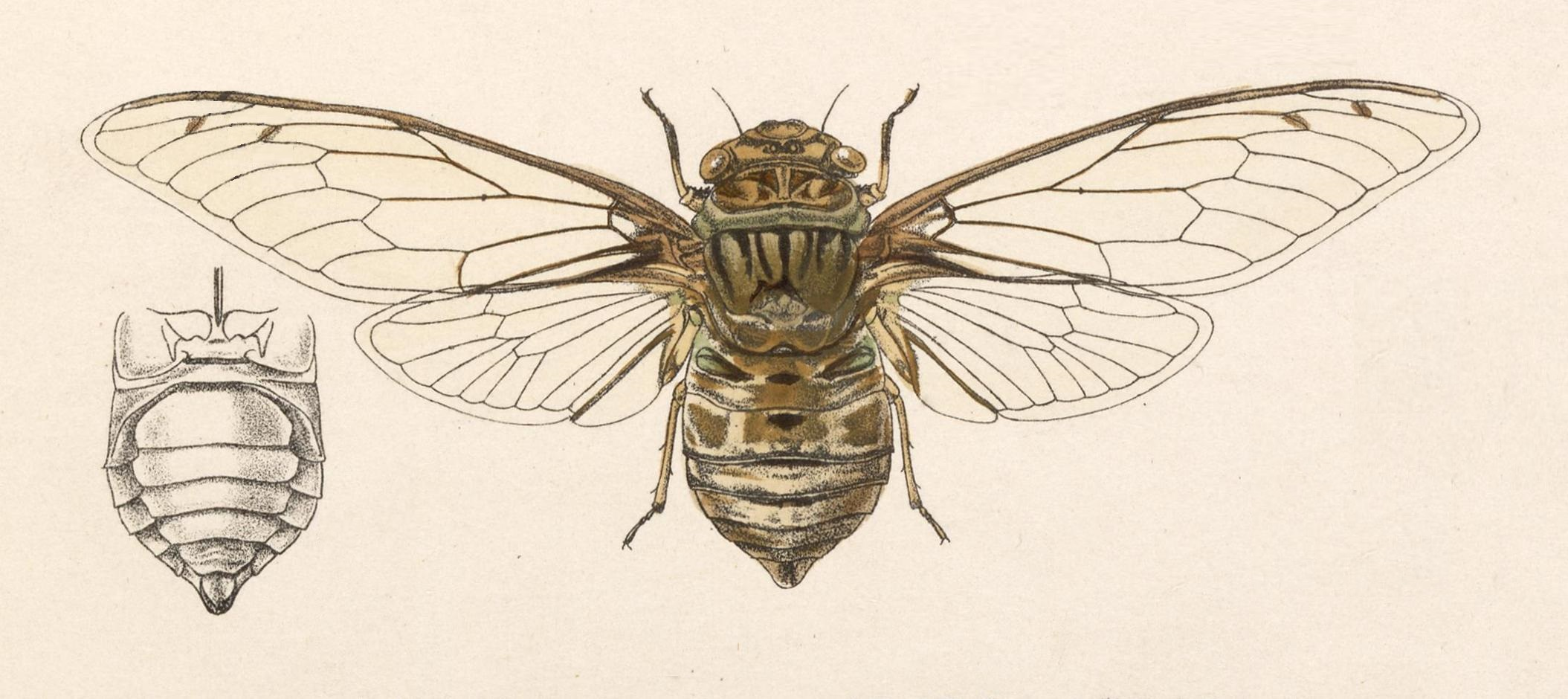
- Male Quesada gigas
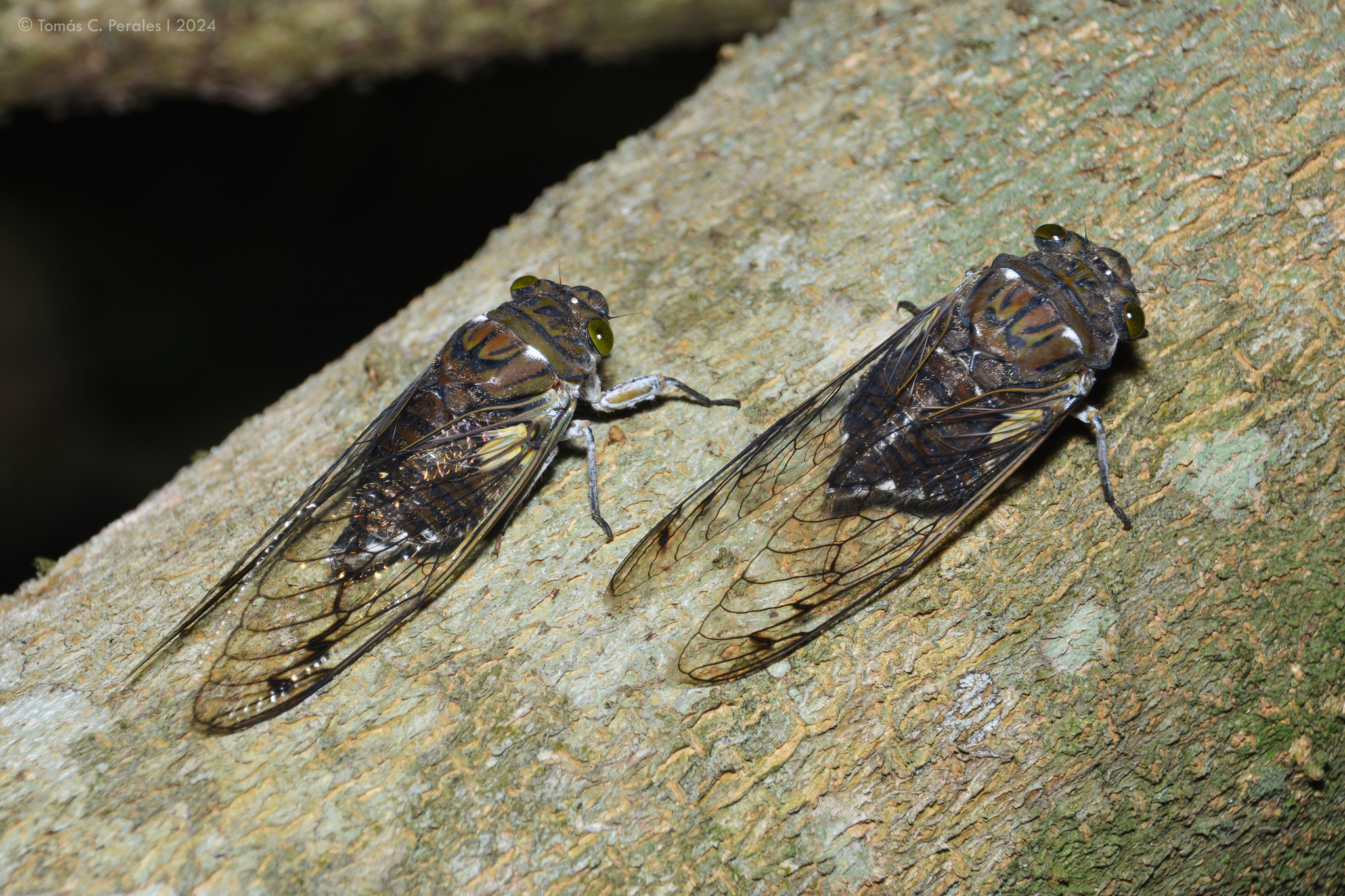
- On a tree

Scientific classification
- Kingdom: Animalia
- Phylum: Arthropoda
- Clade: Pancrustacea
- Class: Insecta
- Order: Hemiptera
- Suborder: Auchenorrhyncha
- Family: Cicadidae
- Tribe: Fidicinini
- Subtribe: Guyalnina
- Genus: Quesada
- Species: Q. gigas

Binomial name
- Quesada gigas Olivier 1790

= Giant cicada =

Species of true bug

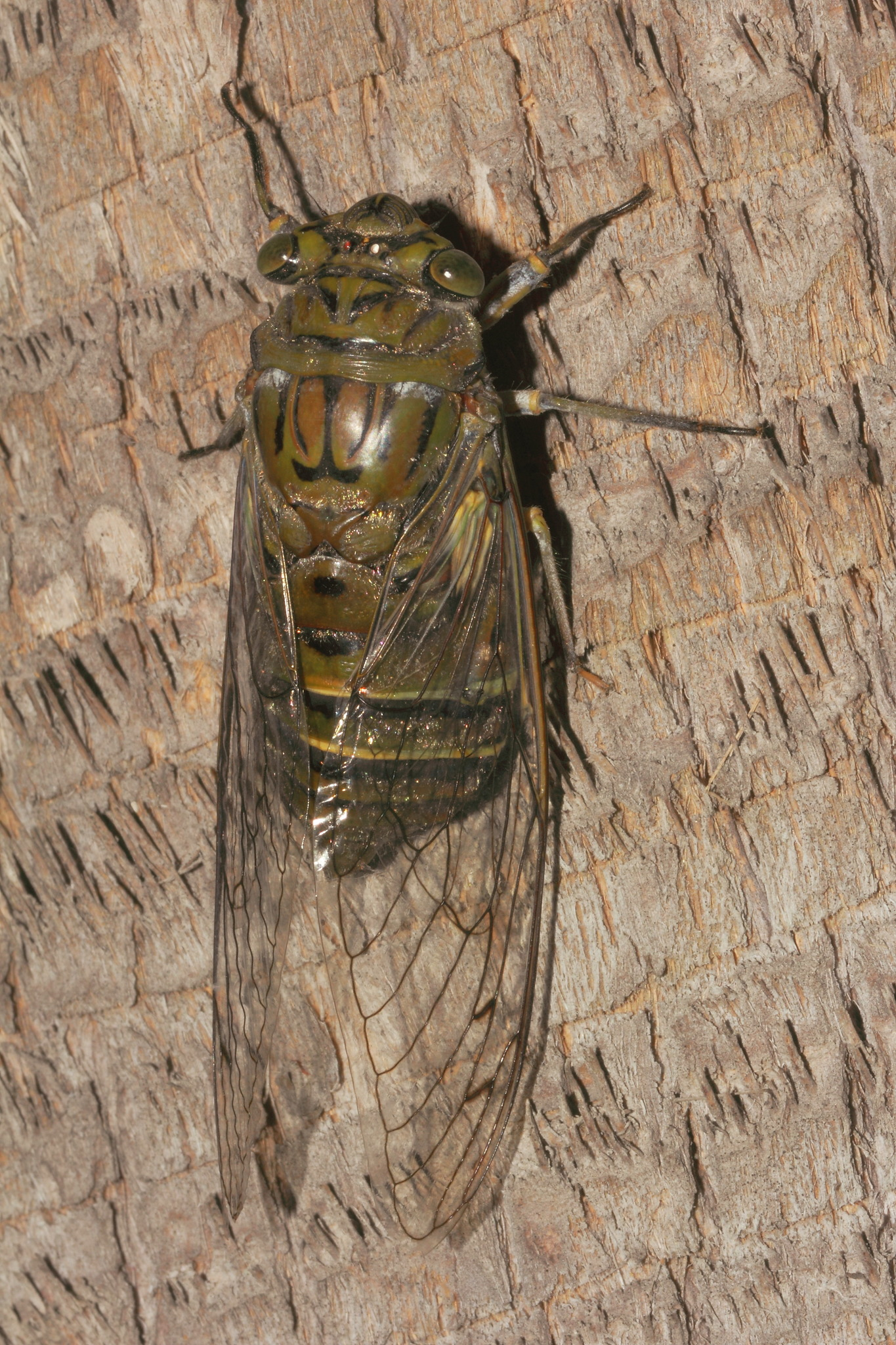
Quesada gigas, Giant Cicada, México

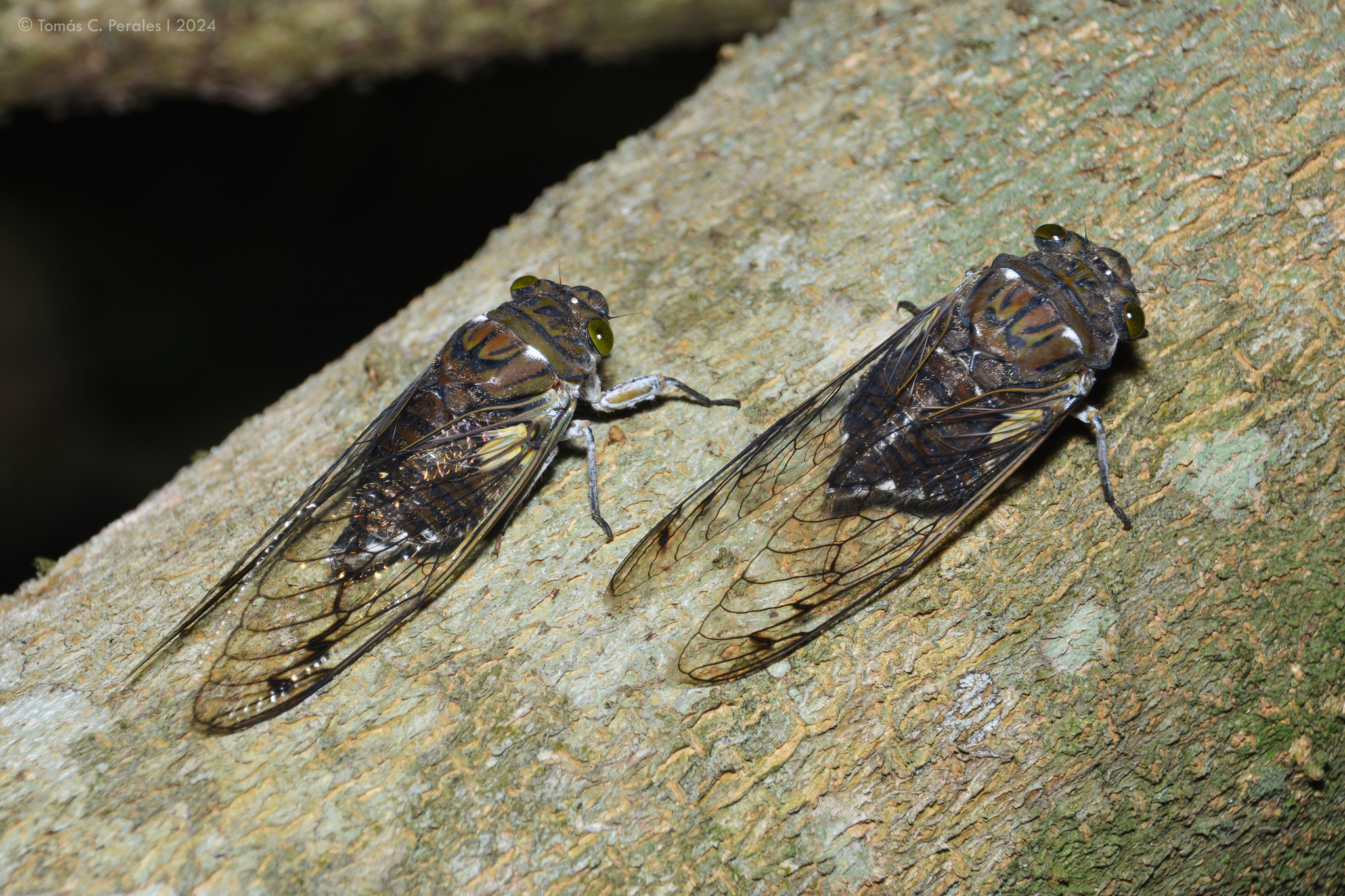
Quesada gigas, Giant Cicada, Argentina

The giant cicada (Quesada gigas), also known as the chichara grande, coyoyo, or coyuyo, is a species of large cicada native to North, Central, and South America. One of two species in the genus Quesada, it is the widest ranging cicada in the Western Hemisphere.

== History ==
The giant cicada was discovered by Guillaume-Antoine Olivier in 1790. British naturalist Henry Walter Bates described the shrill songs of the cicadas during his exploration in the Amazon in the late 1840s. There are historical records of the cicada in Bexar County, Texas starting in 1934, but this population died out - possibly due to the extended drought of the 1950s. Since 2005, the cicada population has grown and become widespread in central Texas. It currently ranges from central Texas to as far south as Mina Clavero, Argentina.

== Description ==
The giant cicada is one of the largest cicada species in North America. Like other Texan species, the giant cicada has an appearance that helps it camouflage into the environment. These true bugs are usually a combination of black, green and brown patterns, with brown to olive eyes and a brownish-green pronotal collar color. Texan cicadas distinguish themselves by sound, rather than appearance.

== Distribution and habitat ==
The giant cicada is the only species of the genus Quesada found in North America. The species feeds off of a wide variety of plant families. As an endothermic species, it has the ability to live in a wide range of environments. In the United States, the giant cicada primarily resides in the South Texas brushland, in an area spanning approximately from Laughlin Air Force Base (near Del Rio, Texas) in the west through Uvalde, San Antonio and Austin in the east, ranging nearly to the western limits of Houston. There have been sightings near cities such as Bellville, Brenham, Chappell Hill and Hempstead, Texas. Further south, its range includes most of the southern half of Texas before entering into Mexico, where it is primarily found from Coahuila, along the Mexican Gulf coast states, through to the Yucatán Peninsula. The species' range typically does not extend inland or far to the west until San Luis Potosí. In the west of Mexico, its range begins just north of Mazatlán and continues southward, along the coast, and inland through Guadalajara, Mexico City and all regions further south.

South of Mexico, the giant cicada is found across much of Belize, El Salvador, Guatemala, Honduras, Nicaragua, Costa Rica, Panama, Brazil, Colombia, Ecuador, Venezuela, the Guianas, Trinidad and Tobago, Bolivia, Peru, Paraguay and Uruguay. In Argentina, the species' range stretches as far south as Buenos Aires and Córdoba and as far west as San Juan and San Luis Provinces.

== Song ==
Giant cicadas produce a remarkably distinct and loud sound, singing primarily at dusk, and less often at dawn in central Texas. It has been known to sing all day and occasionally through the night further south. Its loud, shrill song has been described as a siren or alarm, a whistle, or gas escaping a pressure release valve. Although the giant cicada resides over a large area of land, there is almost no variation in its song throughout its range.

== Life cycle ==
Immature giant cicadas spend at least four years underground before emerging as adults. The cicadas feed on tree roots, typically Huisache or other members of the legume family. They usually emerge between April and October in south Texas, and from June to July in central Texas.
