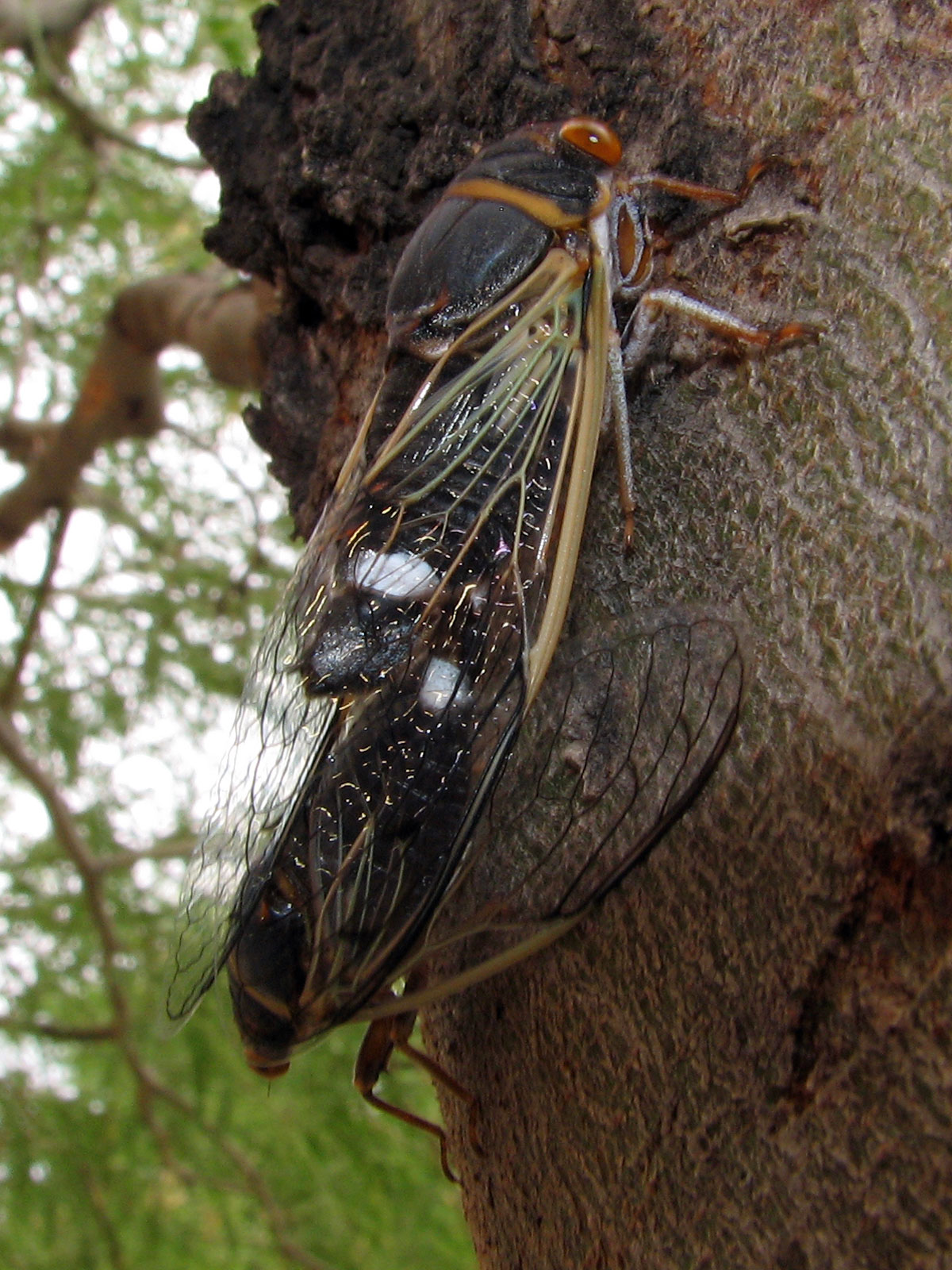

Scientific classification
- Domain: Eukaryota
- Kingdom: Animalia
- Phylum: Arthropoda
- Class: Insecta
- Order: Hemiptera
- Suborder: Auchenorrhyncha
- Family: Cicadidae
- Tribe: Fidicinini
- Genus: Diceroprocta
- Species: D. semicincta

Binomial name
- Diceroprocta semicincta (Davis, 1925)

= Diceroprocta semicincta =

Species of true bug

Diceroprocta semicincta is a species of cicada in the family Cicadidae. It is found in Central America and North America.

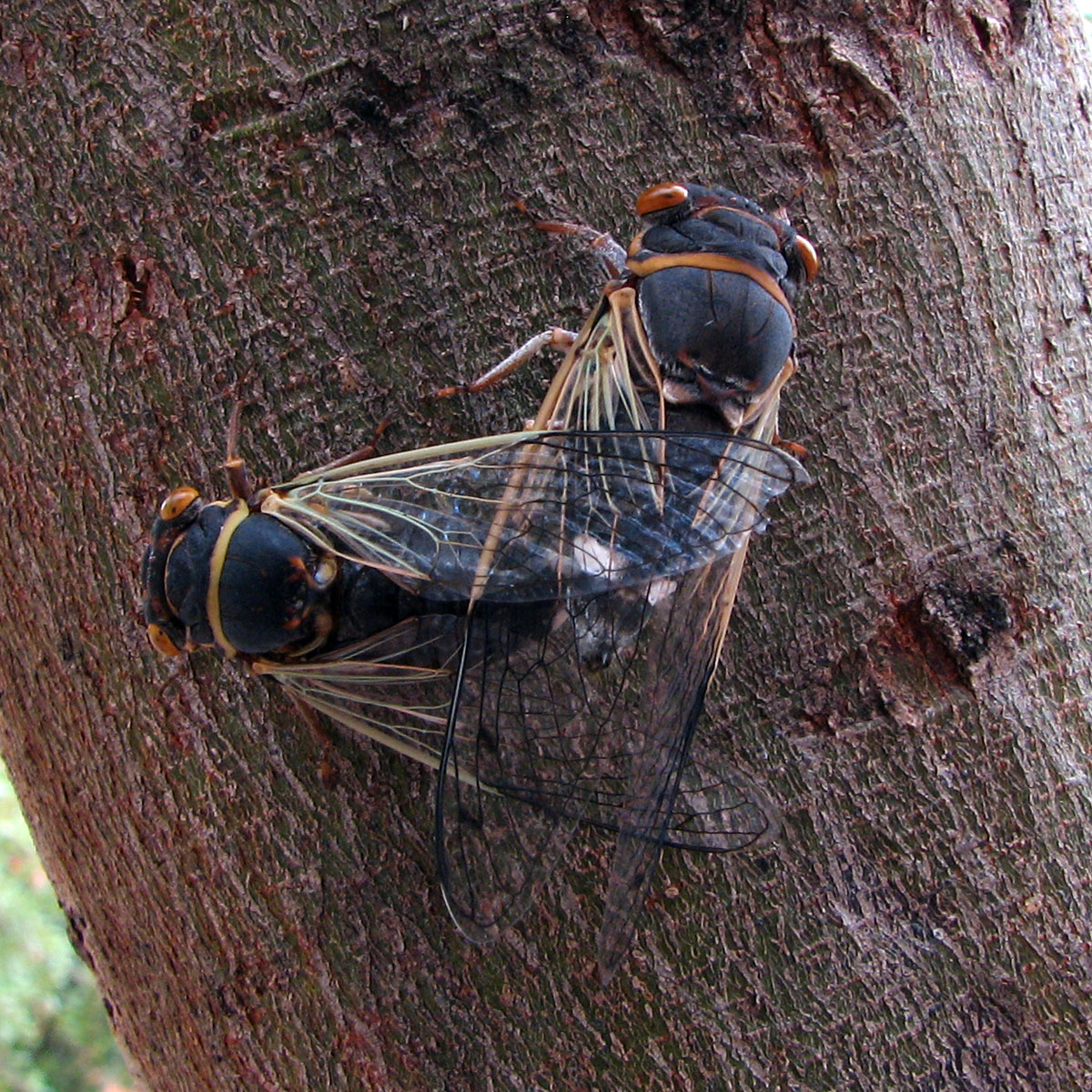

== Subspecies ==
These two subspecies belong to the species Diceroprocta semicincta:

- Diceroprocta semicincta nigricans Davis, 1942
- Diceroprocta semicincta semicincta (Davis, 1925)
