= Diceroprocta bequaerti =

Scientific classification
- Domain: Eukaryota
- Kingdom: Animalia
- Phylum: Arthropoda
- Class: Insecta
- Order: Hemiptera
- Suborder: Auchenorrhyncha
- Family: Cicadidae
- Tribe: Fidicinini
- Genus: Diceroprocta
- Species: D. bequaerti

Binomial name
- Diceroprocta bequaerti (Davis, 1917)

Species of true bug

Diceroprocta bequaerti is a species of cicada in the family Cicadidae. It is found in North America.
