= Guyalna =

Scientific classification
- Kingdom: Animalia
- Phylum: Arthropoda
- Clade: Pancrustacea
- Class: Insecta
- Order: Hemiptera
- Suborder: Auchenorrhyncha
- Family: Cicadidae
- Subfamily: Cicadinae
- Tribe: Fidicinini
- Subtribe: Guyalnina
- Genus: Guyalna; Boulard & Martinelli, 1996

Genus of true bugs

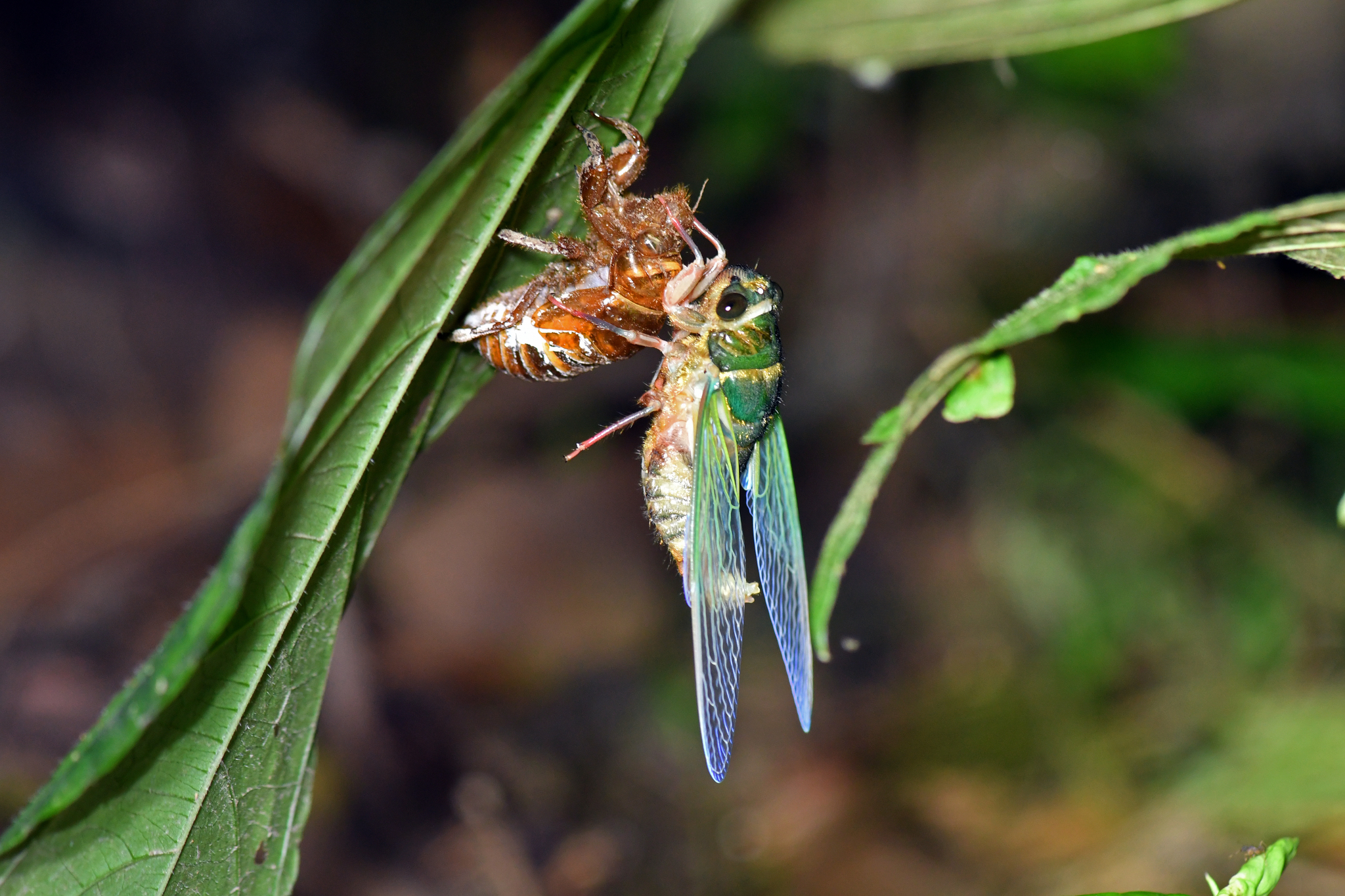
Photo of a bicolor Guyalna.

Guyalna is a genus of cicadas in the family Cicadidae. It was first described by Boulard and Martinelli in 1996. Members of this genus are characterized by three-segmented tarsi, a rounded timbal cover apex, a pronotum shorter than the mesonotum, the head as wide or slightly wider than the mesonotum, and slightly protruding eyes, according to the authors who first described it.

== List of species ==
This genus comprises 25 species.

- Guyalna atalapae Boulard & Martinelli, 2011
- Guyalna bicolor Olivier, 1790
- Guyalna bleuzeni Boulard & Martinelli, 2011
- Guyalna bogotana Distant, 1892
- Guyalna bonaerensis Berg, 1879
- Guyalna brisa Walker, 1850
- Guyalna chlorogena Walker, 1850
- Guyalna coffea Sanborn, Moore & Young, 2008
- Guyalna cuta Walker, 1850
- Guyalna distanti Goding, 1925
- Guyalna flavipronotum Sanborn, 2007
- Guyalna glauca Goding, 1925
- Guyalna jamesi Sanborn, 2016
- Guyalna jauffreti Boulard & Martinelli, 2011
- Guyalna maxineae Sanborn, 2016
- Guyalna nadae Gogala, Šporar, Sanborn & Maccagnan, 2015
- Guyalna nigra Boulard, 1999
- Guyalna panamensis Davis, 1939
- Guyalna parvula Jacobi, 1904
- Guyalna platyrhina Sanborn & Heath, 2014
- Guyalna rufapicalis Boulard, 1998
- Guyalna sublaqueata Uhler, 1903
- Guyalna variegata Sanborn, 2005
- Guyalna viridifemur Walker, 1850
