= Diceroprocta azteca =

Scientific classification
- Domain: Eukaryota
- Kingdom: Animalia
- Phylum: Arthropoda
- Class: Insecta
- Order: Hemiptera
- Suborder: Auchenorrhyncha
- Family: Cicadidae
- Tribe: Fidicinini
- Genus: Diceroprocta
- Species: D. azteca

Binomial name
- Diceroprocta azteca (Kirkaldy, 1909)

Species of true bug

Diceroprocta azteca is a species of cicada in the family Cicadidae. It is found in Central America, North America, and South America.
