= Diceroprocta biconica =

Scientific classification
- Kingdom: Animalia
- Phylum: Arthropoda
- Class: Insecta
- Order: Hemiptera
- Suborder: Auchenorrhyncha
- Family: Cicadidae
- Tribe: Fidicinini
- Genus: Diceroprocta
- Species: D. biconica

Binomial name
- Diceroprocta biconica (Walker, 1850)

Species of true bug

Diceroprocta biconica, or the Key's cicada, is a species of cicada in the family Cicadidae. It is found in the Caribbean Sea and North America.
