= Diceroprocta cinctifera =

Scientific classification
- Domain: Eukaryota
- Kingdom: Animalia
- Phylum: Arthropoda
- Class: Insecta
- Order: Hemiptera
- Suborder: Auchenorrhyncha
- Family: Cicadidae
- Tribe: Fidicinini
- Genus: Diceroprocta
- Species: D. cinctifera

Binomial name
- Diceroprocta cinctifera (Uhler, 1892)

Species of true bug

Diceroprocta cinctifera is a species of cicada in the family Cicadidae. It is found in North America.

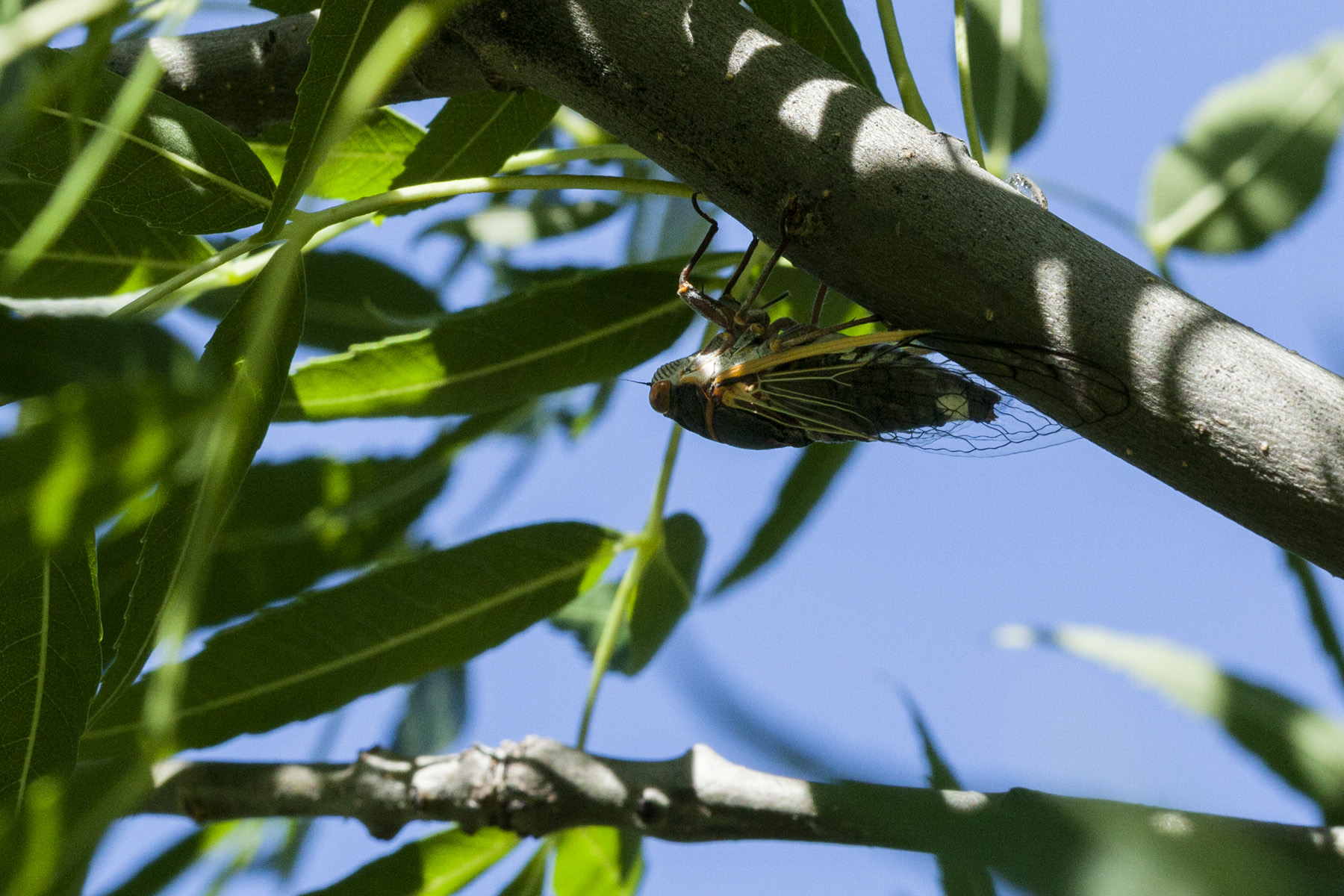
Diceroprocta cinctifera in Mesilla Park, NM.

== Subspecies ==
These three subspecies belong to the species Diceroprocta cinctifera:

- Diceroprocta cinctifera cinctifera (Uhler, 1892)
- Diceroprocta cinctifera limpia Davis, 1932
- Diceroprocta cinctifera viridicosta Davis, 1930
