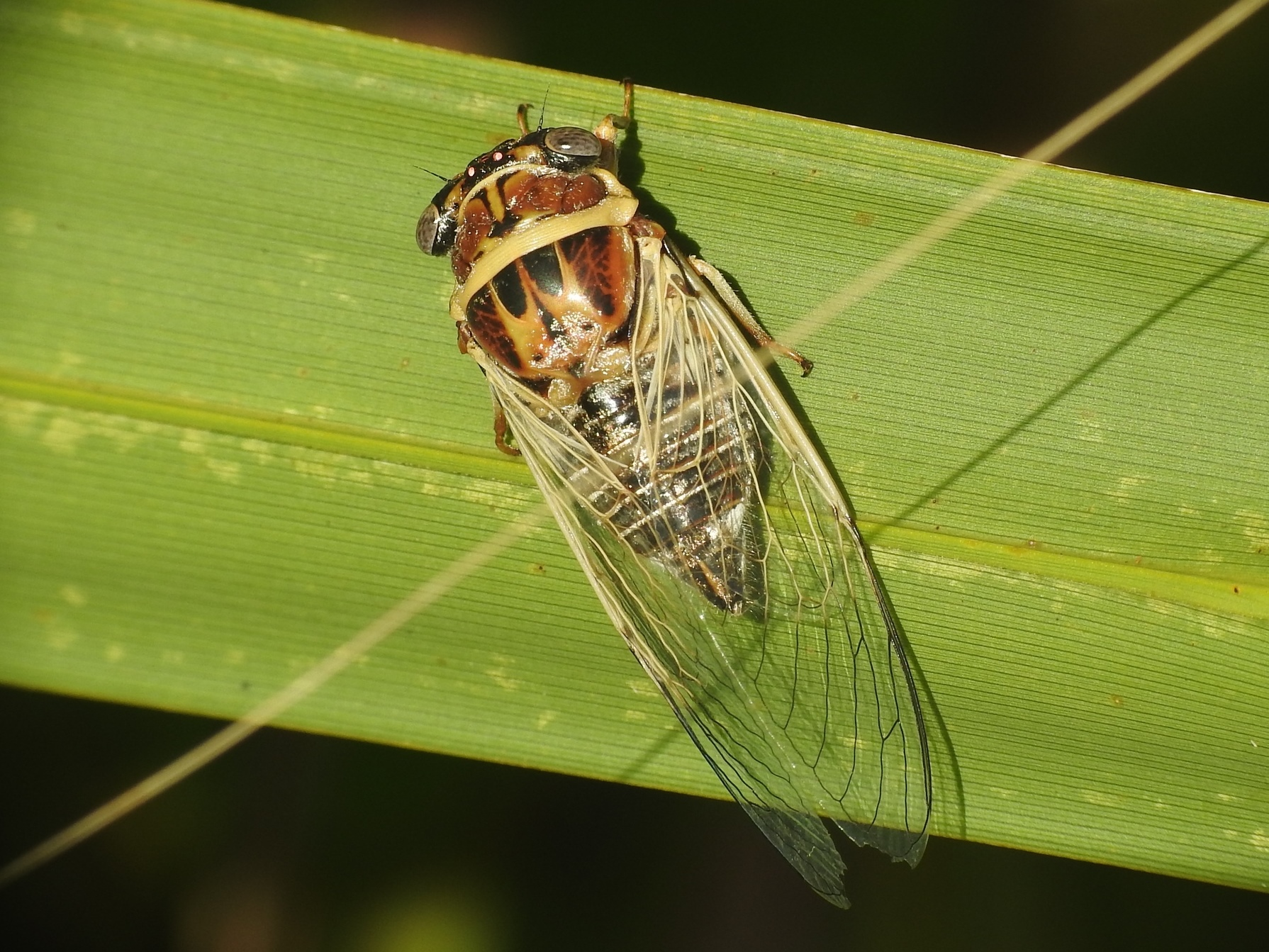

Scientific classification
- Kingdom: Animalia
- Phylum: Arthropoda
- Class: Insecta
- Order: Hemiptera
- Suborder: Auchenorrhyncha
- Family: Cicadidae
- Tribe: Fidicinini
- Genus: Diceroprocta
- Species: D. viridifascia

Binomial name
- Diceroprocta viridifascia (Walker, 1850)

= Diceroprocta viridifascia =

Species of true bug

Diceroprocta viridifascia, known generally as the salt marsh cicada or seaside cicada, is a species of cicada in the family Cicadidae. It is found in North America.
