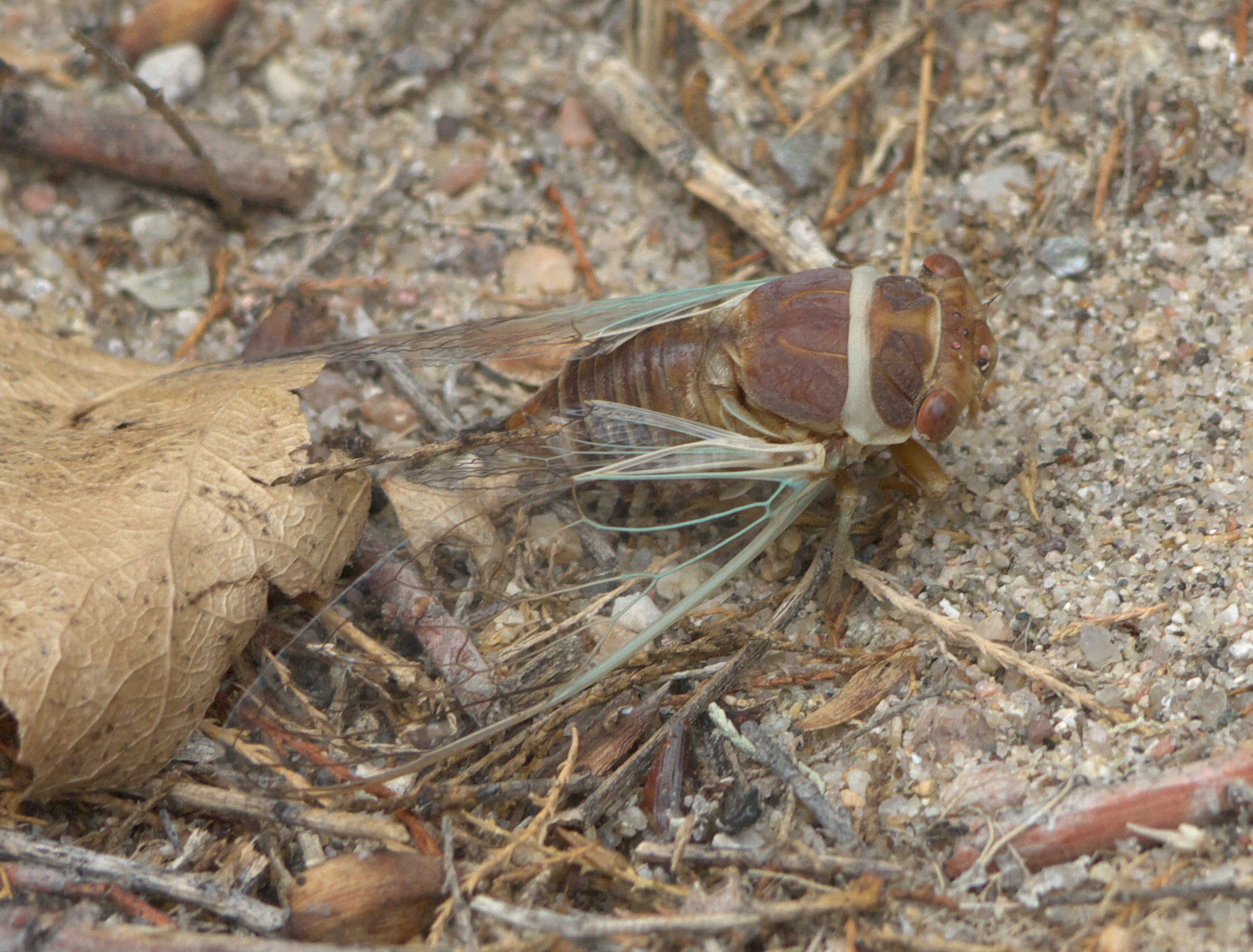

Scientific classification
- Kingdom: Animalia
- Phylum: Arthropoda
- Clade: Pancrustacea
- Class: Insecta
- Order: Hemiptera
- Suborder: Auchenorrhyncha
- Family: Cicadidae
- Tribe: Fidicinini
- Genus: Diceroprocta
- Species: D. apache

Binomial name
- Diceroprocta apache (Davis, 1921)

= Diceroprocta apache =

Species of true bug

Diceroprocta apache, the citrus cicada or Apache cicada, is a species of cicada in the family Cicadidae. It is found in southwestern North America.

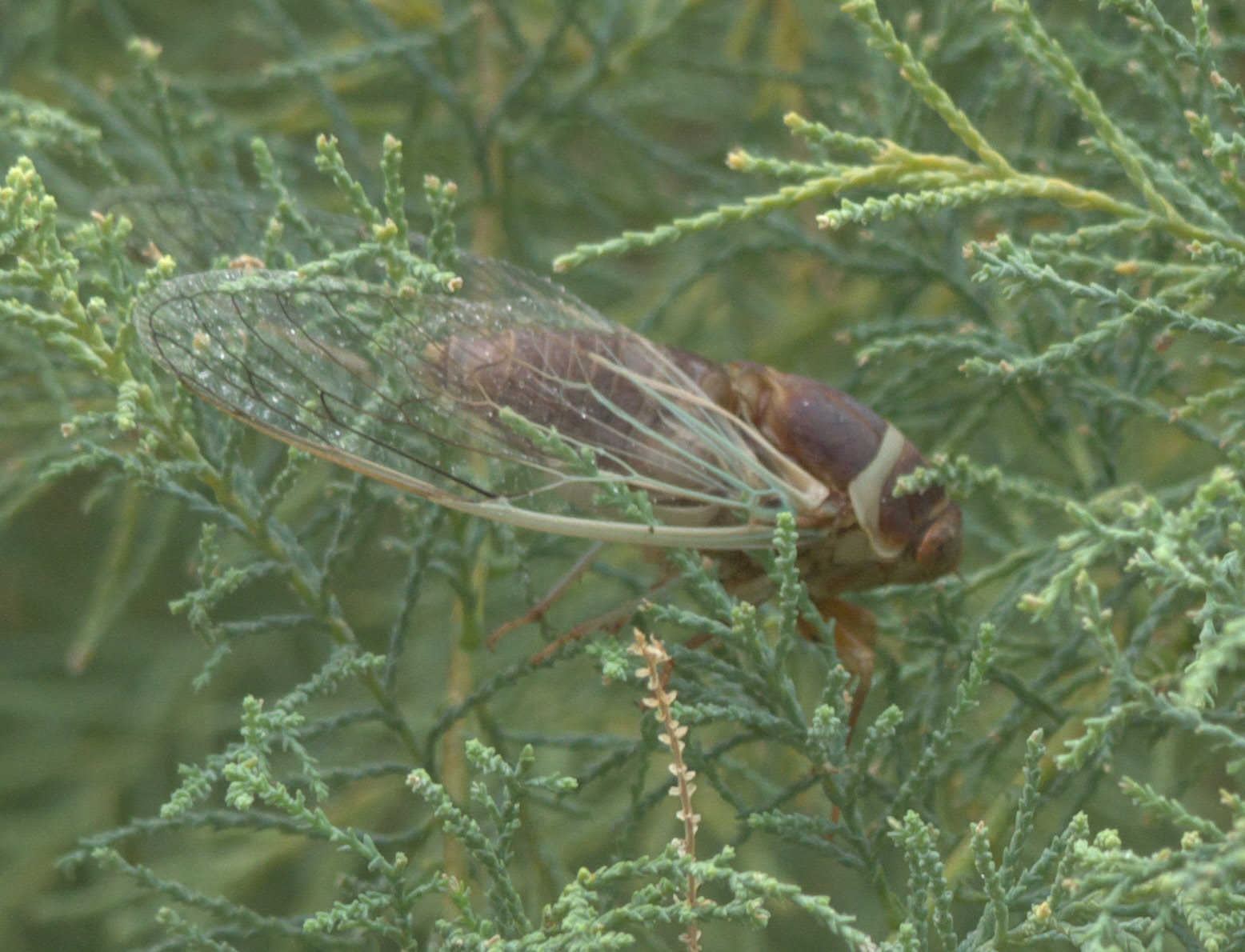
Citrus cicada, Diceroprocta apache

== Life cycle ==
Their median life cycle from egg to natural adult death is around three to four years.

== Ecology ==
The Apache cicada is an important link in riparian hydrology and food webs of desert regions.
