= Pacarina shoemakeri =

Scientific classification
- Kingdom: Animalia
- Phylum: Arthropoda
- Clade: Pancrustacea
- Class: Insecta
- Order: Hemiptera
- Suborder: Auchenorrhyncha
- Family: Cicadidae
- Subfamily: Cicadinae
- Genus: Pacarina
- Species: P. shoemakeri

Binomial name
- Pacarina shoemakeri Sanborn & M. Heath in Sanborn, M. Heath, Phillips & J. Heath, 2012

Species of true bug

Pacarina shoemakeri, the little juniper cicada, is a species of cicada in the family Cicadidae. It is found in North America. They are a recategorization of what was previously classified as the juniper variety of the Pacarina puella. In the United States, it can be found in the states of Arizona, Colorado, New Mexico, and Texas, in chaparral, intermountain woodlands, and elevated regions of the Chihuahua desert. They have also been found in Cimarron County, Oklahoma, and are associated with plants in the Juniperus genus. The species is named after Eugene Shoemaker.
