= Beameria venosa =

Scientific classification
- Domain: Eukaryota
- Kingdom: Animalia
- Phylum: Arthropoda
- Class: Insecta
- Order: Hemiptera
- Suborder: Auchenorrhyncha
- Family: Cicadidae
- Subfamily: Cicadinae
- Genus: Beameria
- Species: B. venosa

Binomial name
- Beameria venosa (Uhler, 1888)

Species of true bug

Beameria venosa is a species of cicada in the family Cicadidae. It is found in Central America and North America.
