= Diceroprocta swalei =

Scientific classification
- Domain: Eukaryota
- Kingdom: Animalia
- Phylum: Arthropoda
- Class: Insecta
- Order: Hemiptera
- Suborder: Auchenorrhyncha
- Family: Cicadidae
- Genus: Diceroprocta
- Species: D. swalei

Binomial name
- Diceroprocta swalei (Distant, 1904)

Species of true bug

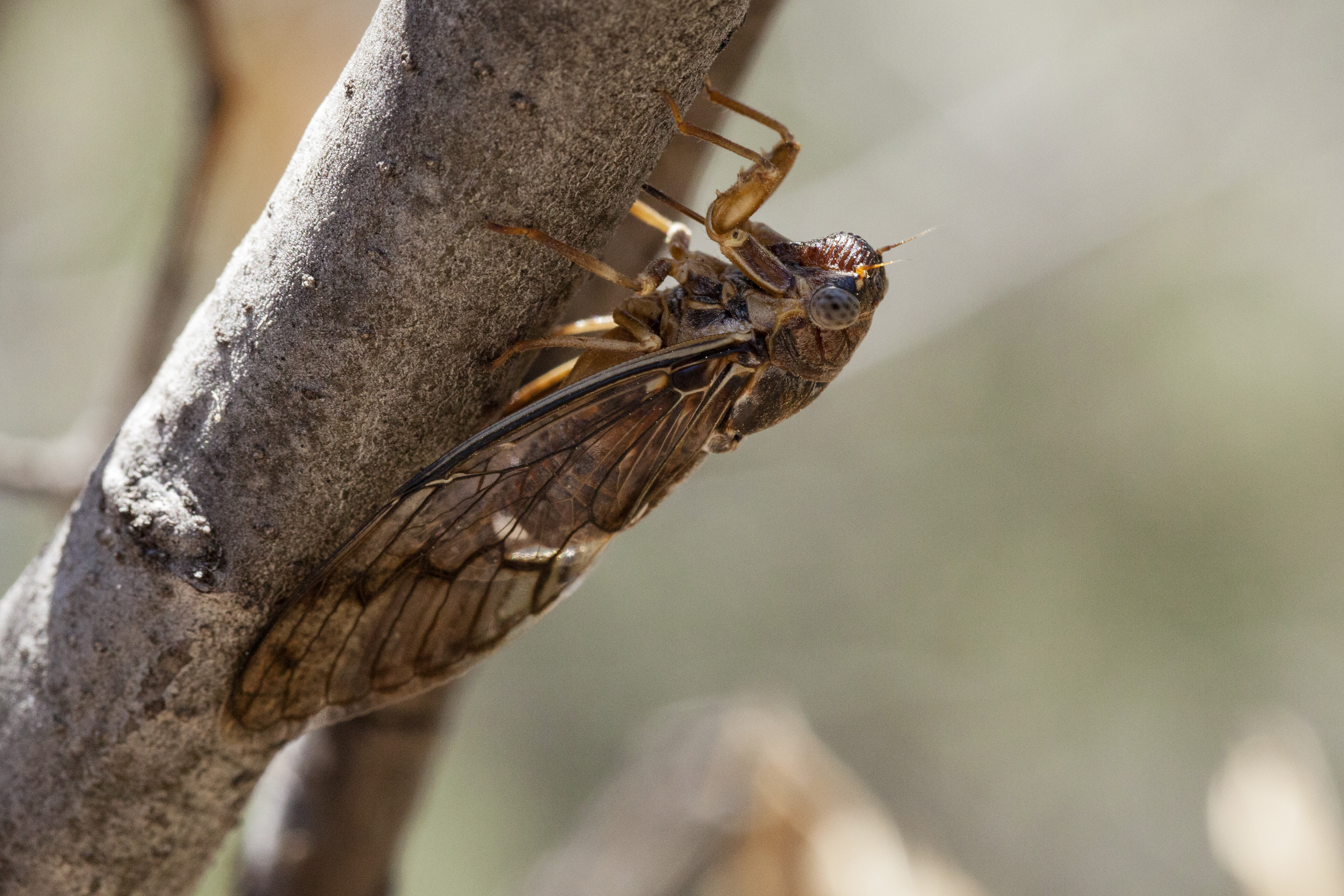
Diceroprocta swalei

Diceroprocta swalei is a species of cicada in the family Cicadidae. It is found in Central America and North America.

== Subspecies ==
These two subspecies belong to the species Diceroprocta swalei:

- Diceroprocta swalei davisi Metcalf, 1963
- Diceroprocta swalei swalei (Distant, 1904)
