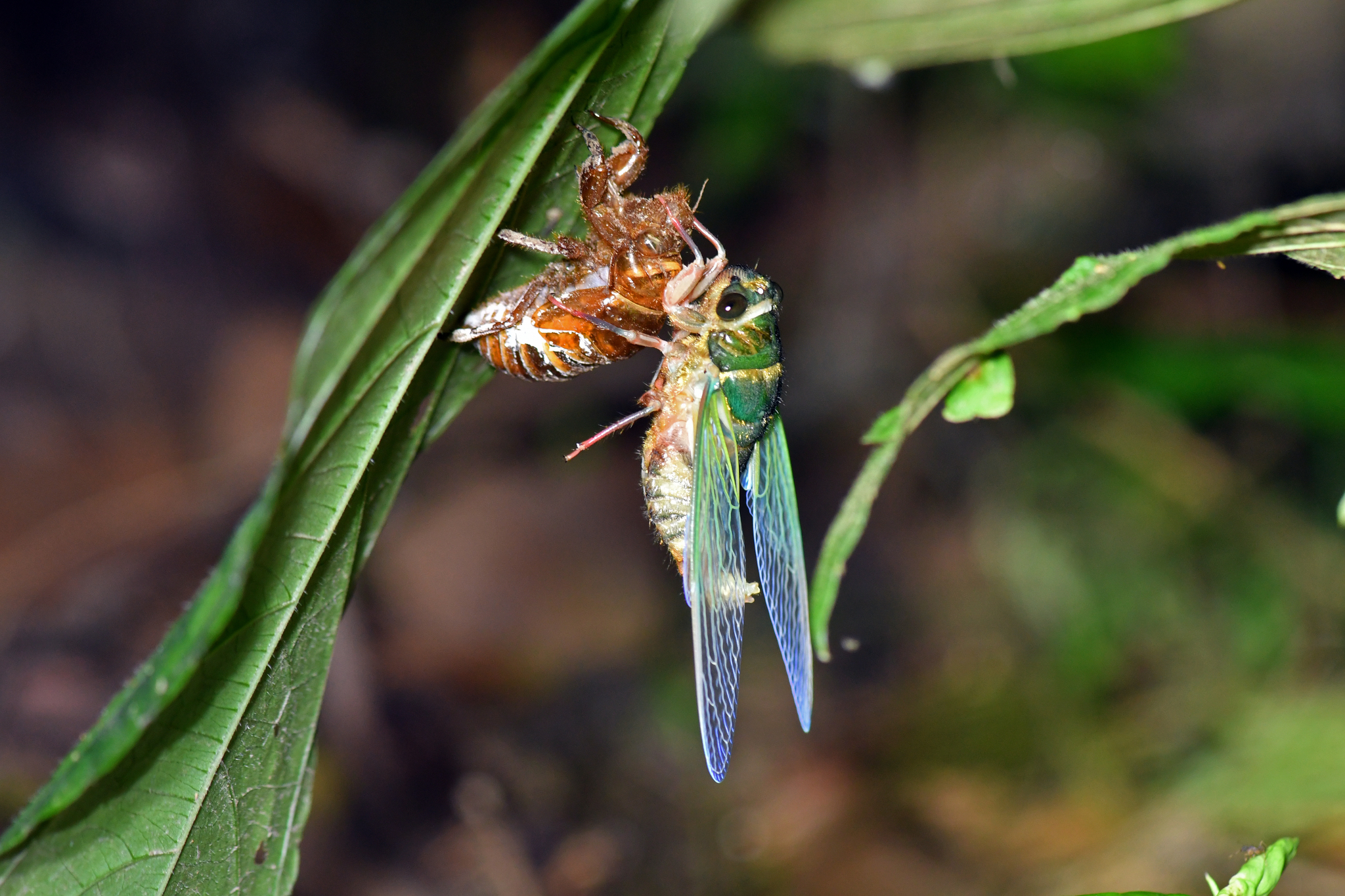
- Moulting adult; pictured in Costa Rica.

Scientific classification
- Kingdom: Animalia
- Phylum: Arthropoda
- Class: Insecta
- Order: Hemiptera
- Suborder: Auchenorrhyncha
- Family: Cicadidae
- Genus: Guyalna
- Species: G. bicolor

Binomial name
- Guyalna bicolor (Olivier, 1790)

Synonyms
- Cicada bicolor Olivier, 1790; Cicada passerculus Walker, 1850; Cicada spinicosta Walker, 1850; Cicada lacrines Walker, 1850; Fidicina bicolor Stål, 1866; Fidicina cayennensis Kirkaldy, 1909; Dorisiana bicolor Boulard, 1996

= Guyalna bicolor =

Species of cicada

Guyalna bicolor is a species of cicada found in Latin America.

== Description ==
Guillaume-Antoine Olivier provided an original description in 1790. The beginning of his French description read: "the body of this cicada is one inch long and almost three wide, when the wings are extended; it is of stocky shape, and the head is of a pale yellow colour." (Note: Le corps de cette Cigale a un pouce de longueur, & près de trois de largeur, lorsque les aîles sont étendues ; elle est d’une forme ramassée, la tête est d’un jaune pâle.)

== Distribution ==
Olivier described the species from Cayenne, French Guiana; today the species is understood to be found in French Guiana, Panama, Suriname, Nicaragua, Costa Rica, Brazil and Colombia.
