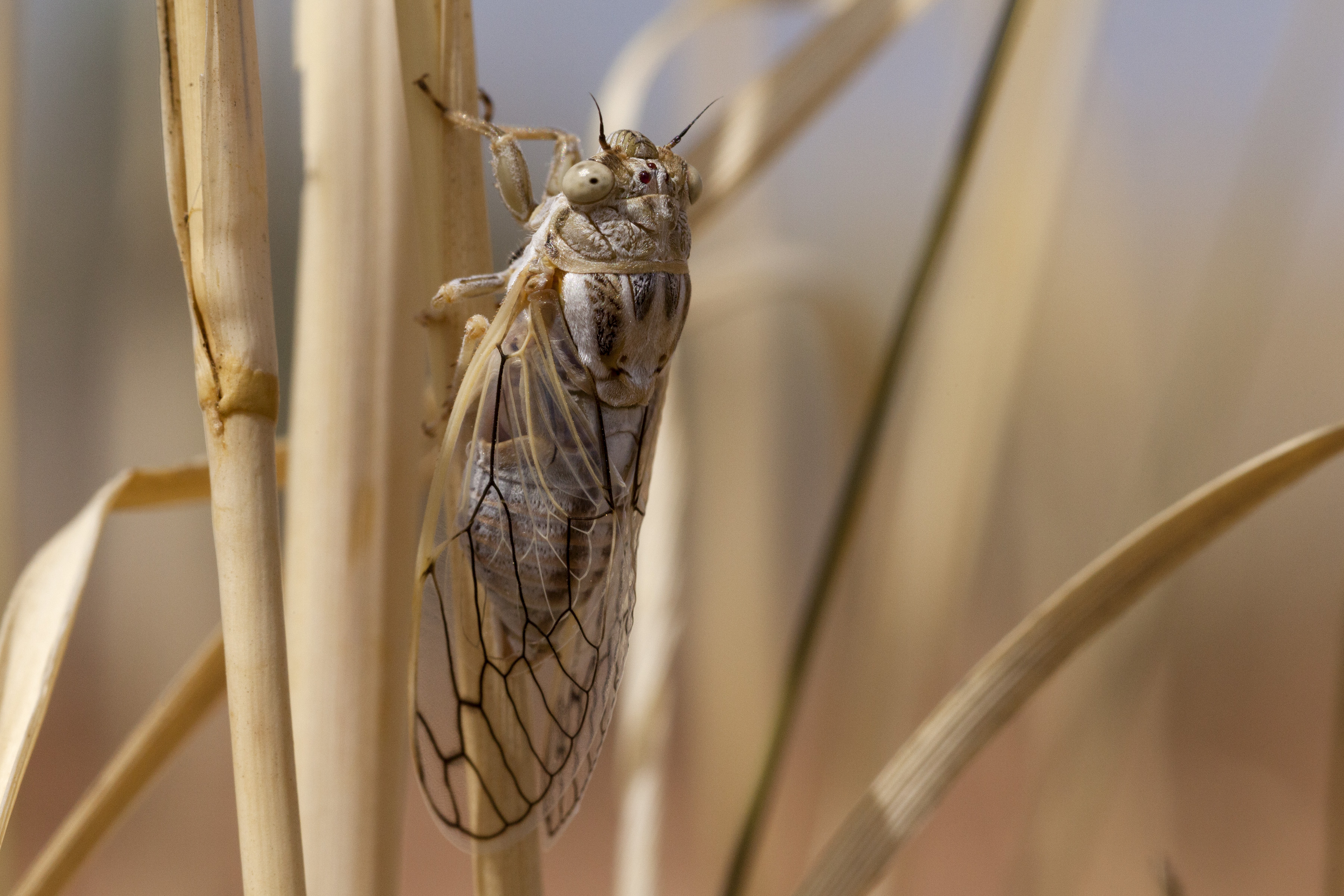
- Beameria wheeleri observed in New Mexico, 2017

Scientific classification
- Domain: Eukaryota
- Kingdom: Animalia
- Phylum: Arthropoda
- Class: Insecta
- Order: Hemiptera
- Suborder: Auchenorrhyncha
- Family: Cicadidae
- Genus: Beameria
- Species: B. wheeleri

Binomial name
- Beameria wheeleri Davis, 1934

= Beameria wheeleri =

Species of true bug

Beameria wheeleri is a species of cicada in the family Cicadidae. It is found in Central America and North America.
