= Diceroprocta vitripennis =

Scientific classification
- Domain: Eukaryota
- Kingdom: Animalia
- Phylum: Arthropoda
- Class: Insecta
- Order: Hemiptera
- Suborder: Auchenorrhyncha
- Family: Cicadidae
- Genus: Diceroprocta
- Species: D. vitripennis

Binomial name
- Diceroprocta vitripennis (Say, 1830)

Species of true bug

Diceroprocta vitripennis, known generally as the green winged cicada or green winged scrub cicada, is a species of cicada in the family Cicadidae. It is found in Central America and North America.
