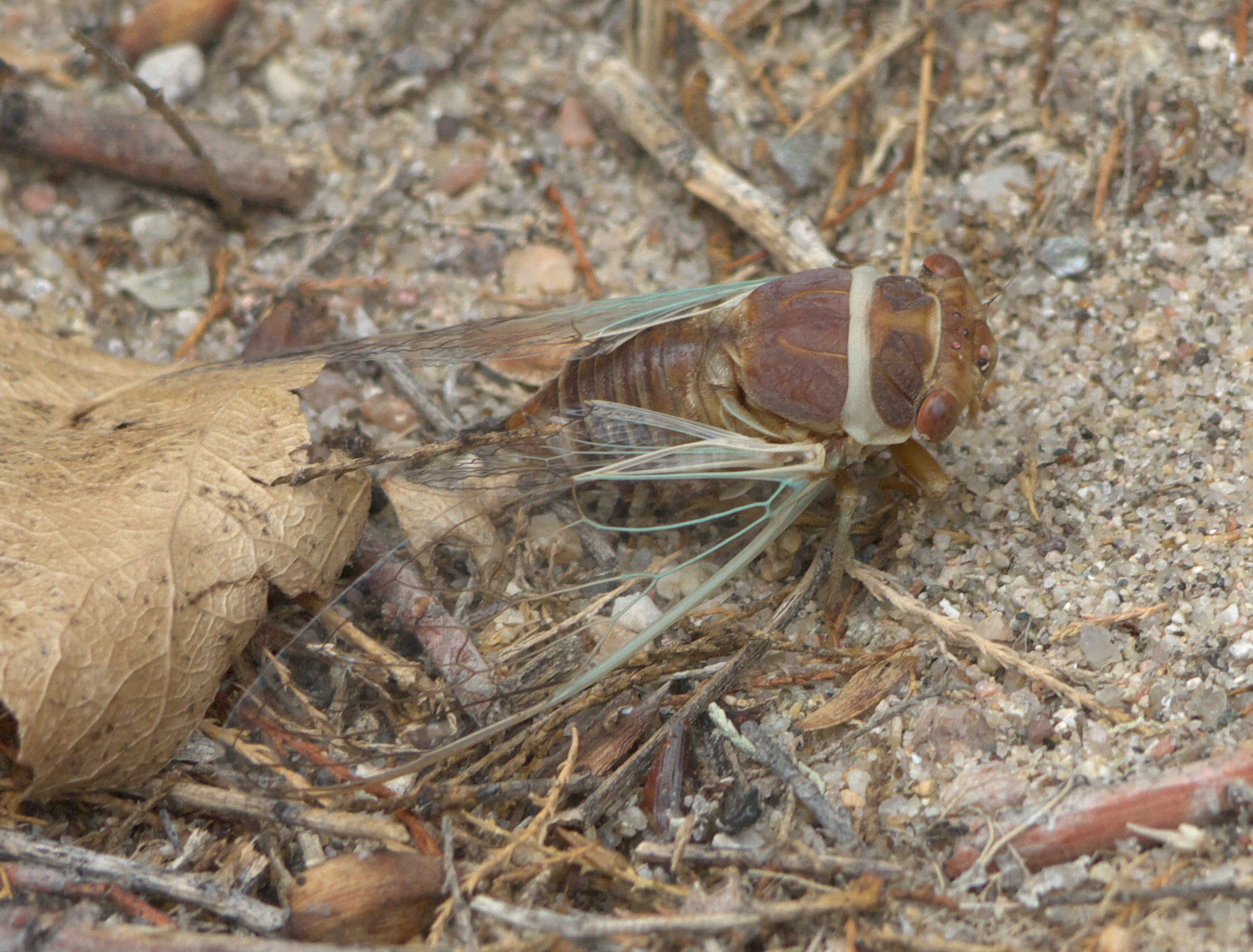
- Diceroprocta apache

Scientific classification
- Kingdom: Animalia
- Phylum: Arthropoda
- Clade: Pancrustacea
- Class: Insecta
- Order: Hemiptera
- Suborder: Auchenorrhyncha
- Family: Cicadidae
- Tribe: Fidicinini
- Genus: Diceroprocta; Stål, 1870

= Diceroprocta =

Genus of true bugs

Diceroprocta is a genus of scrub cicadas in the family Cicadidae. There are at least 60 described species in Diceroprocta.

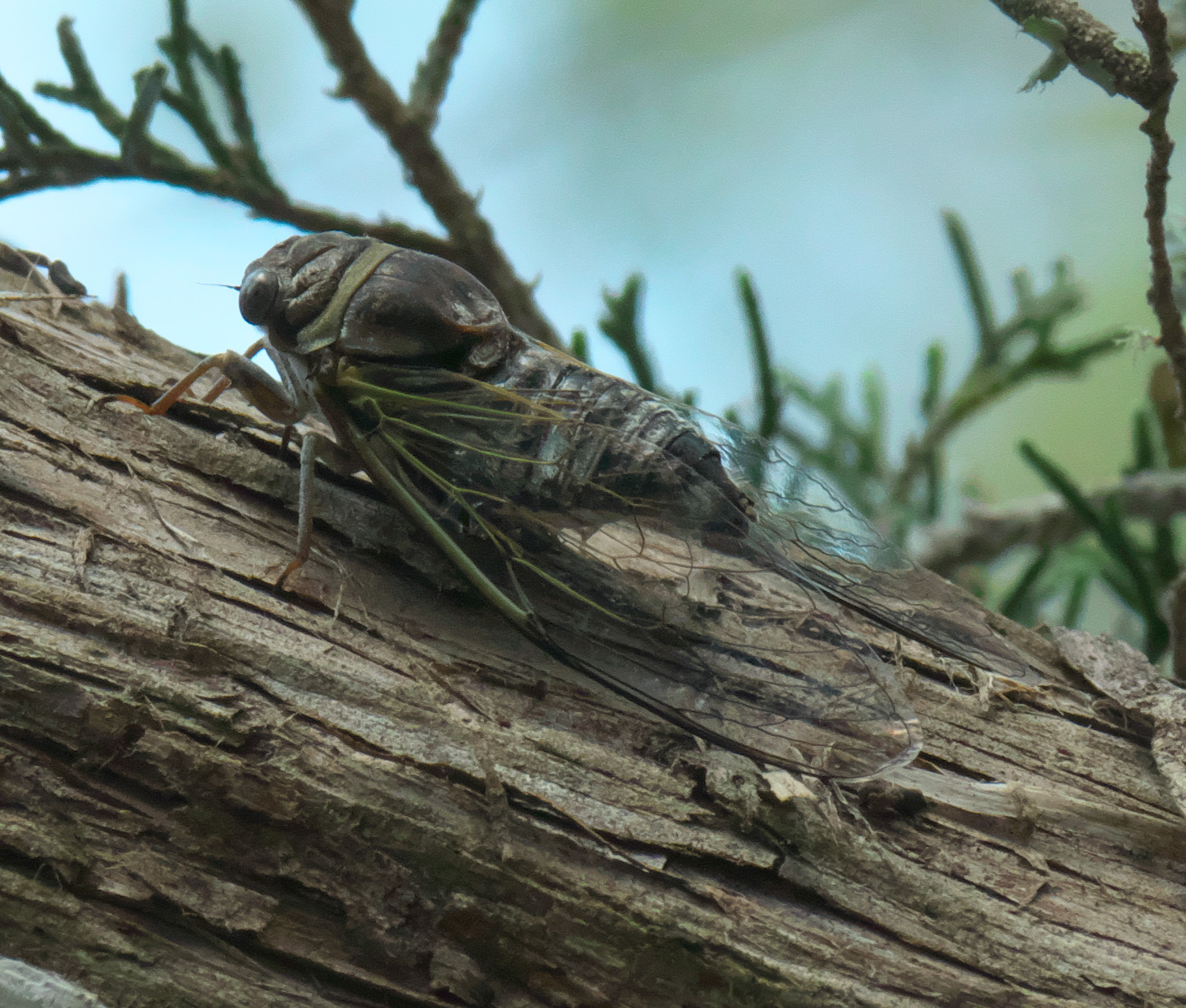
Diceroprocta viridifascia

== Species ==
These 60 species belong to the genus Diceroprocta:

- Diceroprocta alacris (Stål, 1864)^{i c g}
- Diceroprocta albomaculata Davis, 1928^{i c g}
- Diceroprocta apache (Davis, 1921)^{i c g b} (citrus cicada)
- Diceroprocta apache-cinctifera-semicincta^{b}
- Diceroprocta arizona (Davis, 1916)^{i c g b}
- Diceroprocta aurantiaca Davis, 1938^{i c g b}
- Diceroprocta averyi Davis, 1941^{i c g b}
- Diceroprocta azteca (Kirkaldy, 1909)^{i c g b}
- Diceroprocta bakeri (Distant, 1911)^{i c g}
- Diceroprocta belizensis (Distant, 1910)^{i c g}
- Diceroprocta bequaerti (Davis, 1917)^{i c g b}
- Diceroprocta bibbyi Davis, 1928^{i c g}
- Diceroprocta bicolora Davis, 1935^{i c g}
- Diceroprocta biconica (Walker, 1850)^{i c g b} (the Key's cicada)
- Diceroprocta bicosta (Walker, 1850)^{i c g}
- Diceroprocta bimaculata (Sanborn, 2010)^{c g}
- Diceroprocta bonhotei (Distant, 1901)^{i c g}
- Diceroprocta bulgara (Distant, 1906)^{i c g}
- Diceroprocta canescens Davis, 1935^{i c g}
- Diceroprocta castanea (Davis, W.T., 1916)^{c}
- Diceroprocta caymanensis Davis, 1939^{i c g}
- Diceroprocta cinctifera (Uhler, 1892)^{i c g b}
- Diceroprocta cleavesi Davis, 1930^{i c g}
- Diceroprocta crucifera (Walker, 1850)^{i c g}
- Diceroprocta delicata (Osborn, 1906)^{i c g b}
- Diceroprocta digueti (Distant, 1906)^{i c g}
- Diceroprocta distanti Metcalf, 1963^{i c g}
- Diceroprocta eugraphica (Davis, 1916)^{i c g b}
- Diceroprocta fraterna Davis, 1935^{i c g}
- Diceroprocta fusipennis (Walker, 1858)^{i c g}
- Diceroprocta grossa (Fabricius, 1775)^{i c g}
- Diceroprocta heathi (Sanborn, 2010)^{c g}
- Diceroprocta knighti (Davis, 1917)^{i c g b}
- Diceroprocta lata Davis, 1941^{i c g}
- Diceroprocta lucida Davis, 1934^{i c g}
- Diceroprocta marevagans Davis, 1928^{i c g b}
- Diceroprocta mesochlora (Walker, 1850)^{i c g}
- Diceroprocta nigriventris (Walker, F., 1858)^{c g}
- Diceroprocta oaxacaensis Sanborn, 2007^{i c g}
- Diceroprocta obscurior Davis, 1935^{i c g}
- Diceroprocta oculata Davis, 1935^{i c g}
- Diceroprocta oleacea (Distant, 1891)^{c g}
- Diceroprocta olympusa (Walker, 1850)^{i c g b}
- Diceroprocta operculabrunnea Davis, 1934^{i c g}
- Diceroprocta ornea (Walker, 1850)^{i c g}
- Diceroprocta ovata Davis, 1939^{i c g}
- Diceroprocta pinosensis Davis, 1935^{i c g}
- Diceroprocta pronotolinea Sanborn, 2007^{i c g}
- Diceroprocta psophis (Walker, 1850)^{i c g}
- Diceroprocta pusilla Davis, 1942^{i c g}
- Diceroprocta pygmaea (Fabricius, 1803)^{i c g}
- Diceroprocta ruatana (Distant, 1891)^{i c g}
- Diceroprocta semicincta (Davis, 1925)^{i c g b}
- Diceroprocta swalei (Distant, 1904)^{i c g b}
- Diceroprocta tepicana Davis, 1938^{i c g}
- Diceroprocta texana (Davis, 1916)^{i c g b}
- Diceroprocta tibicen (Linnaeus, 1758)^{i g}
- Diceroprocta virgulata (Distant, 1904)^{i c g}
- Diceroprocta viridifascia (Walker, 1850)^{i c g b} (salt marsh cicada)
- Diceroprocta vitripennis (Say, 1830)^{i c g b} (green winged cicada)

Data sources: i = ITIS, c = Catalogue of Life, g = GBIF, b = Bugguide.net

== History ==
The genus Diceroprocta appears to have originated in Mexico, as that is where the most genetic diversity can be found. Diceroprocta cicadas are most closely related to the Tibicen genus; many Diceroprocta insects were originally falsely assigned to the Tibicen genus.

== Biogeography ==
There are 21 Diceroprocta species that inhabit the United States and Canada. The subspecies can be separated into two primary categories: those in the central and eastern United States whose males possess rounded opercula, and those in the western and southern United States, whose males possess pointed opercula.
