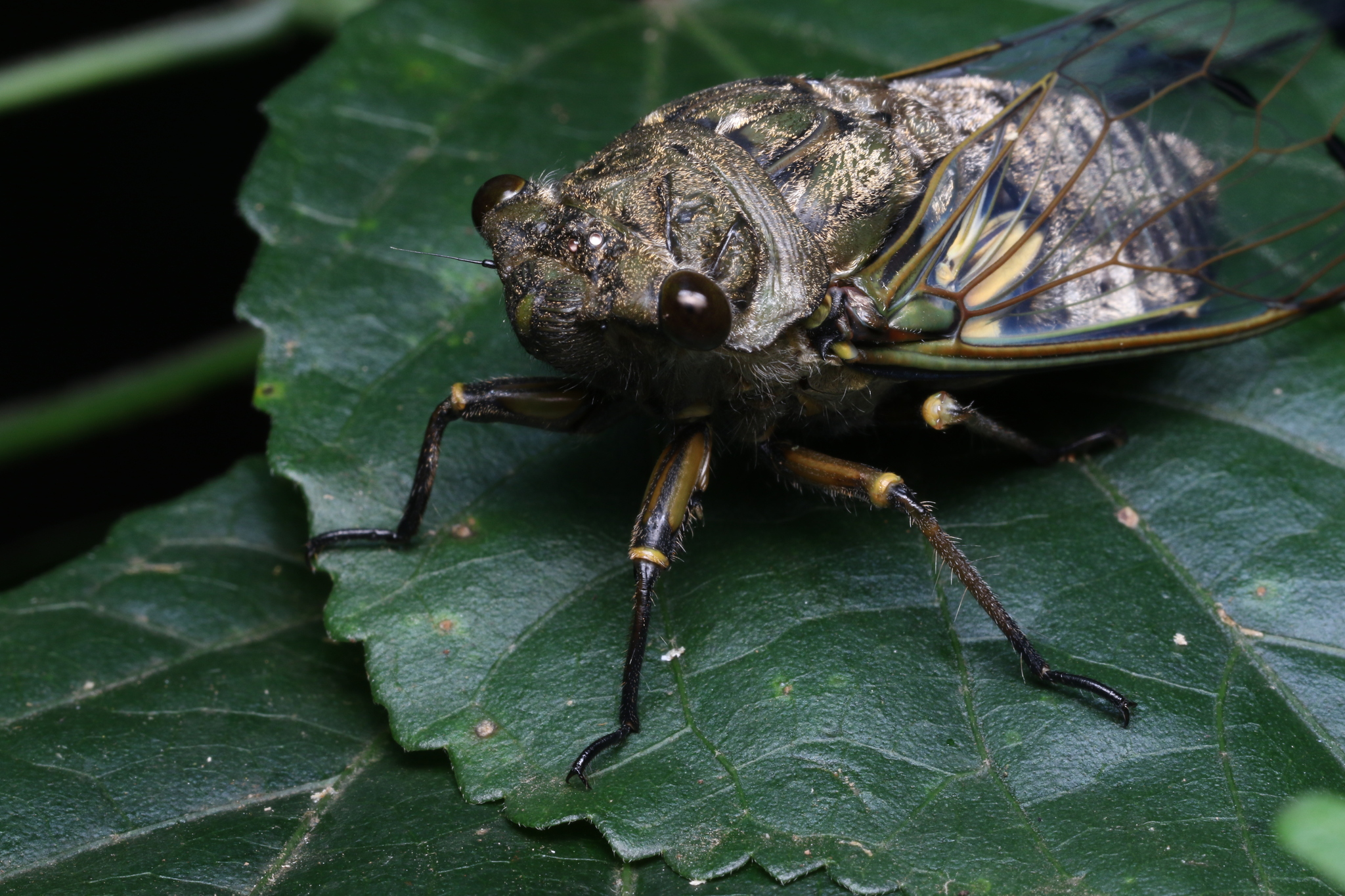
- Quesada sodalis, Brasil

Scientific classification
- Domain: Eukaryota
- Kingdom: Animalia
- Phylum: Arthropoda
- Class: Insecta
- Order: Hemiptera
- Suborder: Auchenorrhyncha
- Family: Cicadidae
- Genus: Quesada
- Species: Q. sodalis

Binomial name
- Quesada sodalis (Walker)

Synonyms
- Cicada sodalis Walker, 1850; Fidicina vultur Walker, 1858; Tympanoterpes sodalis (Walker, 1850)

= Quesada sodalis =

Species of insect

Quesada sodalis is a species of cicada in the family Cicadidae. It is found in South America.

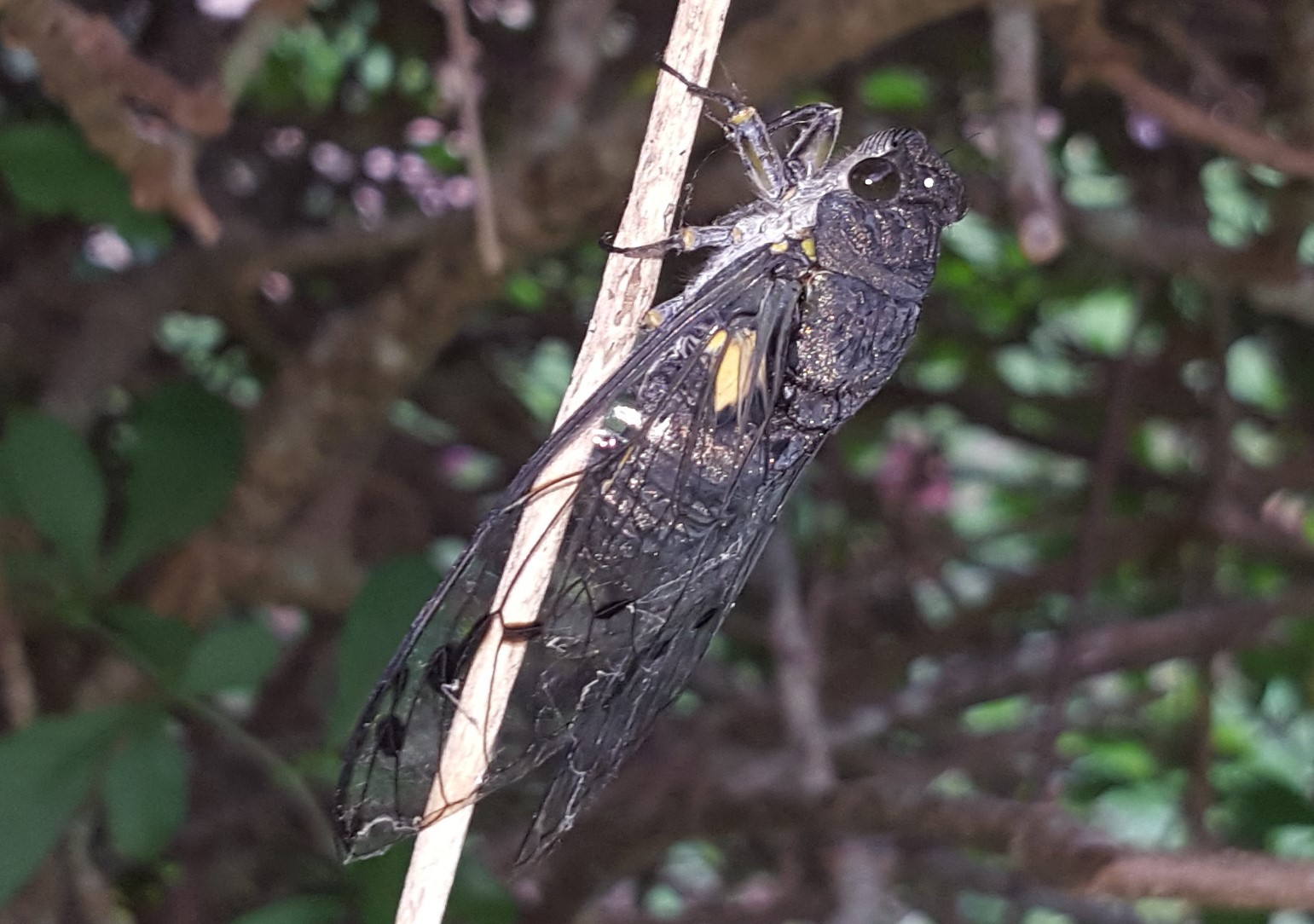
Quesada sodalis, Brasil
