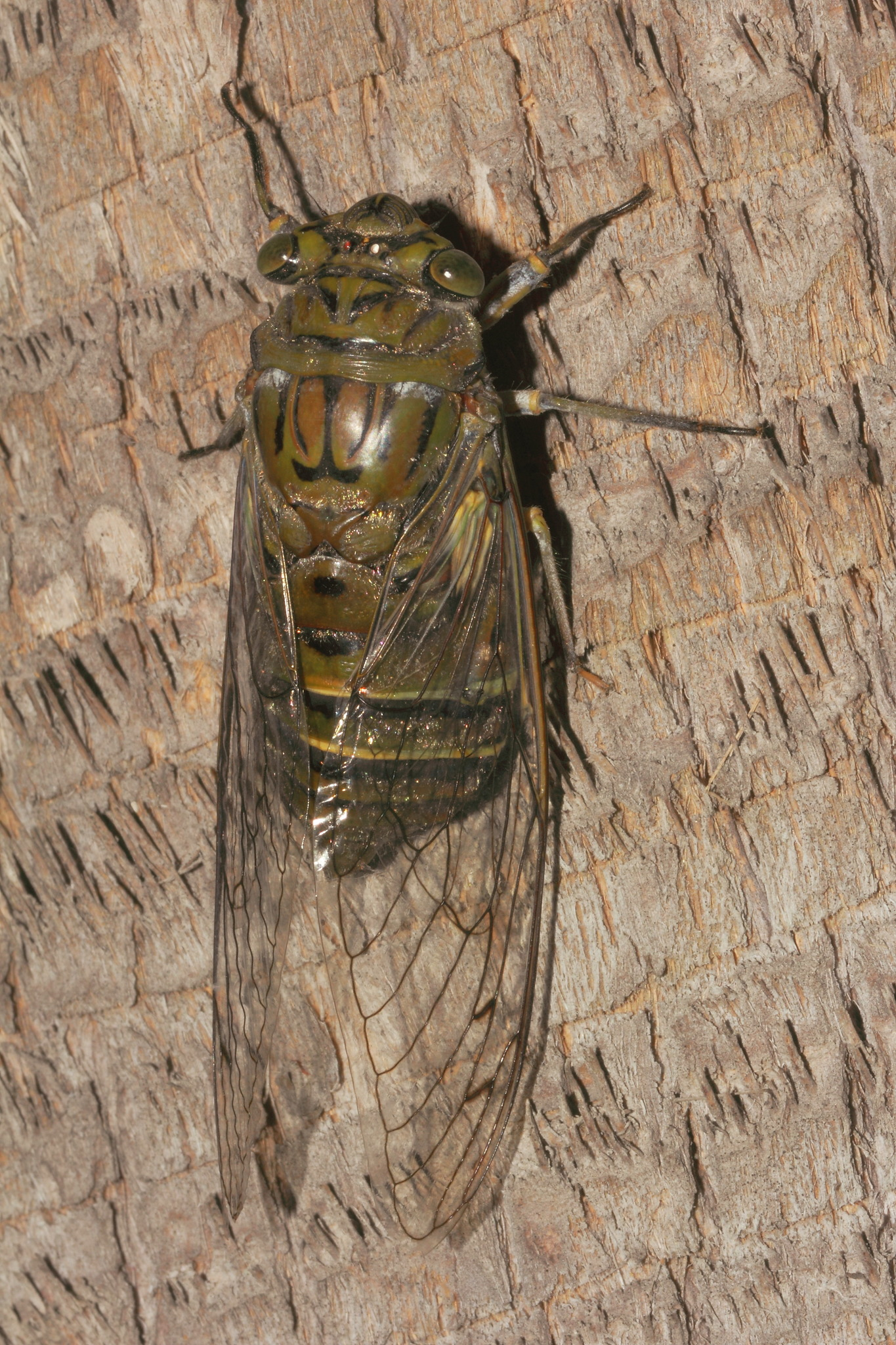
- Quesada gigas, México

Scientific classification
- Domain: Eukaryota
- Kingdom: Animalia
- Phylum: Arthropoda
- Class: Insecta
- Order: Hemiptera
- Suborder: Auchenorrhyncha
- Family: Cicadidae
- Subfamily: Cicadinae
- Tribe: Fidicinini
- Subtribe: Guyalnina
- Genus: Quesada; Distant, 1905

Synonyms
- Queseda Distant, 1905; Quezada Distant, 1905

= Quesada (cicada) =

Genus of true bugs

Quesada is a genus of Cicadas in the family Cicadidae. There are at least two described species in Quesada.

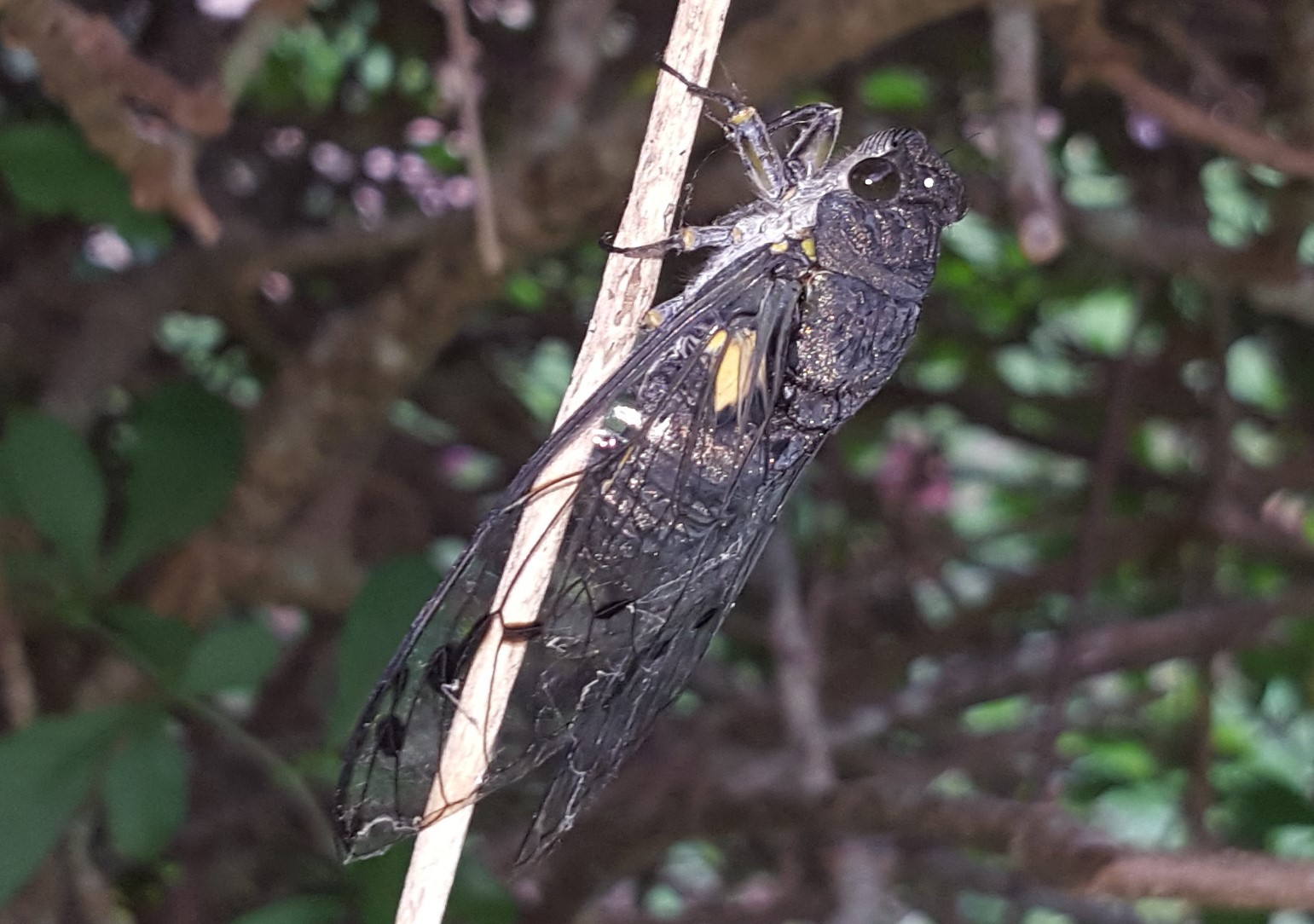
Quesada sodalis, Brasil

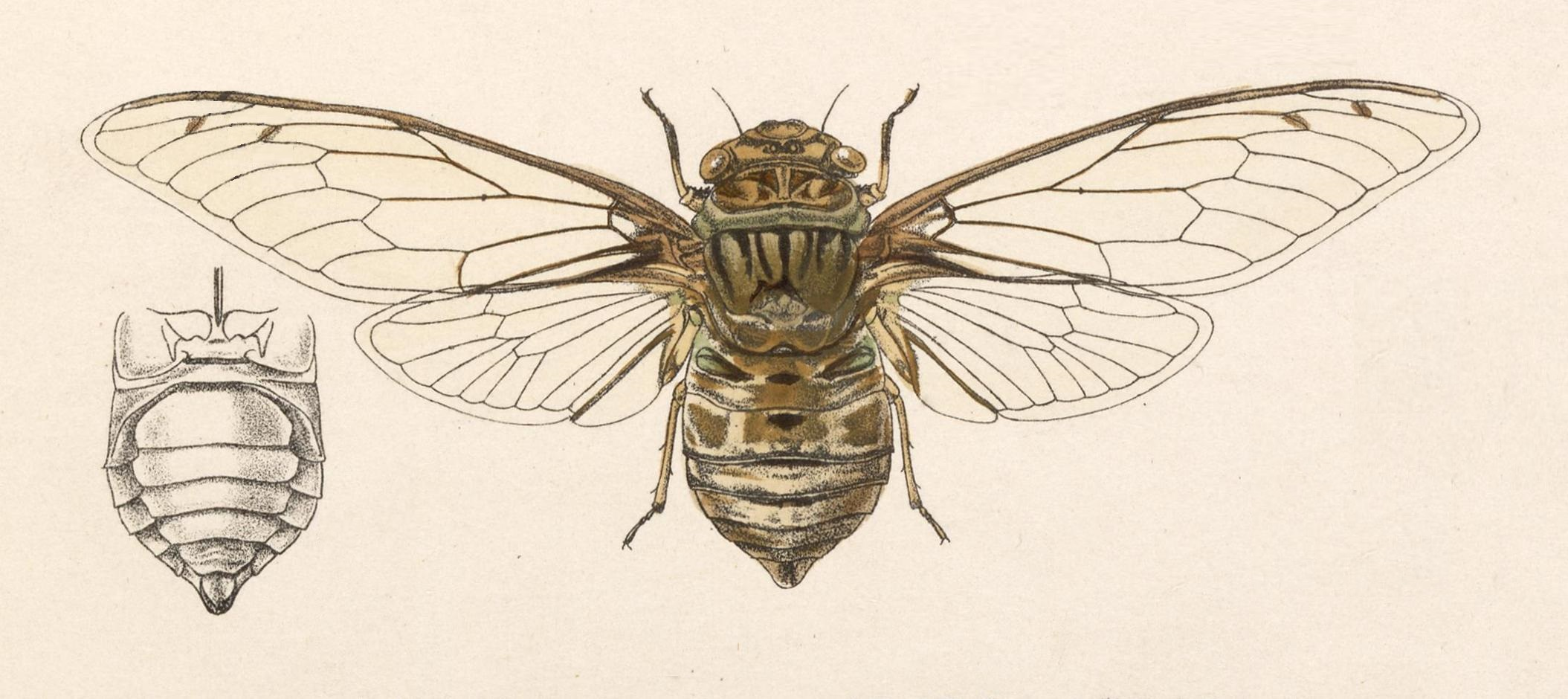
Quesada gigas, male

== Species ==
These two species belong to the genus Quesada:

- Quesada gigas (Olivier, 1790) (Texas, Mexico, Central and South America)
- Quesada sodalis (Walker) (South America)
