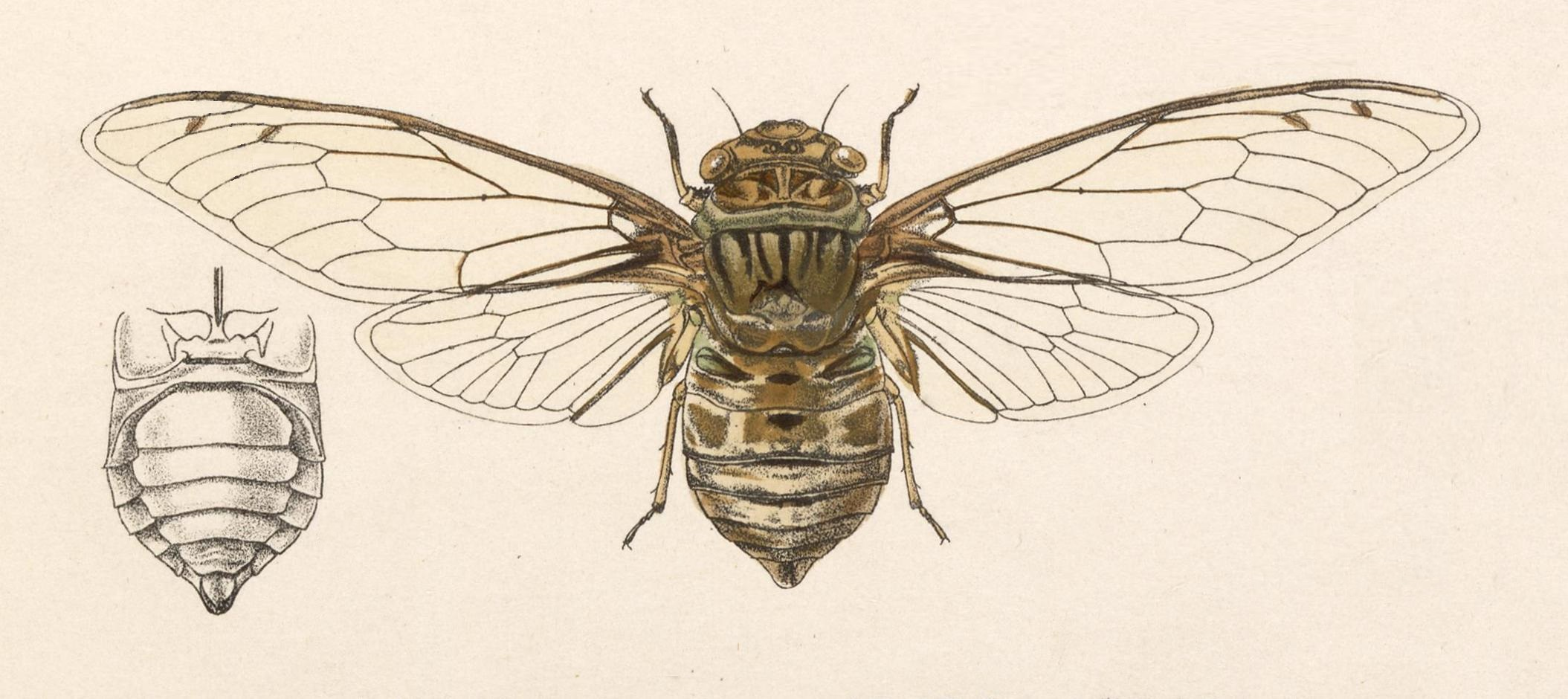
- Quesada gigas, male

Scientific classification
- Kingdom: Animalia
- Phylum: Arthropoda
- Clade: Pancrustacea
- Class: Insecta
- Order: Hemiptera
- Suborder: Auchenorrhyncha
- Family: Cicadidae
- Subfamily: Cicadinae
- Tribe: Hyantiini; Distant, 1905

Genera
- Several, see text

= Hyantiini =

Tribe of true bugs

The Hyantiini are a tribe of cicadas from North and South America.

== List of genera ==
- Hyantia Stål, 1866
- Mura Distant, 1905
- Quesada Distant, 1905
