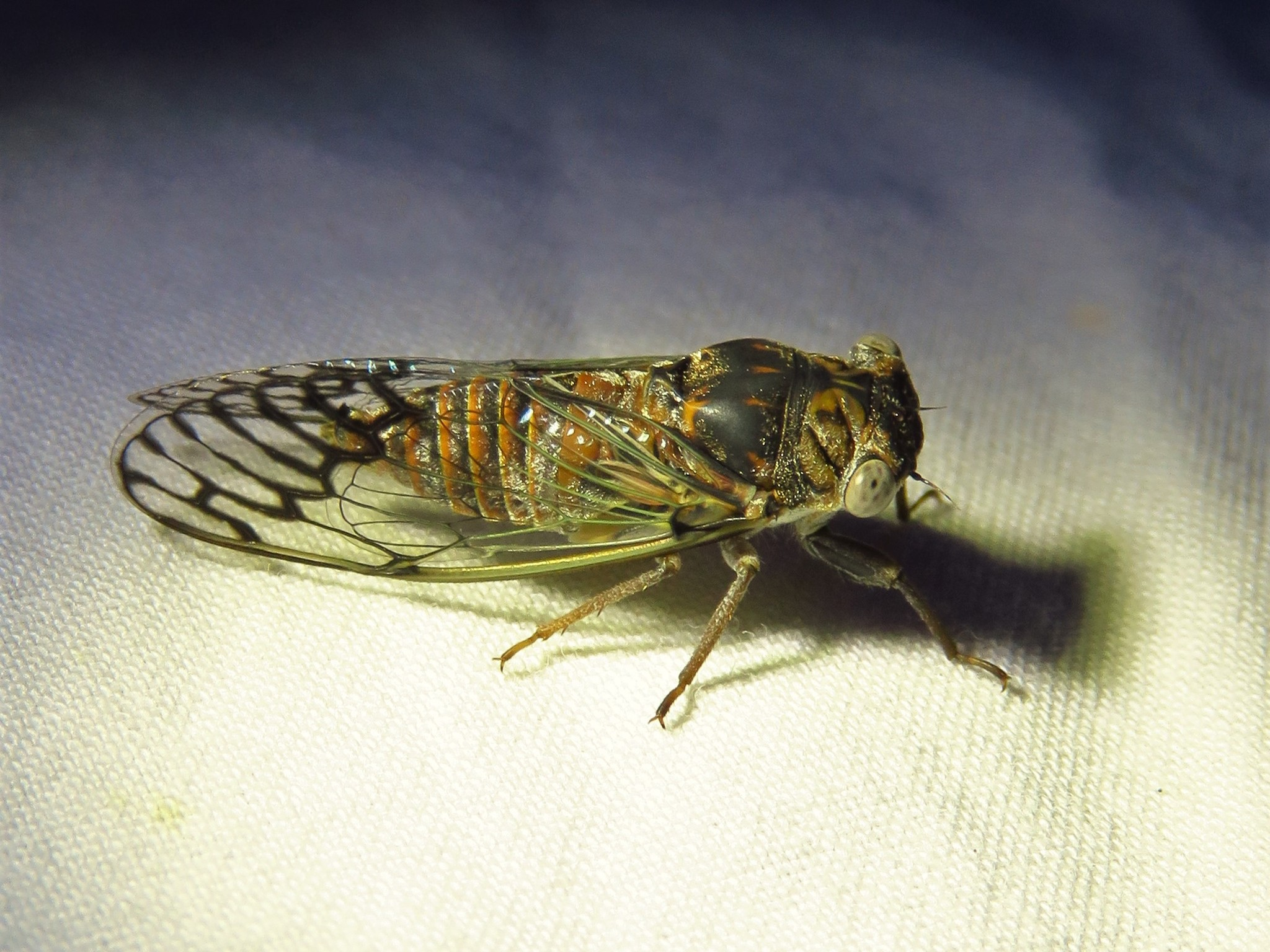

Scientific classification
- Domain: Eukaryota
- Kingdom: Animalia
- Phylum: Arthropoda
- Class: Insecta
- Order: Hemiptera
- Suborder: Auchenorrhyncha
- Family: Cicadidae
- Genus: Pacarina
- Species: P. puella

Binomial name
- Pacarina puella Davis, 1923

= Pacarina puella =

Species of true bug

Pacarina puella, the little mesquite cicada, is a species of cicada in the family Cicadidae. It is found in Central America and North America.
