= Beameria =

Scientific classification
- Domain: Eukaryota
- Kingdom: Animalia
- Phylum: Arthropoda
- Class: Insecta
- Order: Hemiptera
- Suborder: Auchenorrhyncha
- Family: Cicadidae
- Subfamily: Cicadinae
- Genus: Beameria; Davis, 1934

Genus of true bugs

Beameria is a genus of cicadas in the family Cicadidae. There are at least three described species in Beameria.

== Species ==
These three species belong to the genus Beameria:

- Beameria ansercollis Sanborn & M. Heath in Sanborn, M. Heath, Phillips & J. Heath, 2011
- Beameria venosa (Uhler, 1888)
- Beameria wheeleri Davis, 1934
