= Pacarina (cicada) =

Scientific classification
- Domain: Eukaryota
- Kingdom: Animalia
- Phylum: Arthropoda
- Class: Insecta
- Order: Hemiptera
- Suborder: Auchenorrhyncha
- Family: Cicadidae
- Subfamily: Cicadinae
- Genus: Pacarina; Distant, 1905

Genus of true bugs

Pacarina is a genus of cicadas in the family Cicadidae. There are at least four described species in Pacarina.

== Species ==
- Pacarina championi (Distant, 1881)
- Pacarina puella Davis, 1923 (little mesquite cicada)
- Pacarina schumanni Distant, 1905
- Pacarina shoemakeri Sanborn & M. Heath in Sanborn, M. Heath, Phillips & J. Heath, 2012 (little juniper cicada)
