= Belindo Adolfo Torres =

Argentine entomologist (1917–1965)

Belindo Adolfo Torres (3 April 1917 – 4 November 1965) was an entomologist from Argentina.

== Publications ==
- Torres, Belindo Adolfo. 1948. Sobre seis nuevas especies del género Carineta Amy. et Serv. (Homoptera-Cicadidae). Notas del Museo de La Plata, vol. 13, Zoología, no. 103. 113-127.
- Torres, Belindo Adolfo. 1958. Revision del genero "Tettigades" Amy. y Serv. (Homoptera - Cicadidae). Revista del Museo de la Plata (nueva serie), vol. 7, Zoología, no. 53. 51-106.
- Torres, Belindo Adolfo. 1958. Nuevo genero de homoptero Alarcta Torres (Auchenorrhyncha - Cicadidae). Revista del Museo de la Plata (nueva serie), vol. 7, Zoología, no. 51. 23-34.
- Torres, Belindo Adolfo. 1958. Nuevos generos Acyroneura y Acuticephala. Guaranisaria bicolor nueva especie (Homoptera - Cicadidae). Neotropica, vol. 4, no. 13. 17-26.
- Torres, Belindo Adolfo. 1958. Psephenotettix y Calliopsida, nuevos generos de homopteros (Auchenorrhyncha - Cicadidae). Neotropica, vol. 4, no. 14. 34-42.
- Torres, Belindo Adolfo. 1963. Colección Breyer. Revista de la Sociedad entomológica argentina 26(1/4):88
