= Guyalnina =

Scientific classification
- Domain: Eukaryota
- Kingdom: Animalia
- Phylum: Arthropoda
- Class: Insecta
- Order: Hemiptera
- Suborder: Auchenorrhyncha
- Family: Cicadidae
- Tribe: Fidicinini
- Subtribe: Guyalnina; Boulard & Martinelli, 1996

Subtribe of insects

Guyalnina is a subtribe of cicadas in the family Cicadidae. It was first described by Boulard and Martinelli in 1996.
