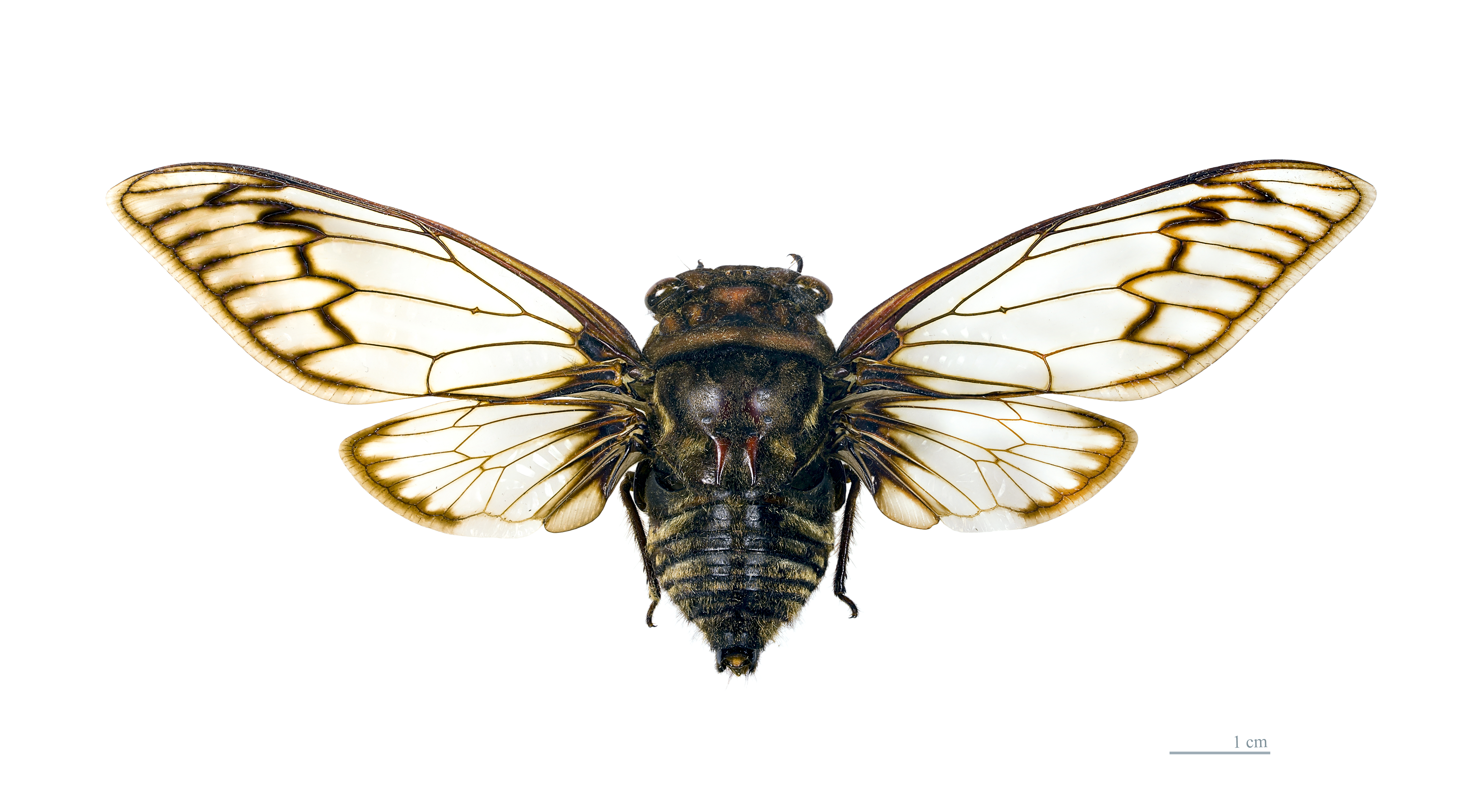
- Fidicina ethelae

Scientific classification
- Domain: Eukaryota
- Kingdom: Animalia
- Phylum: Arthropoda
- Class: Insecta
- Order: Hemiptera
- Suborder: Auchenorrhyncha
- Infraorder: Cicadomorpha
- Superfamily: Cicadoidea
- Family: Cicadidae
- Subfamily: Cicadinae
- Tribe: Fidicinini; Distant, 1905

= Fidicinini =

Tribe of true bugs

The Fidicinini (Boulard & Martinelli, 1996) are a tribe of cicadas. There are at least 20 genera and 250 described species in Fidicinini, found in the Nearctic and Palearctic.

== List of genera ==
These 25 genera belong to the tribe Fidicinini:

- Acanthoventris Ruschel, 2023
- Ariasa Distant, 1905^{i c g}
- Beameria Davis, 1934^{i c g b}
- Bergalna Boulard & Martinelli, 1996^{i c g}
- Cracenpsaltria Sanborn, 2016^{c g}
- Diceroprocta Stål, 1870^{i c g b} (scrub cicadas)
- Dorisiana Metcalf, 1952^{i c g}
- Elassoneura Torres, 1964^{i c g}
- Fidicina Amyot & Audinet-Serville, 1843^{i c g}
- Fidicinoides Boulard & Martinelli, 1996^{i c g}
- Guyalna Boulard & Martinelli, 1996^{i c g}
- Hemisciera Amyot & Audinet-Serville, 1843^{i c g}
- Hyantia Stål, 1866^{i c g}
- Hyantiini Distant, 1905: 304. n. syn^{i}
- Majeorona Distant, 1905^{i c g}
- Mura Distant, 1905^{i c g}
- Nosola Stål, 1866^{i c g}
- Ollanta Distant, 1905^{i c g}
- Orialella Metcalf, 1952^{i c g}
- Pacarina Distant, 1905^{i c g b}
- Pompanonia Boulard, 1982^{i c g}
- Prasinosoma Torres, 1963^{i c g}
- Proarna Stål, 1864^{i c g}
- Quesada Distant, 1905^{i c g b}
- Tympanoterpes Stål, 1861^{i c g}

Data sources: i = ITIS, c = Catalogue of Life, g = GBIF, b = Bugguide.net

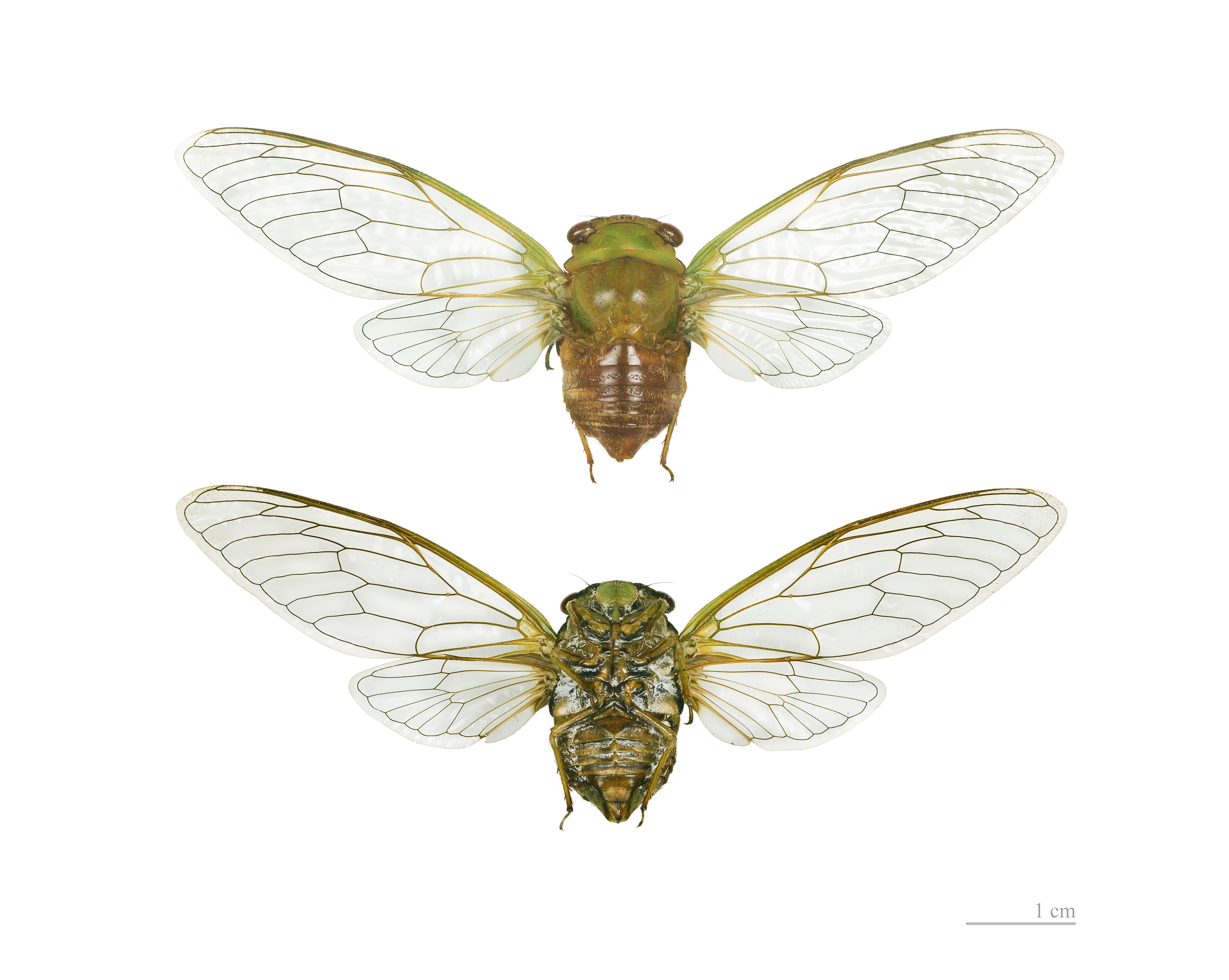
Dorisiana - Dorisiana bicolor

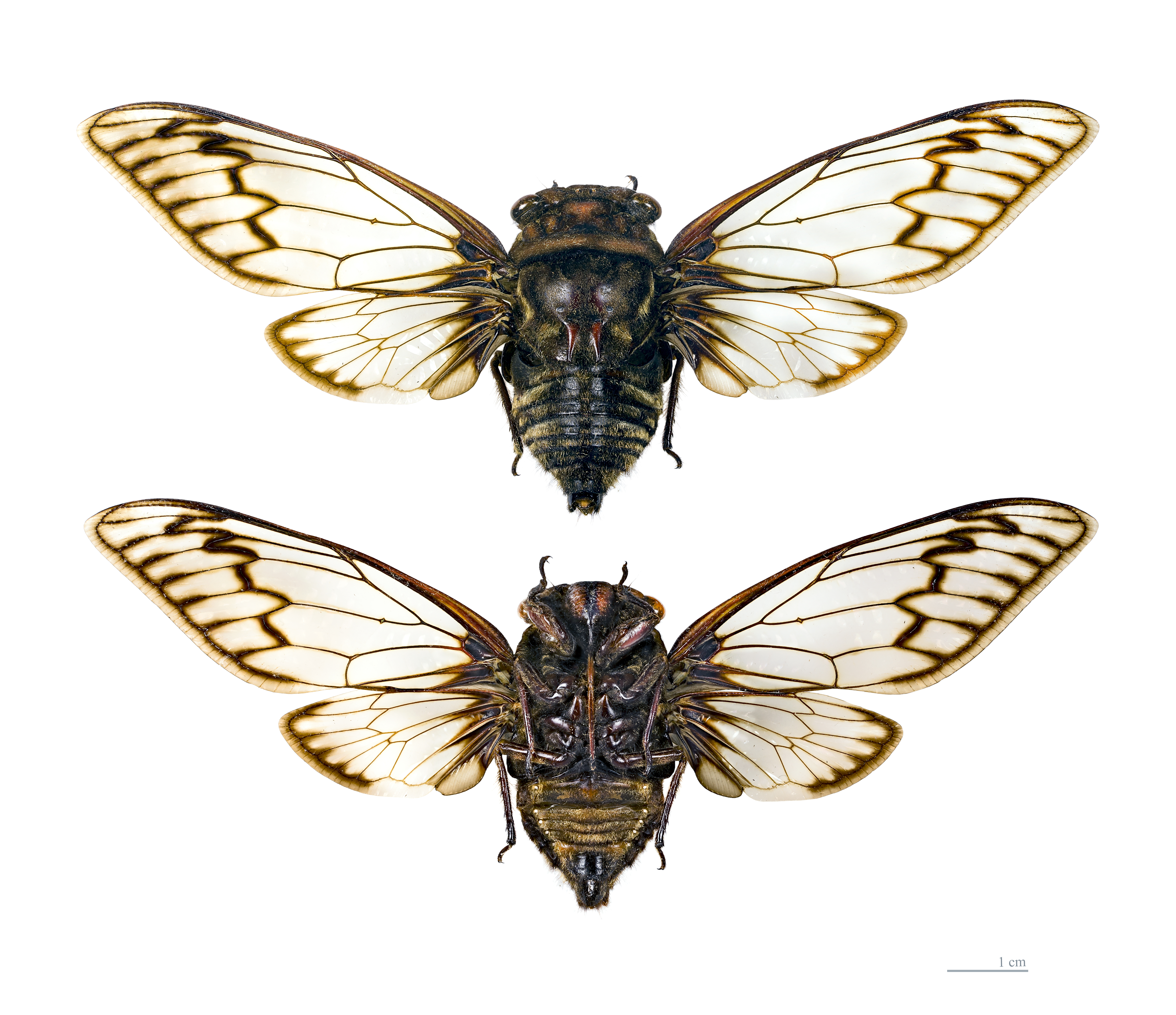
Fidicina- Fidicina ethelae

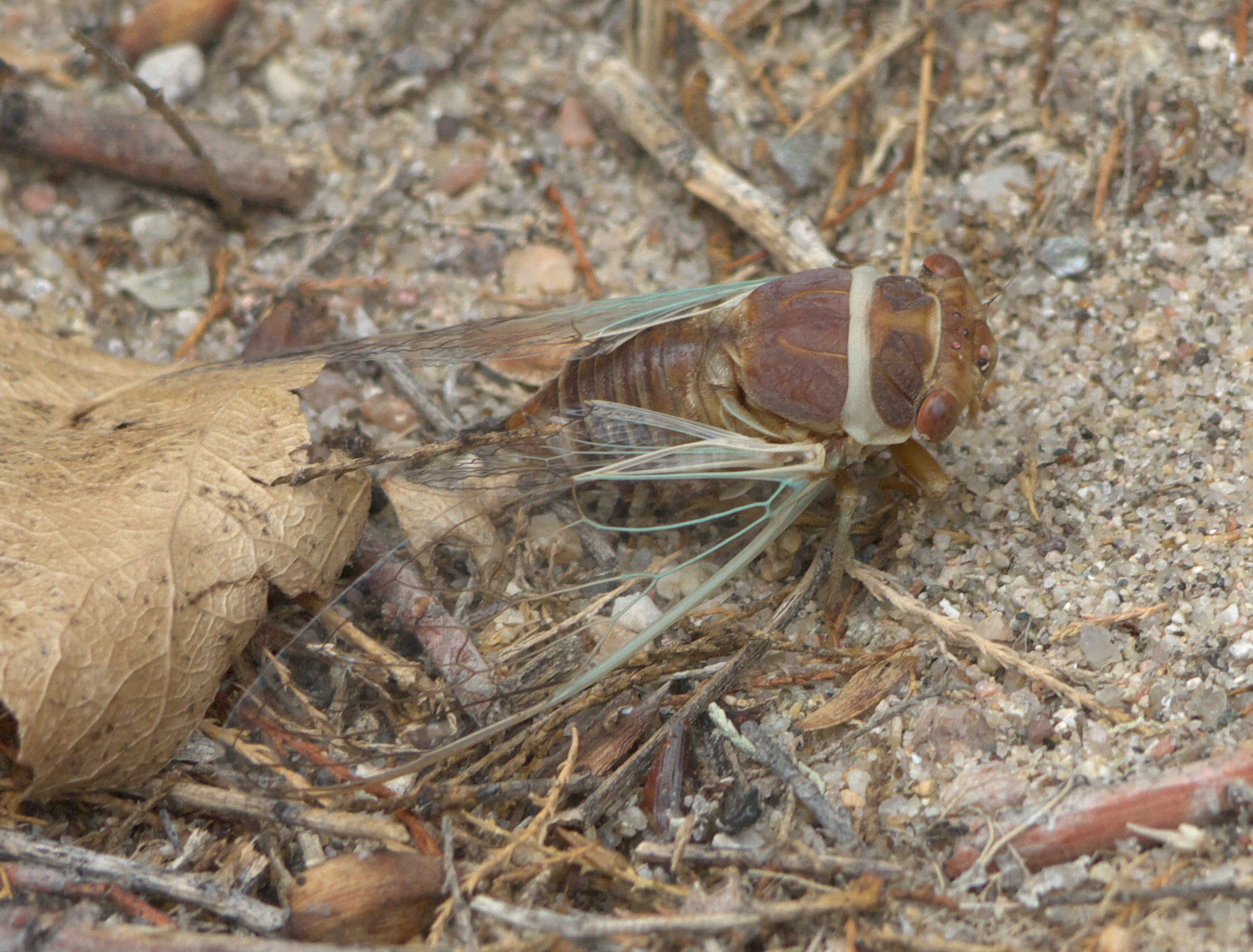
Diceroprocta apache

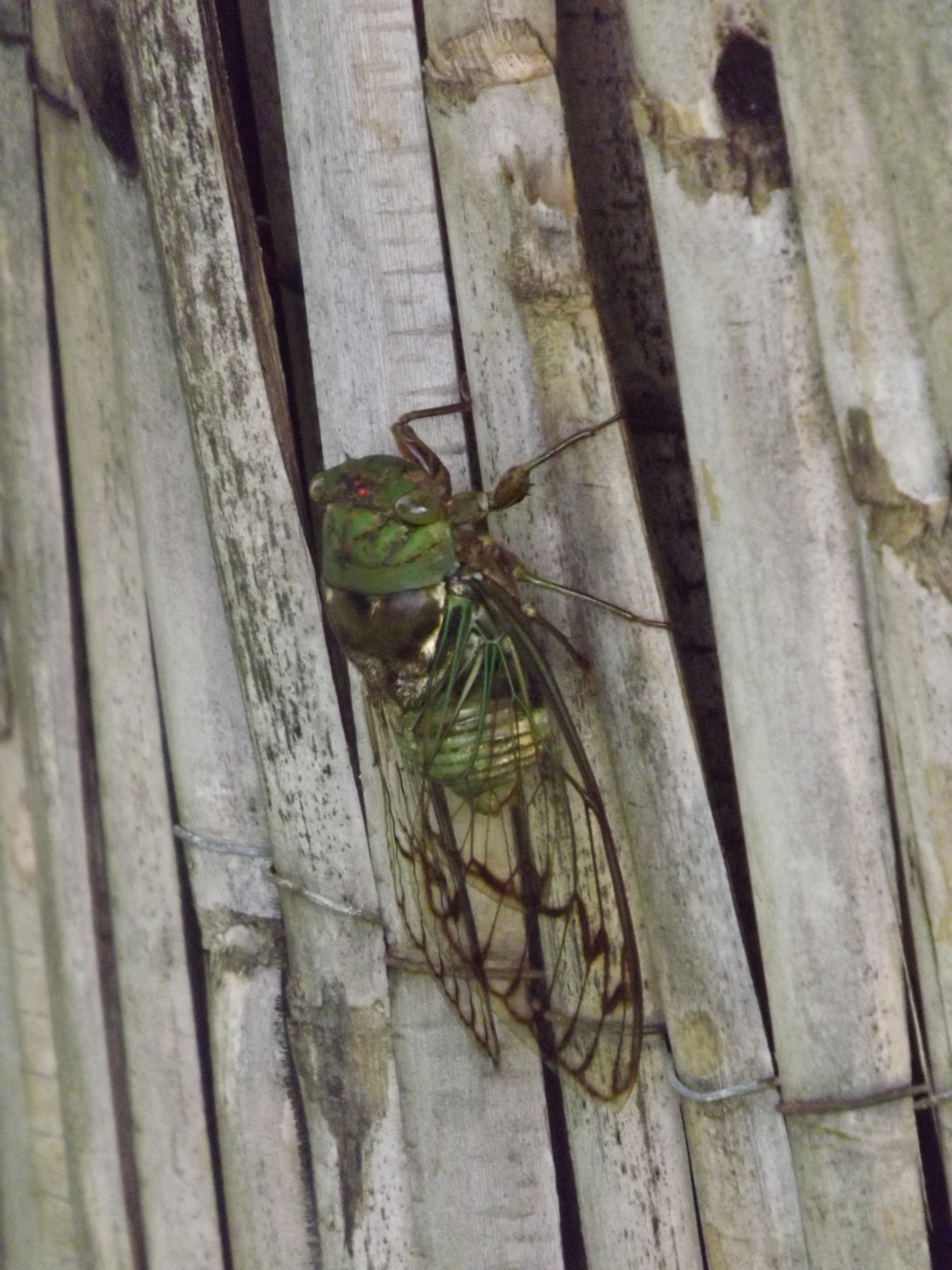
Fidicina mannifera
