= Tibicenini =

Former tribe of cicadas

Tibicenini is a former tribe name from the insect family Cicadidae (the true cicadas), based on the family group taxon established by Distant (1889). As of 2021, the name became unavailable to zoological nomenclature due to the suppression of its type genus Tibicen Berthold, 1827 by the International Commission on Zoological Nomenclature. Cicada genera grouped at the tribe level with genus Lyristes (the current name for the former genus Tibicen) are generally referenced under the name Cryptotympanini Handlirsch, 1925.
