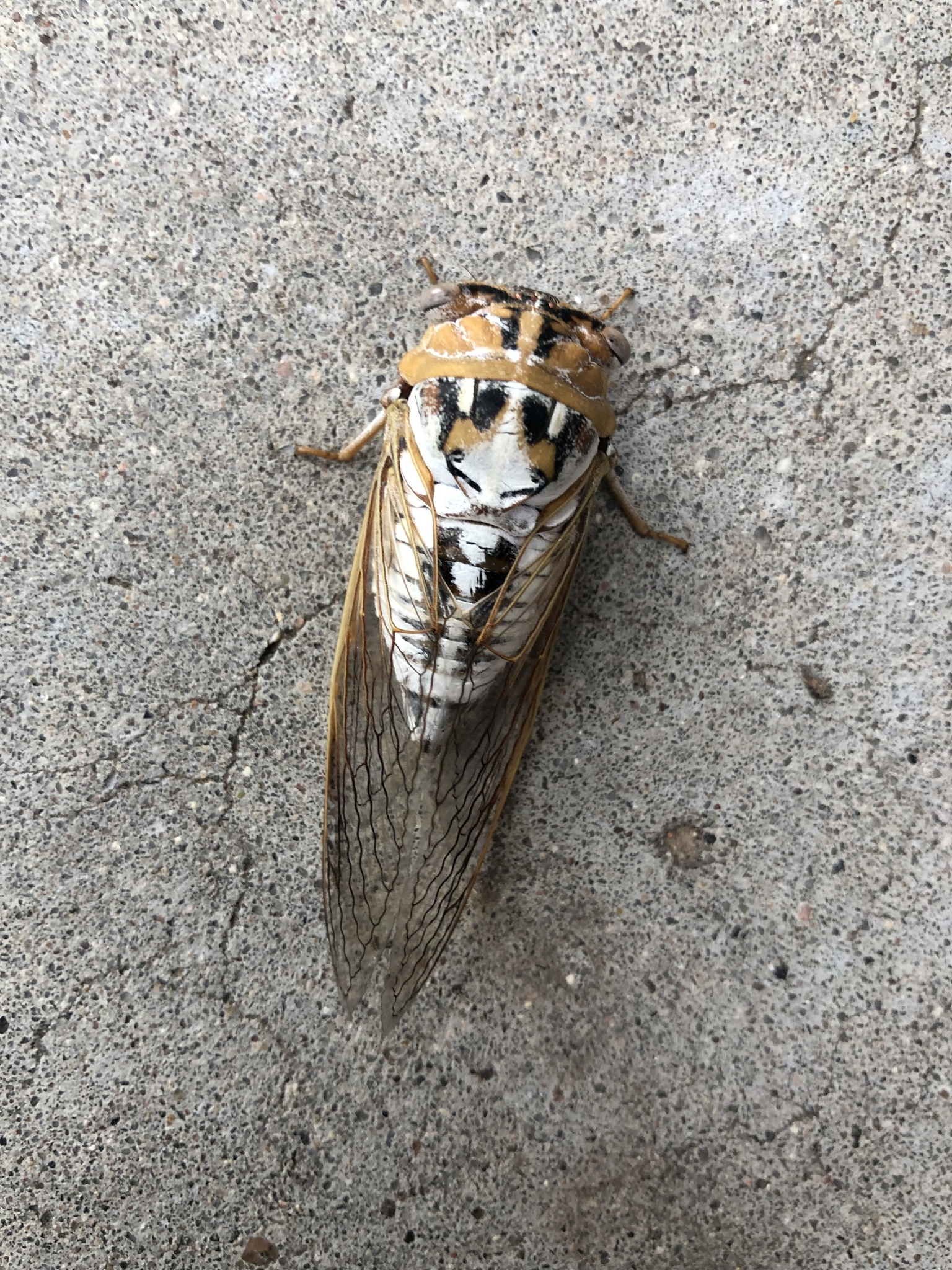

Scientific classification
- Domain: Eukaryota
- Kingdom: Animalia
- Phylum: Arthropoda
- Class: Insecta
- Order: Hemiptera
- Suborder: Auchenorrhyncha
- Family: Cicadidae
- Genus: Megatibicen
- Species: M. dealbatus

Binomial name
- Megatibicen dealbatus (Davis, 1915)

Synonyms
- Tibicen dealbatus Davis, 1915; Neotibicen dealbatus (Davis, 1915)

= Neotibicen dealbatus =

Megatibicen dealbatus

Species of true bug

Megatibicen dealbatus, commonly called the plains cicada, is a species of annual cicada. Dealbatus is Latin for "whitewashed".

This species used to be called Tibicen dealbatus, but in July 2015, after genetic and physiological evaluation and reconfiguration of the genus Tibicen, this cicada and others in the genus Tibicen were moved to newly created genera. Furthermore, the genus Tibicen still exists, but today it only encompasses a small number of European taxa.

== Description and identification ==
M. dealbatus adults have beige-colored eyes. and like many other cicadas in the genus. have a distinctive black "mask" that extends from each of the cicada's bulging eyes. This species' pronotum is light orange or olive green. The coloring of its mesonotum is orange, green, black, or brown with three white pruinosity areas on the dorsum separated by stripes.

This species may be confused for a superficially similar, but distantly related Megatibicen species: Megatibicen dorsatus. Certain overlapping diagnostic traits are found in both cicadas, such as the pruinose patterning on the abdomen and narrow head. This can complicate accurate identification or lead to erroneous reports, but the call of males and other morphological differences, coupled with geographic locations of both species, are other factors that can aid in correct identification and separation of the two.

== Distribution ==
Populations of M. dealbatus are located in central North America in the U.S. Great Plains region where habitat is favorable. This species is found east of the Rocky Mountains and west of the Mississippi River. It has been reported from Colorado, Iowa, Kansas, Montana, Nebraska, New Mexico, North Dakota, Oklahoma, South Dakota, Texas, and Wyoming.

== Habitat ==
M. dealbatus is found in the grassland ecosystems, often in riparian habitats because of the associated trees, adults frequent cottonwoods (Populus) and willows (Salix), as well as ornamental and nut trees.

Nymphs are subterranean and feed on roots of trees and other plants.

== Lifecycle ==
As with all other annual cicada species, the complete lifecycle of M. dealbatus is about 3–5 years long. Only males call to females during the day, preferably from grasses and shrubs in grassland ecosystems. The typical peak activity is from 10 am until 6 pm, usually when the sun is bright and the ambient air temperature is warm. The call of the male is produced by a powerful muscle and membrane in the abdomen called a tymbal, which vibrates, contracts, and releases to produce the sound. The call is amplified because the abdomen of the insect is mostly hollow. Moreover, the calls of cicadas are species-specific and the male calls are distinct, complex songs and phrases composed of a diverse array of clicks, buzzes, chirps, drones, and chatters.

Females communicate to males by clicking their wings, a signal that they are ready for mating. After mating, females lay eggs in dead branches of small trees or shrubs; using an ovipositor to slit a branch and insert eggs. Later, the eggs hatch and nymphs drop to the soil and quickly burrow and feed on the roots of plants. Five instars occur in which nymphs grow in size by shedding their skins underground. Once mature (after the 3- to 5-year feeding period underground), the nymphs emerge from the ground through tunnel systems during the summer. They crawl up trees, grasses, shrubs, buildings, or other stable structures and shed their final skin. At this stage, they are teneral, but they dry overnight and fly away by dawn to continue the cycle. Healthy adult cicadas of this species may live as long as two months. The dry, brown shells (exuviae) remain attached to plants and buildings. Throughout most of the range, this species is active from July to September. Emergence and decline dates vary from year to year and from location to location.

== Diet ==
Adults of M. dealbatus feed on numerous vascular plants by using their piercing, sucking mouthparts to reach the xylem of the plant and consume the fluids. As nymphs, they feed on the roots of plants.

== Natural predators ==
Cicadas have many predators because of their relatively few defenses. A multitude of mammals, birds, reptilians, and arthropods consume cicadas.

Cicada killer wasps frequently attack Megatibicen cicadas. The female wasp's keen eye scans trees and vegetation in search of prey. After locating a cicada, the wasp stings it, injecting paralyzing venom. The wasp then drags the paralyzed victim up a tree or post and flies away with it back to her nest. The cicada is buried in a burrow along with the wasp's eggs. The wasp's larvae emerge and feed on the living but paralyzed prey, pupate, and emerge the following spring. Usually, one generation of wasps happens per year.
