= Cacama collinaplaga =

Scientific classification
- Kingdom: Animalia
- Phylum: Arthropoda
- Clade: Pancrustacea
- Class: Insecta
- Order: Hemiptera
- Suborder: Auchenorrhyncha
- Family: Cicadidae
- Subtribe: Tacuina
- Genus: Cacama
- Species: C. collinaplaga

Binomial name
- Cacama collinaplaga Sanborn & Heath in Sanborn, Heath, Phillips & Heath, 2011

Species of true bug

Cacama collinaplaga is a species of cicada in the family Cicadidae. It is found in North America.
