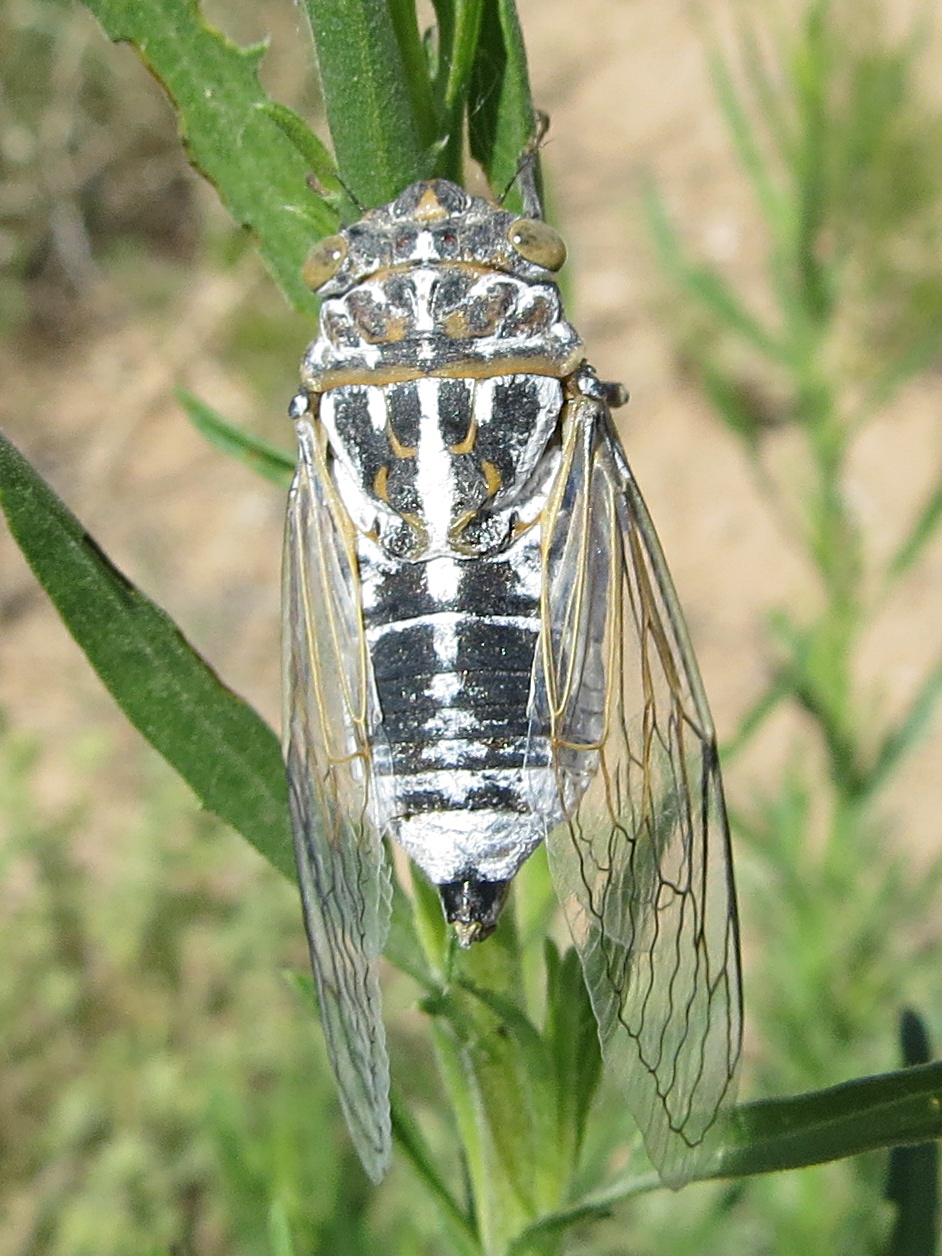
- Hadoa bifida

Scientific classification
- Kingdom: Animalia
- Phylum: Arthropoda
- Clade: Pancrustacea
- Class: Insecta
- Order: Hemiptera
- Suborder: Auchenorrhyncha
- Family: Cicadidae
- Tribe: Tacuini
- Subtribe: Tacuina
- Genus: Hadoa; Moulds, 2015

= Hadoa =

Genus of true bugs

The genus Hadoa comprises large-bodied Cicadidae occurring in Western North America. Until recently, these species were in the genus Tibicen (now genus Lyristes Horvath, 1926), which has now been redefined so as to include only a few European species, while most species from the Eastern and Central US are now placed in Neotibicen and Megatibicen.

== Species ==
These 20 species are members of the genus Hadoa:

- Hadoa bifida (Davis, 1916)
- Hadoa chihuahuaensis (Sanborn, 2007)
- Hadoa chiricahua (Davis, 1923)
- Hadoa chisosensis (Davis, 1934)
- Hadoa distanti (Metcalf, 1963)
- Hadoa duryi (Davis, 1917)
- Hadoa fusca (Davis, 1934)
- Hadoa hidalgoensis (Davis, 1941)
- Hadoa inaudita (Davis, 1917)
- Hadoa longiopercula (Davis, 1926)
- Hadoa minor (Davis, 1934)
- Hadoa montezuma (Distant, 1881)
- Hadoa neomexicensis (Stucky, 2013)
- Hadoa parallela (Davis, 1923)
- Hadoa paralleloides (Davis, 1934)
- Hadoa robusta (Distant, 1881)
- Hadoa simplex (Davis, 1941)
- Hadoa sugdeni (Davis, 1941)
- Hadoa texana (Metcalf, 1963)
- Hadoa townsendii (Uhler, 1905)
