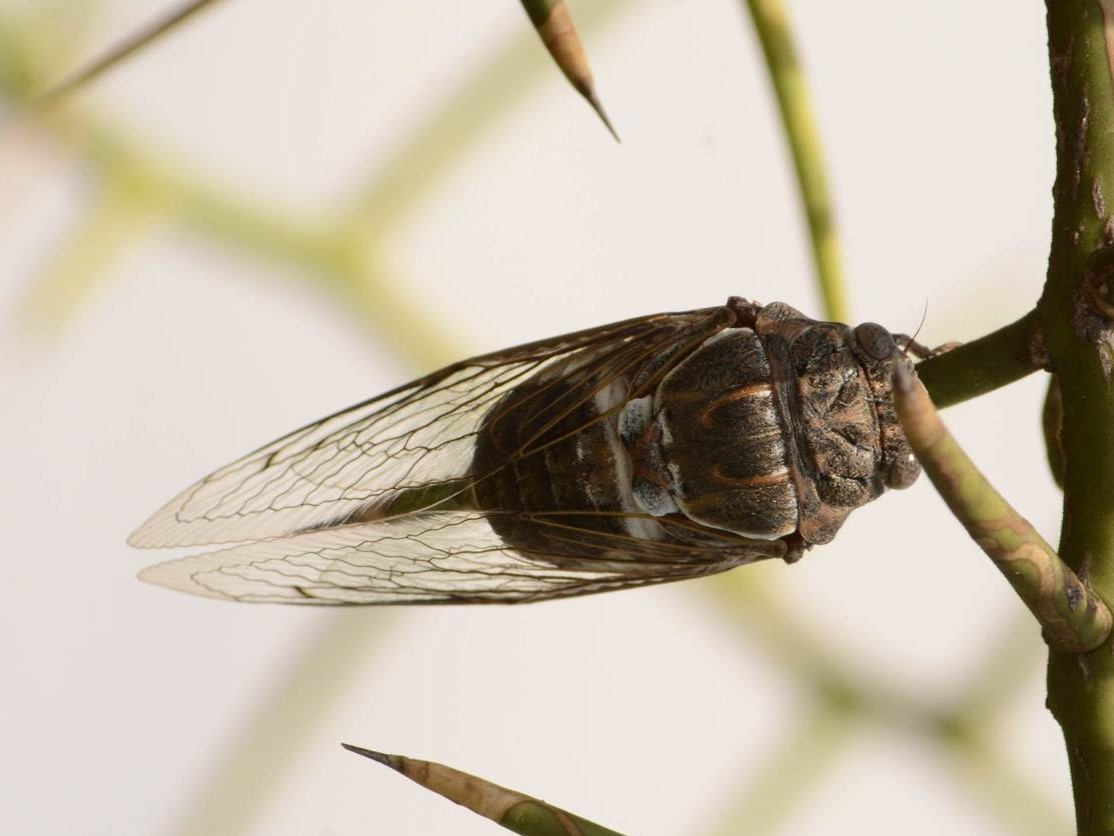

Scientific classification
- Kingdom: Animalia
- Phylum: Arthropoda
- Clade: Pancrustacea
- Class: Insecta
- Order: Hemiptera
- Suborder: Auchenorrhyncha
- Family: Cicadidae
- Subtribe: Tacuina
- Genus: Cacama
- Species: C. variegata

Binomial name
- Cacama variegata Davis, 1919

= Cacama variegata =

Species of true bug

Cacama variegata, the variegated cactus dodger, is a species of cicada in the family Cicadidae. It is found in Central America and North America.
