= Tibiceninae =

Former subfamily of cicadas

Tibiceninae is a former subfamily name from the insect family Cicadidae (the true cicadas). It was first used by Distant (1889). As of 2021, the name became unavailable to zoological nomenclature due to the suppression of its type genus Tibicen Berthold, 1827 by the International Commission on Zoological Nomenclature. Cicada genera grouped at the subfamily level with genus Lyristes (the current name for the former genus Tibicen) are generally referenced under the name Cicadinae Latreille, 1802.
