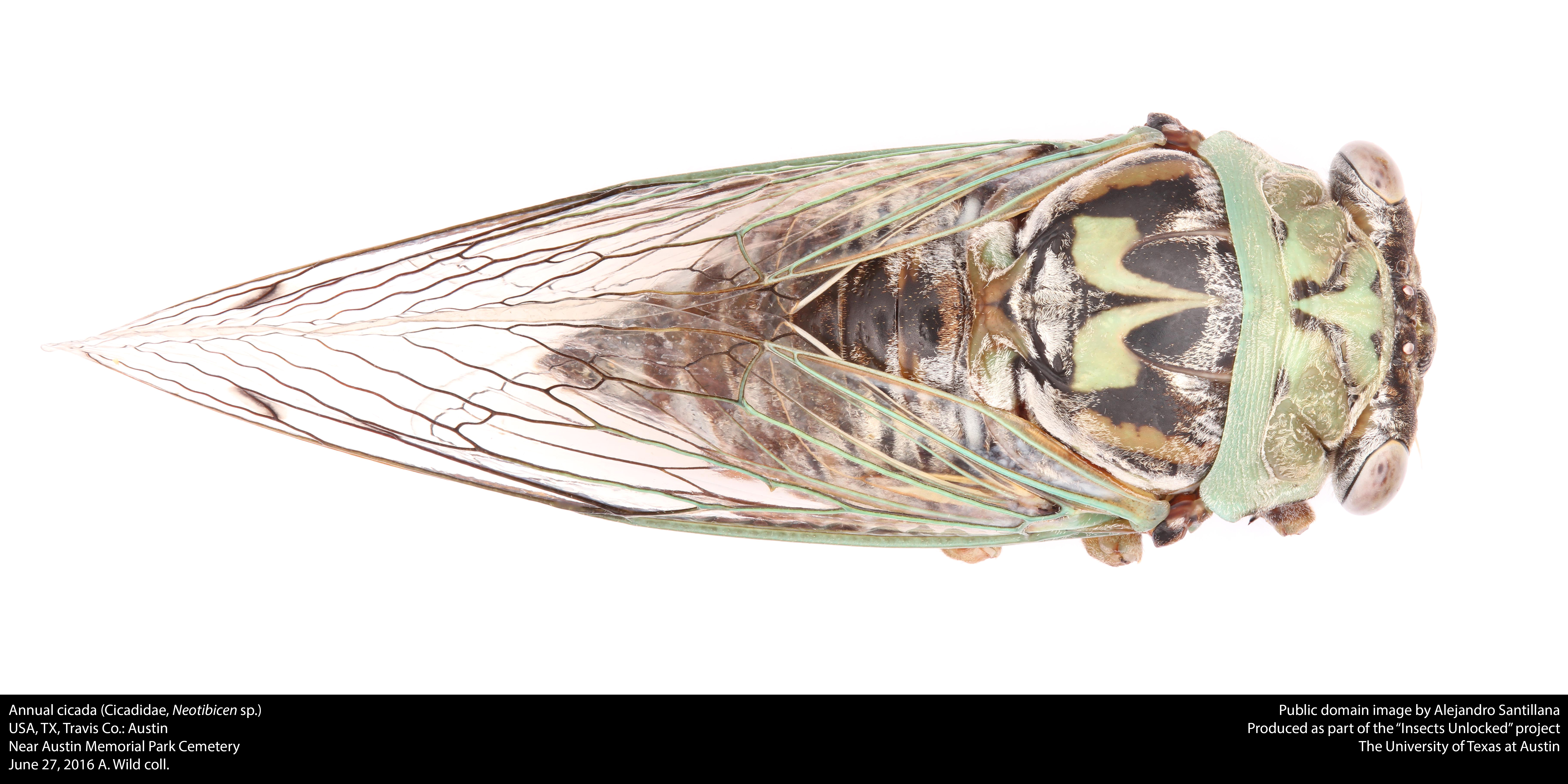

Scientific classification
- Kingdom: Animalia
- Phylum: Arthropoda
- Clade: Pancrustacea
- Class: Insecta
- Order: Hemiptera
- Suborder: Auchenorrhyncha
- Family: Cicadidae
- Tribe: Tacuini
- Subtribe: Tacuina
- Genus: Megatibicen
- Species: M. resh

Binomial name
- Megatibicen resh (Haldeman, 1852)

= Megatibicen resh =

Species of true bug

Megatibicen resh, the resh cicada or western dusk singing cicada, is a species of cicada in the family Cicadidae, found in North America.
