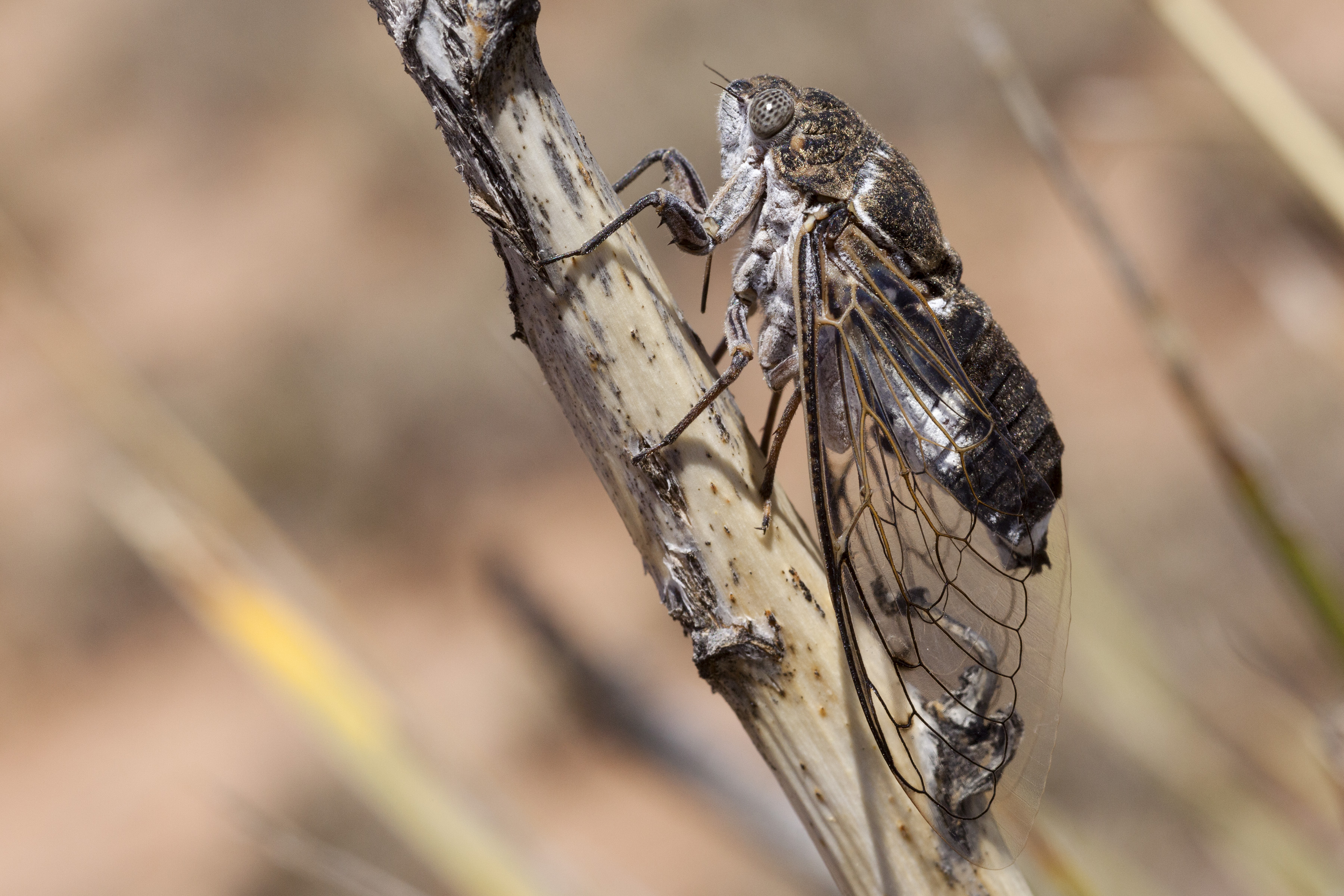

Scientific classification
- Kingdom: Animalia
- Phylum: Arthropoda
- Clade: Pancrustacea
- Class: Insecta
- Order: Hemiptera
- Suborder: Auchenorrhyncha
- Family: Cicadidae
- Subtribe: Tacuina
- Genus: Cacama
- Species: C. valvata

Binomial name
- Cacama valvata (Uhler, 1888)

= Cacama valvata =

Species of true bug

Cacama valvata, also known as the common cactus dodger, is a species of cicada in the family Cicadidae. It is found in Central America and North America.
