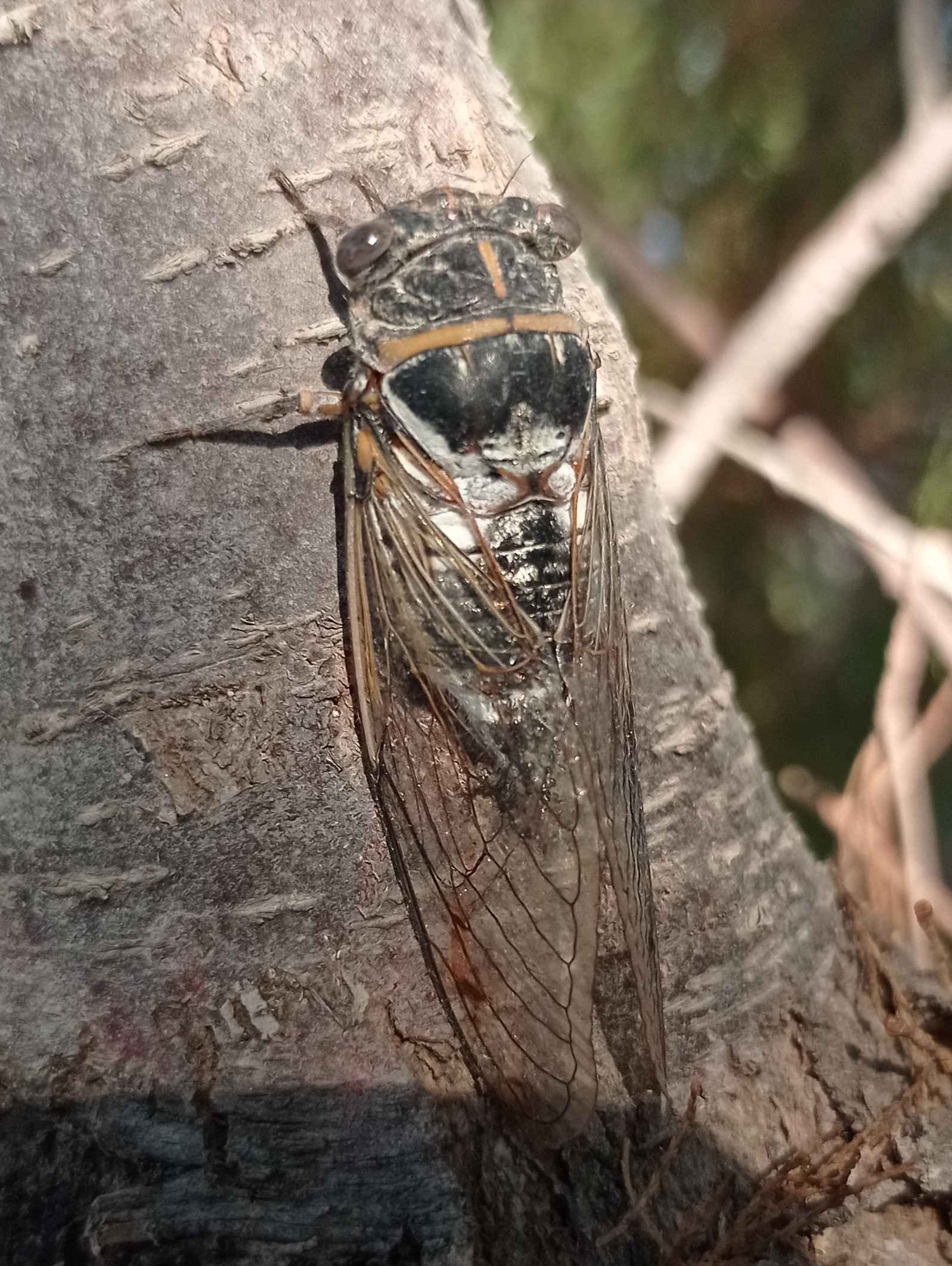

Scientific classification
- Kingdom: Animalia
- Phylum: Arthropoda
- Clade: Pancrustacea
- Class: Insecta
- Order: Hemiptera
- Suborder: Auchenorrhyncha
- Family: Cicadidae
- Genus: Lyristes
- Species: L. gemellus

Binomial name
- Lyristes gemellus Boulard, 1988

= Lyristes gemellus =

Species of cicada

Lyristes gemellus, commonly known as the geminate cicada, is a species of true cicada native to the Southeastern coast of Turkey. It has also been observed in Cyprus, and the Southwestern islands of Greece.

Lyristes gemellus is part of a complex of species also containing Lyristes isodol and Lyristes plebejus. These three species can only be distinguished by the males' acoustic signals, as they are near identical morphologically.

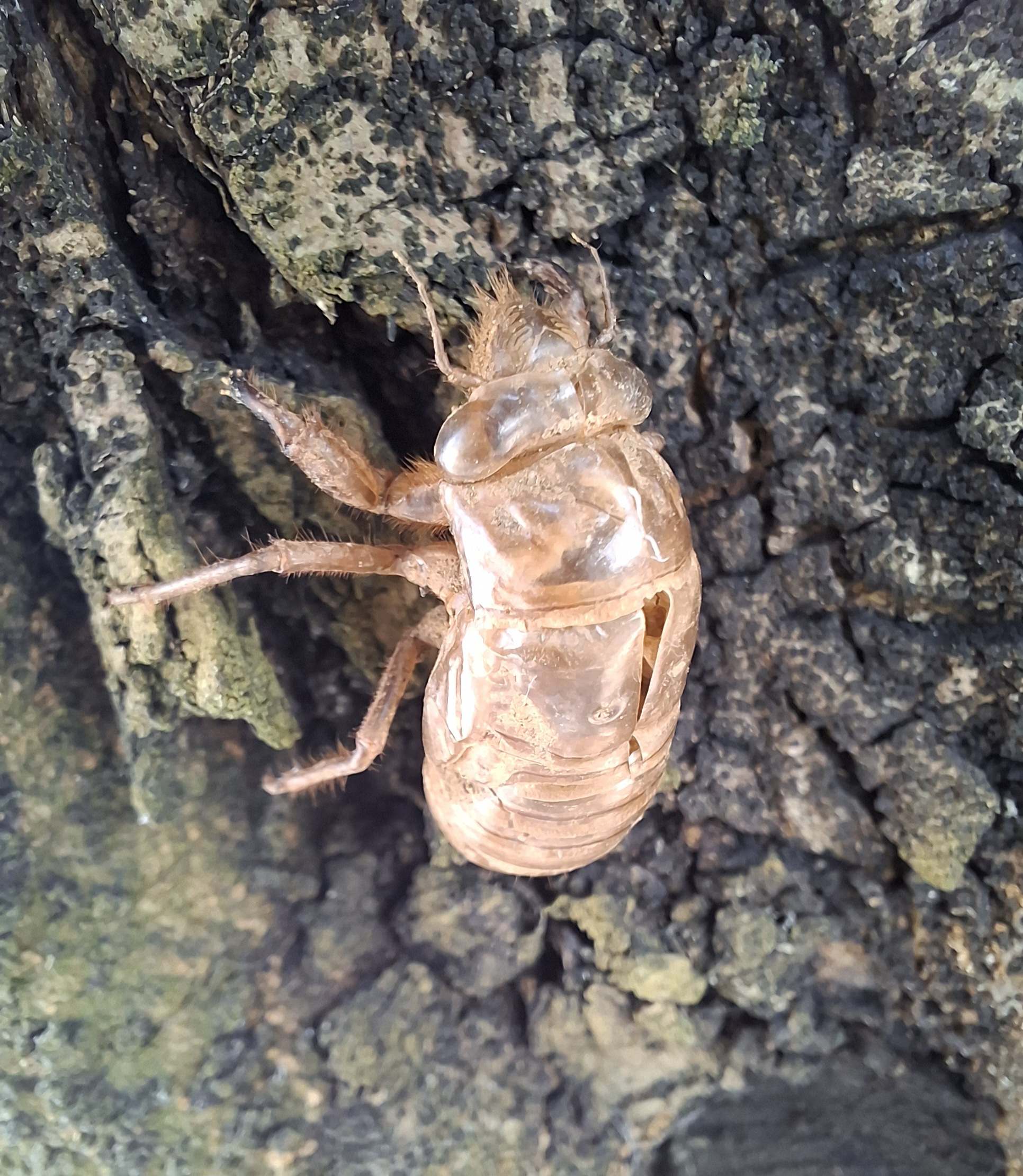
Lyristes gemellus exuvia
