= Cacama longirostris =

Scientific classification
- Kingdom: Animalia
- Phylum: Arthropoda
- Clade: Pancrustacea
- Class: Insecta
- Order: Hemiptera
- Suborder: Auchenorrhyncha
- Family: Cicadidae
- Genus: Cacama
- Species: C. longirostris

Binomial name
- Cacama longirostris (Distant, 1881)

Species of true bug

Cacama longirostris is a species of cicada in the family Cicadidae. It is found in Central America.
