= Hadoa longiopercula =

Scientific classification
- Kingdom: Animalia
- Phylum: Arthropoda
- Clade: Pancrustacea
- Class: Insecta
- Order: Hemiptera
- Suborder: Auchenorrhyncha
- Family: Cicadidae
- Genus: Hadoa
- Species: H. longiopercula

Binomial name
- Hadoa longiopercula (Davis, 1926)

Synonyms
- Tibicen longioperculus Davis, 1926

Species of true bug

Hadoa longiopercula is a species of annual cicada in the genus Hadoa. It is native to the U.S. state of Arizona where it inhabits desert scrub. It has been found in the south eastern corner of the state near Alligator Junipers.

.
