= Cacama carbonaria =

Scientific classification
- Kingdom: Animalia
- Phylum: Arthropoda
- Clade: Pancrustacea
- Class: Insecta
- Order: Hemiptera
- Suborder: Auchenorrhyncha
- Family: Cicadidae
- Genus: Cacama
- Species: C. carbonaria

Binomial name
- Cacama carbonaria Davis, 1919

Species of true bug

Cacama carbonaria is a species of cicada in the family Cicadidae. It lives in Central America.
