= Cornuplura nigroalbata =

Scientific classification
- Kingdom: Animalia
- Phylum: Arthropoda
- Clade: Pancrustacea
- Class: Insecta
- Order: Hemiptera
- Suborder: Auchenorrhyncha
- Family: Cicadidae
- Subfamily: Cicadinae
- Genus: Cornuplura
- Species: C. nigroalbata

Binomial name
- Cornuplura nigroalbata (Davis, 1936)

Synonyms
- Tibicen nigroalbata Davis, 1936

Species of true bug

Cornuplura nigroalbata is a species of cicada in the family Cicadidae. It is found in Central America and North America.
