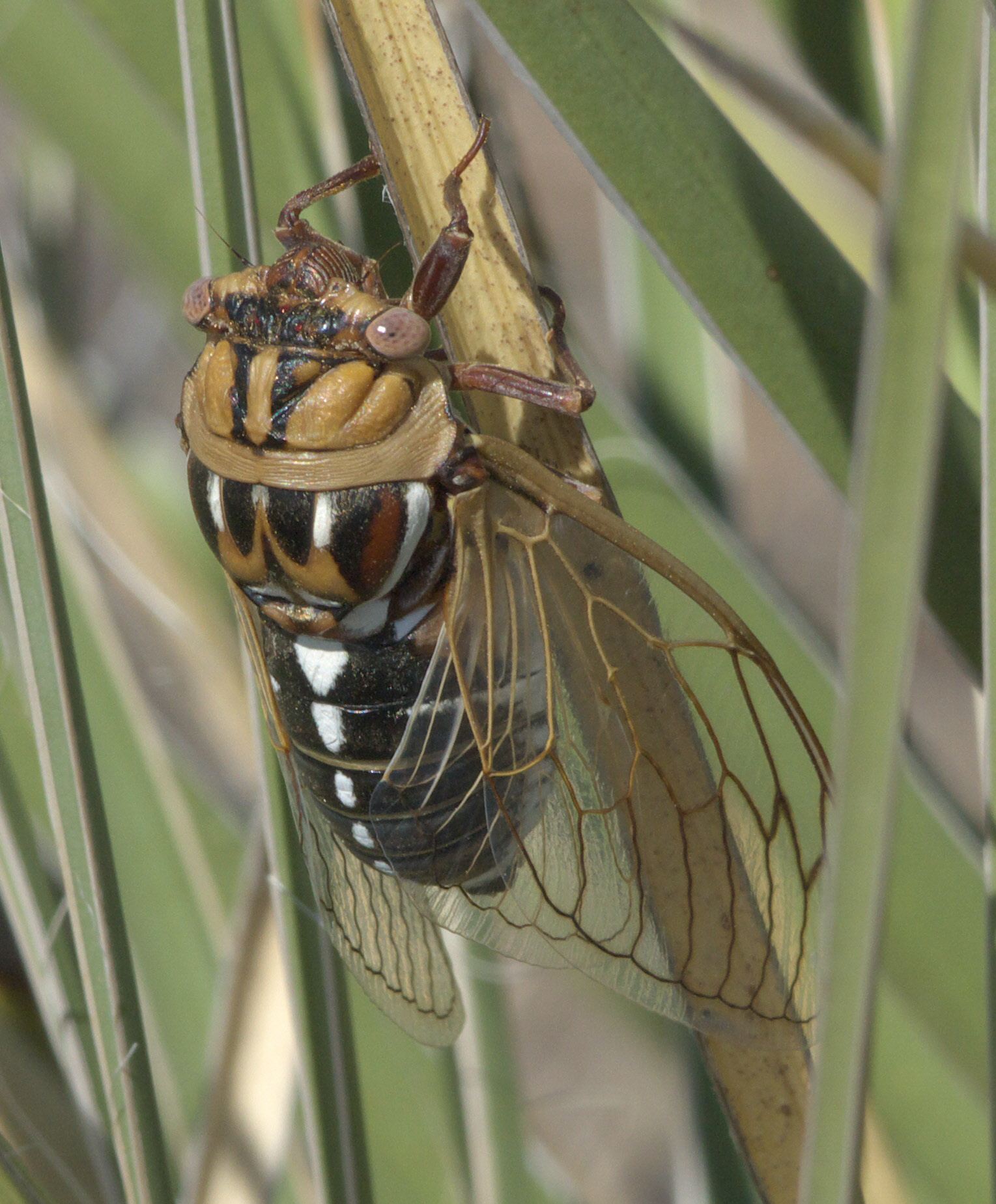

Scientific classification
- Kingdom: Animalia
- Phylum: Arthropoda
- Clade: Pancrustacea
- Class: Insecta
- Order: Hemiptera
- Suborder: Auchenorrhyncha
- Family: Cicadidae
- Genus: Megatibicen
- Species: M. tremulus

Binomial name
- Megatibicen tremulus (Cole, 2008)

= Megatibicen tremulus =

Species of true bug

Megatibicen tremulus, known generally as the western bush cicada or Cole's bush cicada, is a species of cicada in the family Cicadidae. It is found in the Great Plains of the United States, often associated with Sagebrush.

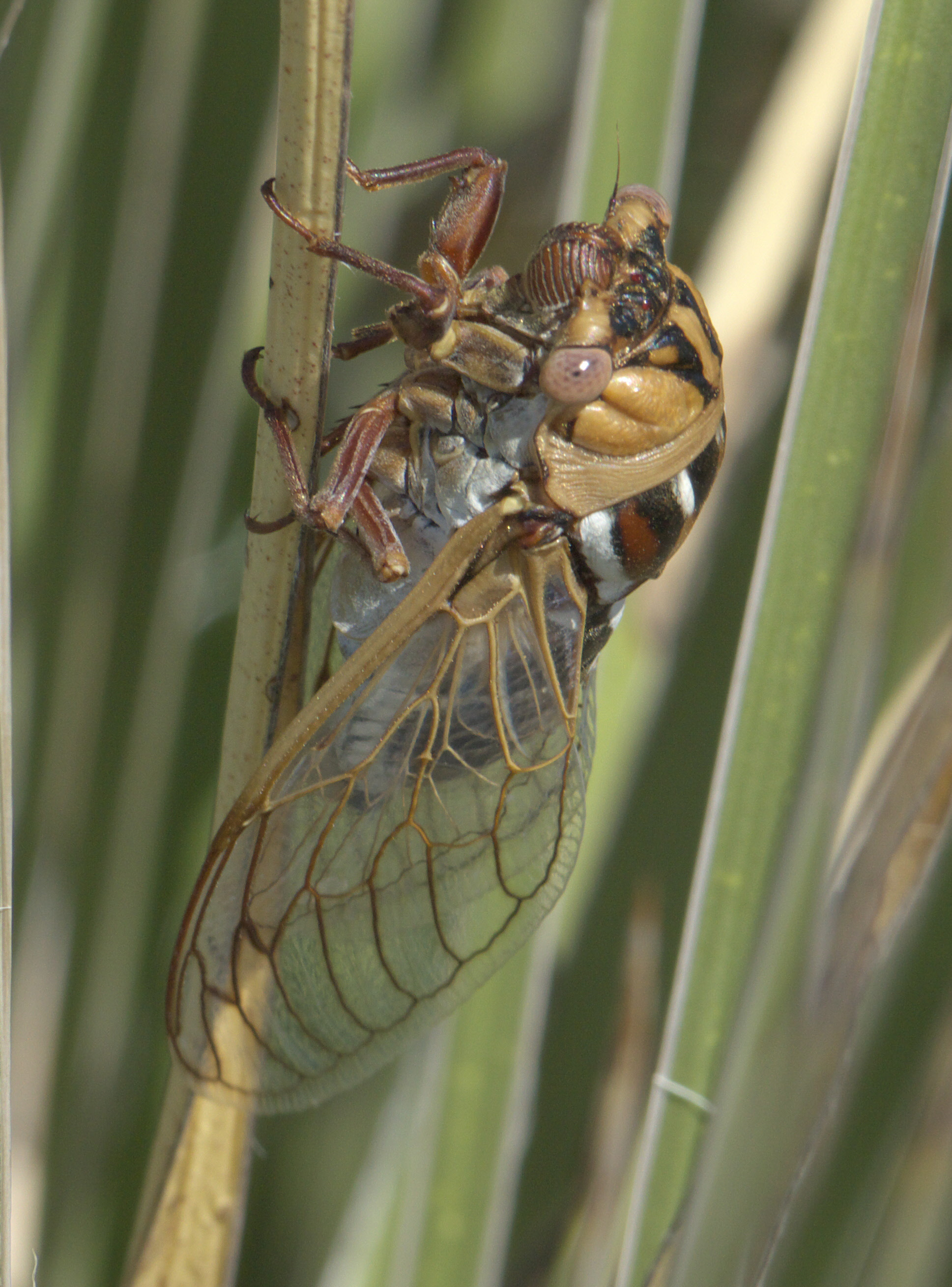
Western bush cicada, Megatibicen tremulus
