= Tibicen =

Former genus of cicadas

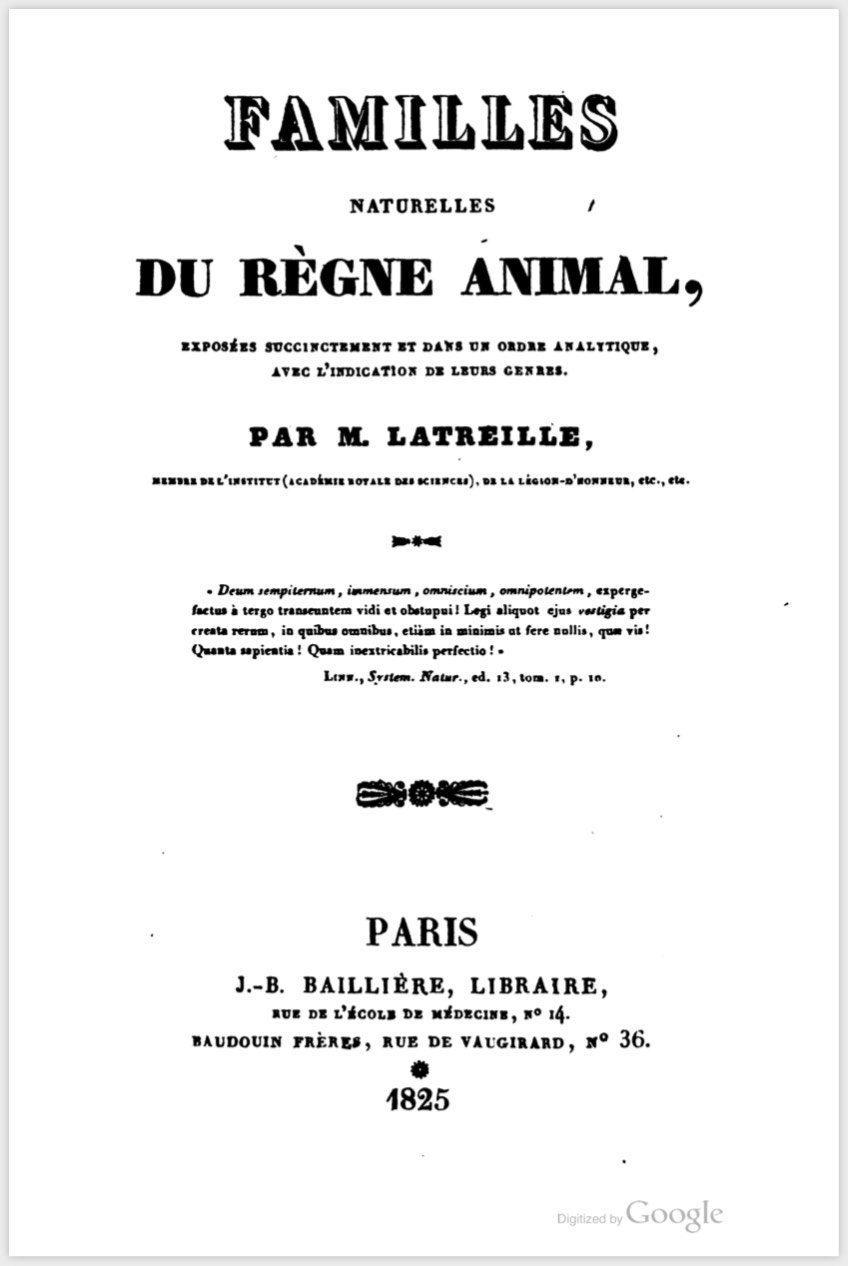
Latreille, 1825, front page

Tibicen is a former genus name in the insect family Cicadidae (order Hemiptera) that was originally published by P. A. Latreille in 1825 and formally made available in a translation by A. A. Berthold in 1827. The name was placed on the Official Index of Rejected and Invalid Generic Names in Zoology by the International Commission on Zoological Nomenclature in 2021. Cicada species (all from Europe) that were included by some authors in this genus at the time of its suppression are now listed under genus Lyristes Horváth, 1926. Other formerly-Tibicen species are currently placed in the tribe Tacuini Distant, 1904 and include the genera Auritibicen Lee, 2015, Hadoa Moulds, 2015 Megatibicen Sanborn and Heath, 2016, and Neotibicen Hill and Moulds, 2015.

For nearly a century after its 1825 appearance in the literature, Tibicen was rarely referenced. Usage increased in the early 1900s when influential authors such as G. W. Kirkaldy and E. P. Van Duzee began applying the name to a group of prominent North American cicadas currently in the subfamily Cicadinae and tribe Cryptotympanini. By 2015, more than 100 cicada species and subspecies were included in genus Tibicen, from around the Northern Hemisphere.

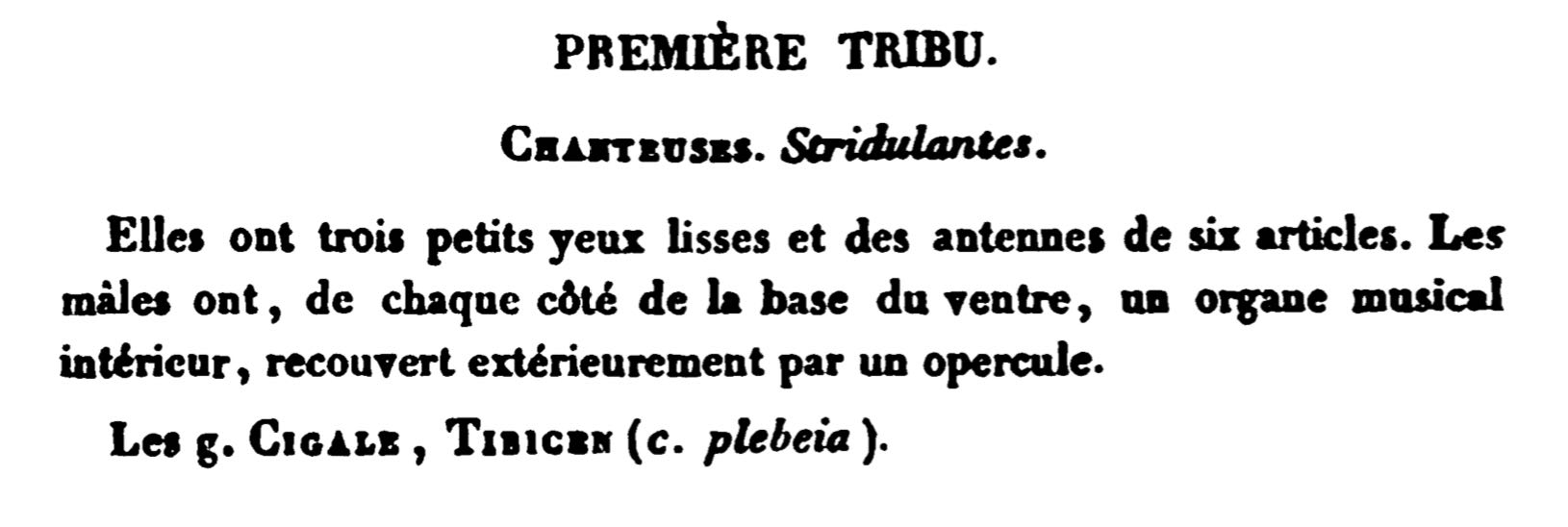
First literature reference to genus Tibicen, in Latreille, 1825, p. 426

During the 20th century, Tibicen became a source of controversy and confusion in cicada nomenclature. Some argued that neither Latreille's original description nor its Berthold translation met the requirements of the International Code of Zoological Nomenclature. Both works listed the new genus name with no description, immediately followed by the species "c. plebeia" or "Cicada plebeia", without authorship. This indication has often been taken to refer to Cicada plebeja Scopoli, 1763 (a European species now in subfamily Cicadinae), although a different Cicada plebeja might have been intended, a Cicadinae species defined by Linnaeus in 1767. Acceptance of the argument that neither Latreille's nor Berthold's publication made the name available to nomenclature would lead to the conclusion that Tibicen was correctly founded on a later publication of the name, one also authored by Latreille (1829) but based on a different Scopoli species, Cicada haematodes Scopoli, 1763 (a cicada now in subfamily Tibicininae). Disagreement over the nomenclatural validity of Tibicen Berthold, 1827 (or Latreille, 1825) versus Tibicen Latreille, 1829 meant that the genus name as well as the family group names based upon it (e.g., Tibiceninae) held different biological meanings depending on the author's opinion of the correct type species. Furthermore, since the stem of the name Tibicen differs by just one letter from that of the cicada genus Tibicina Kolenati, 1857, for which Cicada haematodes Scopoli was also assigned type status, additional confusion was created by different authors misspelling the involved generic and family group names.

In 1984, Melville and Sims petitioned the International Commission on Zoological Nomenclature to alleviate the longstanding confusion within cicada taxonomy by suppressing the generic name Tibicen Berthold, 1827 for the purposes of the Principle of Priority (Case 239). This change would eliminate the problem of higher level taxa with similar spellings and allow the cicadas allied with Cicada plebeja Scopoli, 1763 at the genus level to be included under an unambiguously defined junior name, Lyristes Horváth, a synonym which had been created in 1926.

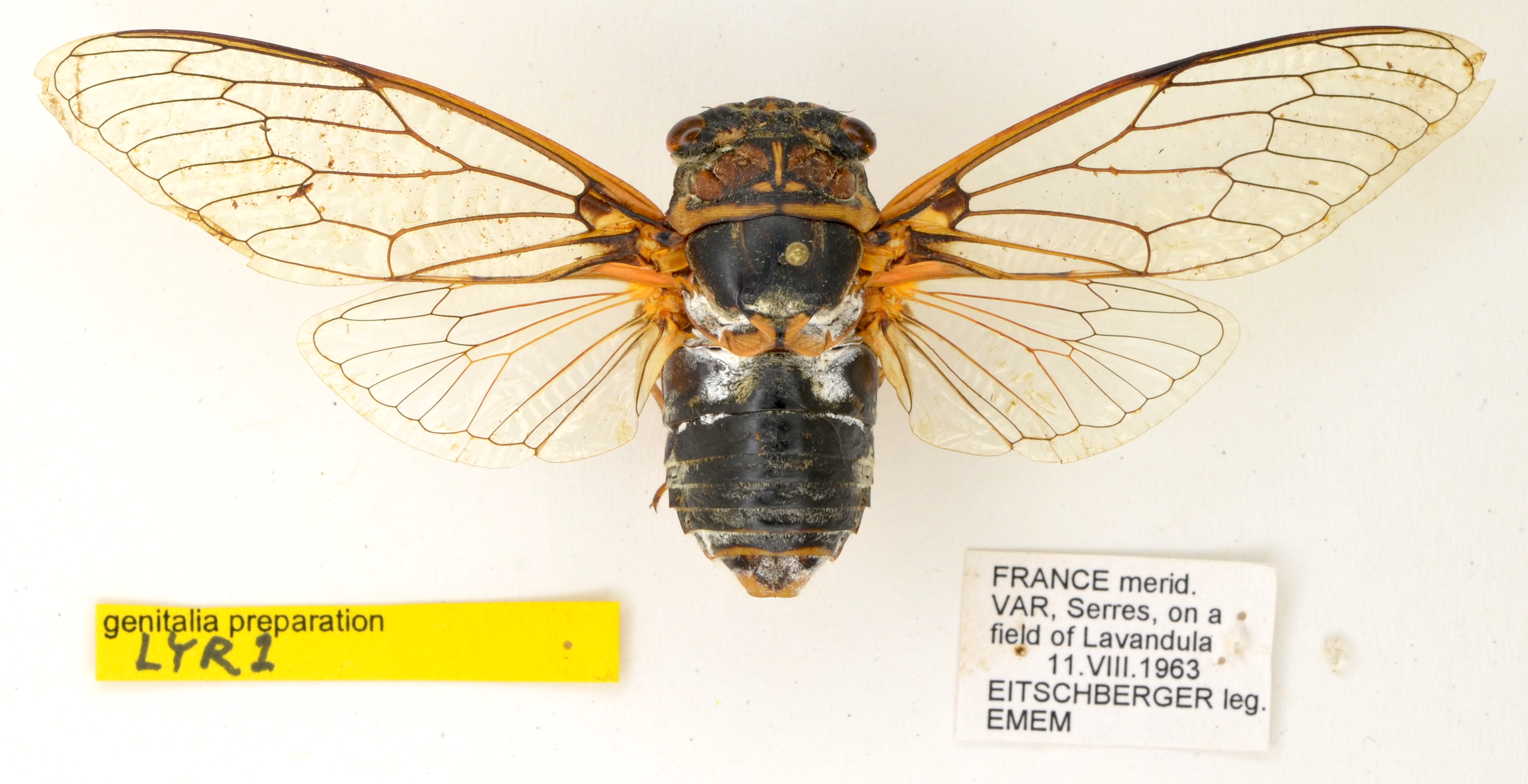
Lyristes plebejus (Scopoli, 1763), a European cicada regarded as the type species of the former genus Tibicen

Several decades passed before the Commission responded to the Melville and Sims petition. In 2014, several authors renewed the push to resolve the Tibicen question, albeit with differing opinions as to the validity of the original 1825/1827 definition of the name. Finally, in 2021, the Commission issued Opinion 2475 which suppressed the generic name Tibicen Berthold, 1827 for the purposes of the Principle of Priority and placed it on the Official Index of Rejected and Invalid Generic Names in Zoology. This decision was facilitated by the prior removal to new genera of all formerly Tibicen species from Asia and the Americas, prompted in part by new molecular genetic data. Because related cicadas in the European species group were already included under Lyristes by many authors, suppression of the name Tibicen also conserved current usage.

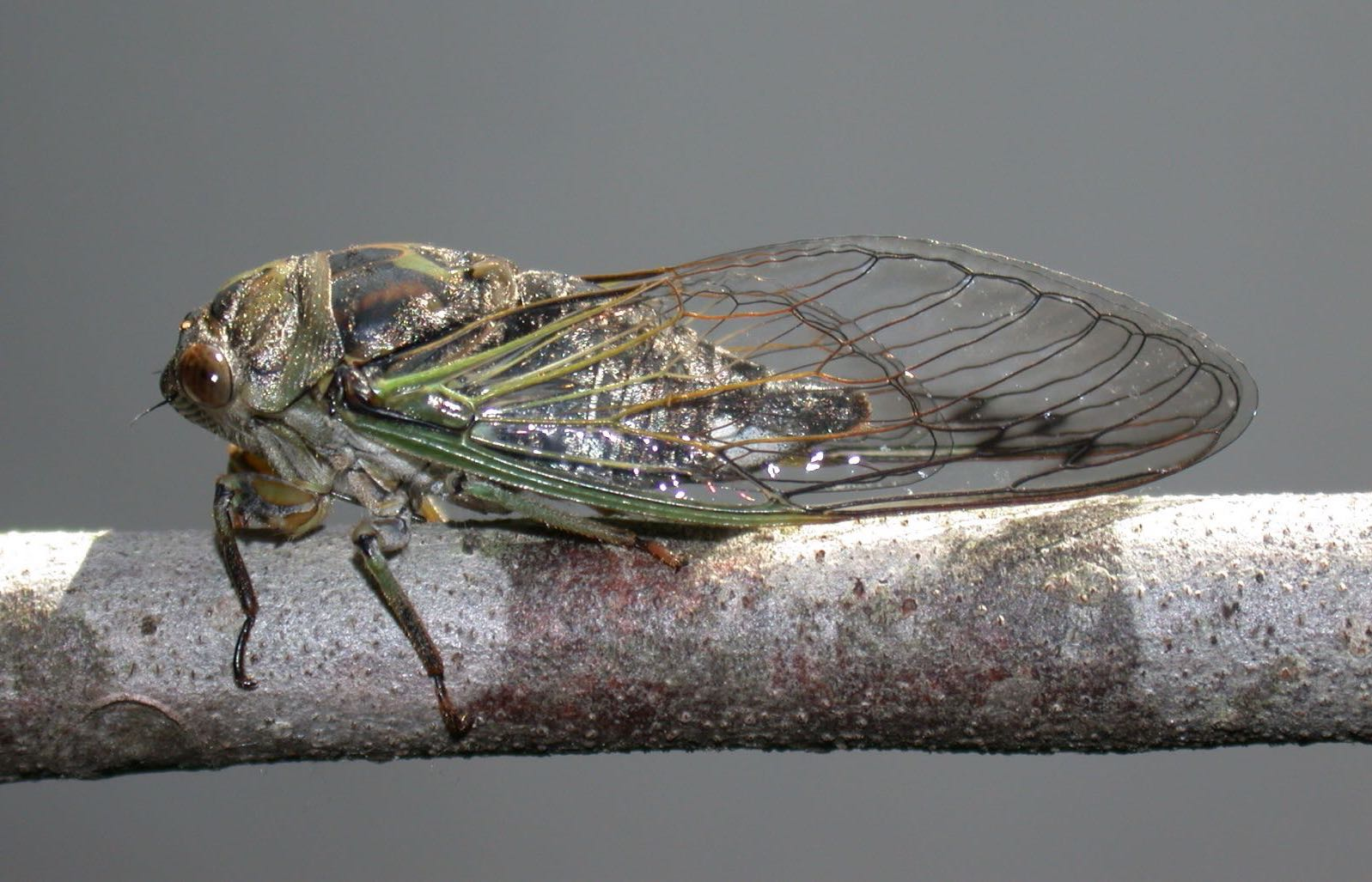
Neotibicen canicularis, the "Dog-day cicada" of North America and the type species of the genus Neotibicen. Until 2015, this species was included in genus Tibicen

As an officially rejected name, Tibicen is now an item of history. All species associated at the generic level with its type species are currently listed under genus Lyristes Horváth, 1926. The family group names based on Tibicen – namely Tibicenina (subtribe), Tibicenini (tribe), Tibiceninae (subfamily), Tibicenidae (family), and Tibicenoidea (superfamily) – are also no longer available for use (Article 39, Code of Zoological Nomenclature). Tibicenini, which was named by Distant (1889), previously held date priority as the oldest name for the current tribal concept that includes Cicada plebeja Scopoli. This group is still sometimes referred to with the name Cryptotympanini Handlirsch, 1925, although the rules of nomenclature indicate that Tacuini Distant, 1904 has priority.

Echoes of the historical genus name Tibicen remain in recently erected genera that contain many of its former members – Auritibicen Lee (Asia), Megatibicen Sanborn & Heath (North America), and Neotibicen Hill & Moulds (North America), as well as in the synonymic genera Ameritibicen Lee, Gigatibicen Lee, and Paratibicen Lee.
