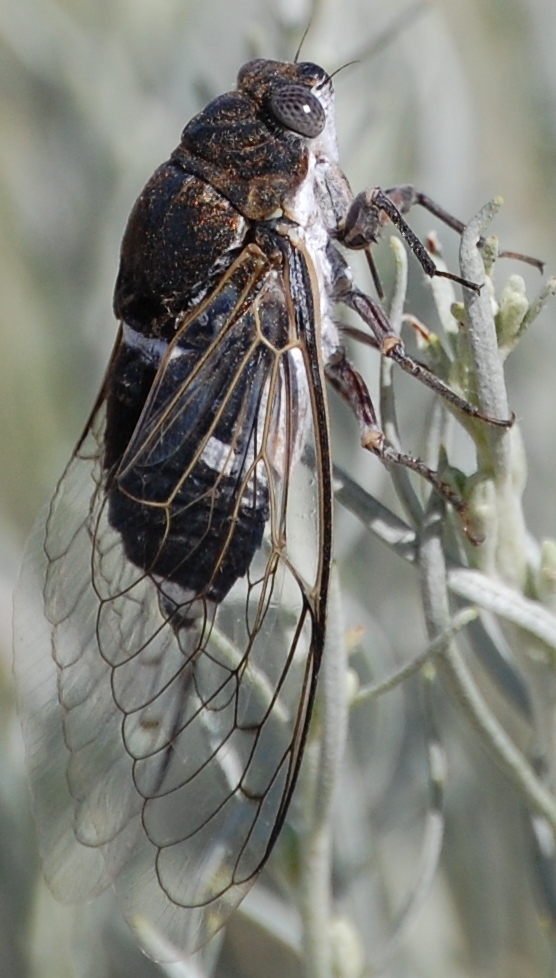

Scientific classification
- Kingdom: Animalia
- Phylum: Arthropoda
- Clade: Pancrustacea
- Class: Insecta
- Order: Hemiptera
- Suborder: Auchenorrhyncha
- Family: Cicadidae
- Subtribe: Tacuina
- Genus: Cacama; Distant, 1904

= Cacama (cicada) =

Genus of true bugs

Cacama is a genus of cicadas in the family Cicadidae commonly known as cactus dodgers. There are about 12 described species in Cacama.

== Species ==
These 12 species belong to the genus Cacama:

- Cacama californica Davis, 1919^{i c g b}
- Cacama carbonaria Davis, 1919^{i c g b}
- Cacama collinaplaga Sanborn & Heath in Sanborn, Heath, Phillips & Heath, 2011^{i c g b}
- Cacama crepitans (Van Duzee, 1914)^{i c g b}
- Cacama dissimilis (Distant, 1881)^{i c g b}
- Cacama furcata Davis, 1919^{i c g b}
- Cacama longirostris (Distant, 1881)^{i c g b}
- Cacama maura (Distant, 1881)^{i c g b}
- Cacama moorei Sanborn & Heath in Sanborn, Heath, Phillips & Heath, 2011^{i c g b} (Moore's cactus dodger)
- Cacama pygmaea Sanborn in Sanborn, Heath, Phillips & Heath, 2011^{i c g b}
- Cacama valvata (Uhler, 1888)^{i c g b} (common cactus dodger)
- Cacama variegata Davis, 1919^{i c g b} (variegated cactus dodger)

Data sources: i = ITIS, c = Catalogue of Life, g = GBIF, b = Bugguide.net
