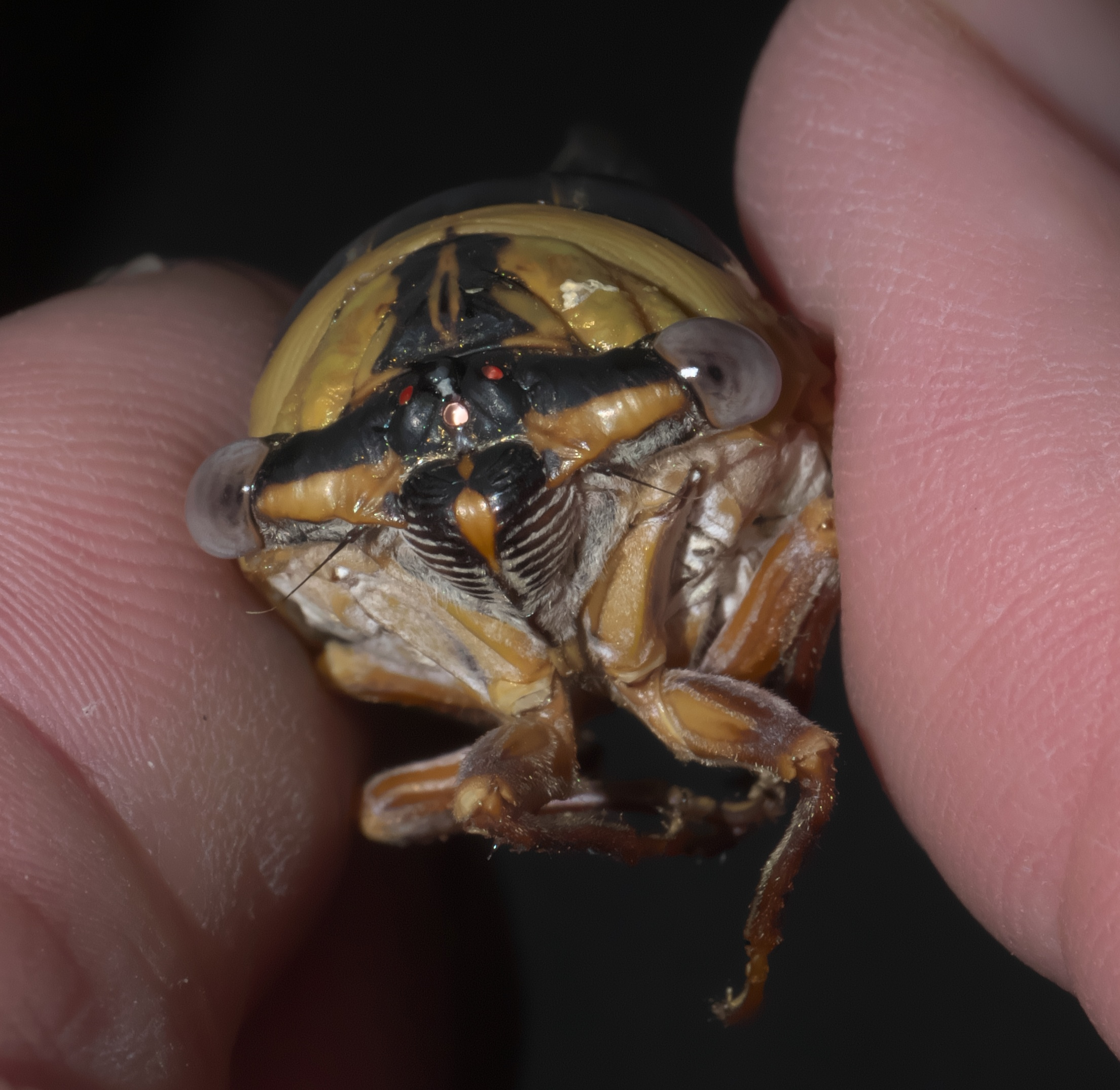

Scientific classification
- Kingdom: Animalia
- Phylum: Arthropoda
- Clade: Pancrustacea
- Class: Insecta
- Order: Hemiptera
- Suborder: Auchenorrhyncha
- Family: Cicadidae
- Genus: Megatibicen
- Species: M. pronotalis

Binomial name
- Megatibicen pronotalis (Davis & W.T., 1938)

= Megatibicen pronotalis =

Species of true bug

Megatibicen pronotalis, or Walker's cicada, is a species of cicada in the family Cicadidae. It is found in the northern Great Plains of the United States.

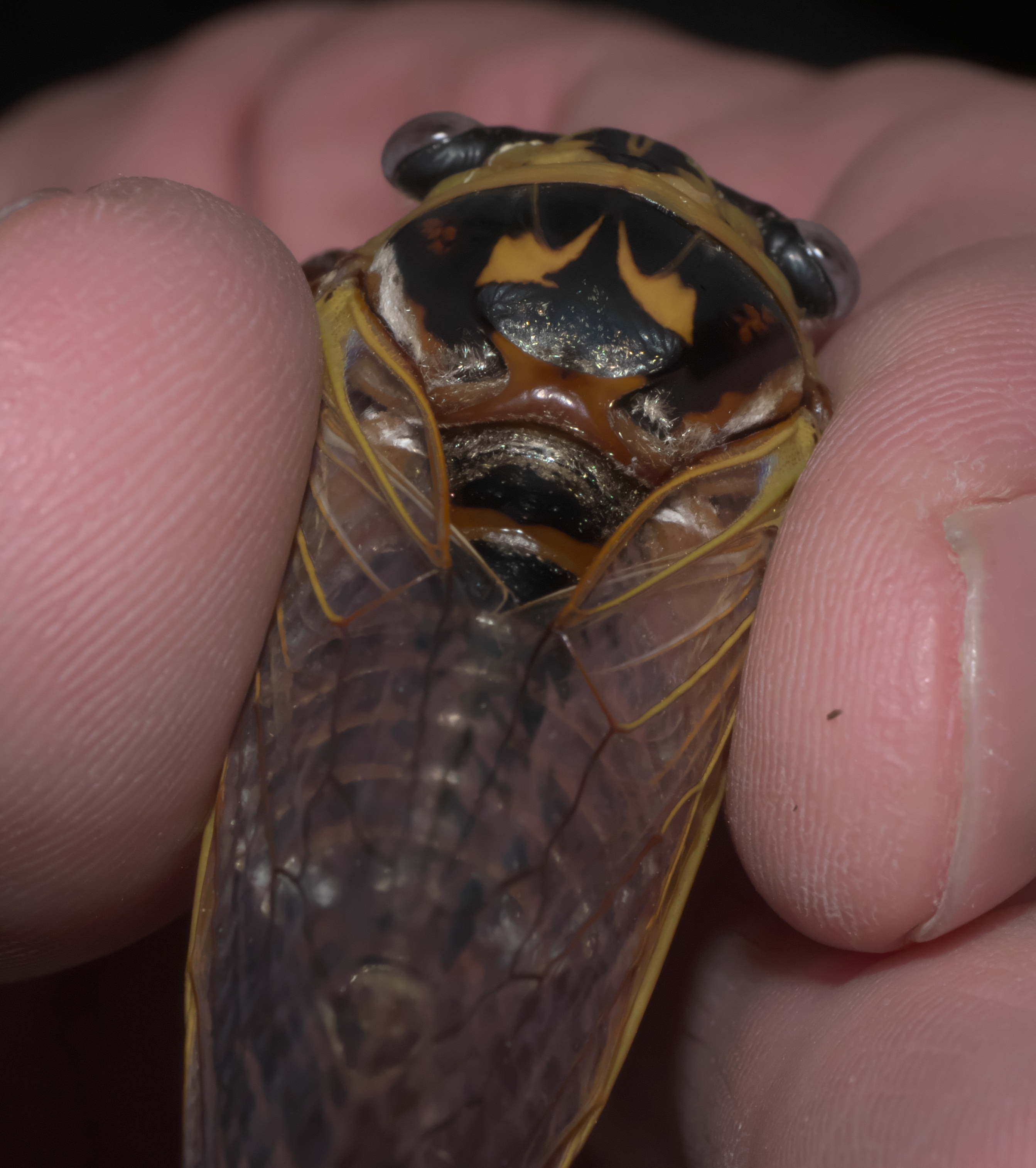
Walker's cicada, Megatibicen pronotalis

== Notes ==
M. pronotalis is often associated with riparian Populus and Salix. It is reportedly among the loudest insects in the world.
