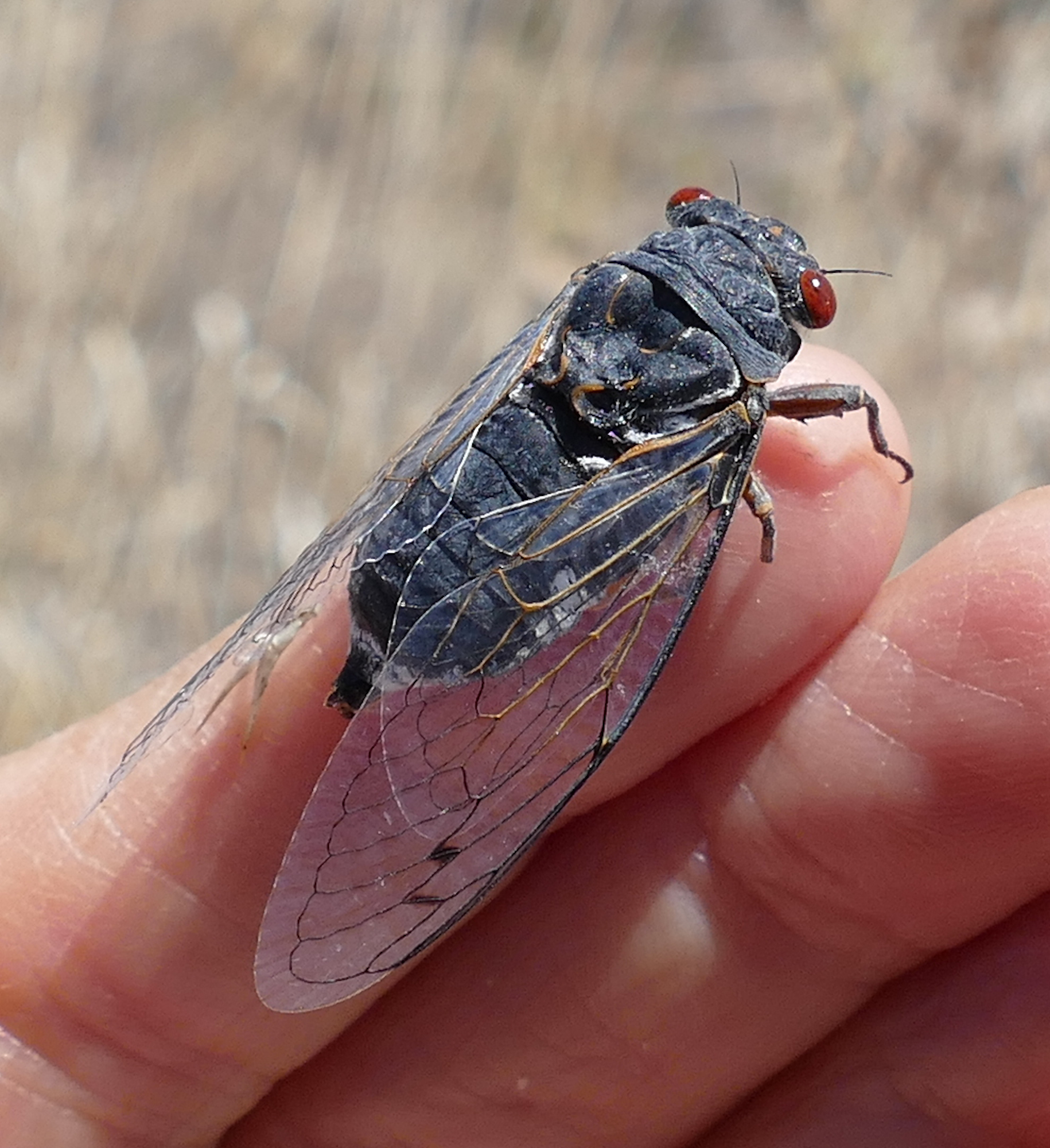
- Hadoa chiricahua

Scientific classification
- Kingdom: Animalia
- Phylum: Arthropoda
- Clade: Pancrustacea
- Class: Insecta
- Order: Hemiptera
- Suborder: Auchenorrhyncha
- Family: Cicadidae
- Genus: Hadoa
- Species: H. chiricahua

Binomial name
- Hadoa chiricahua (Davis, 1923)

Synonyms
- Tibicen chiricahua Davis, 1923

= Hadoa chiricahua =

Species of true bug

Hadoa chiricahua is a species of annual cicada in the genus Hadoa. It is endemic to the U.S. states of Arizona and New Mexico.
