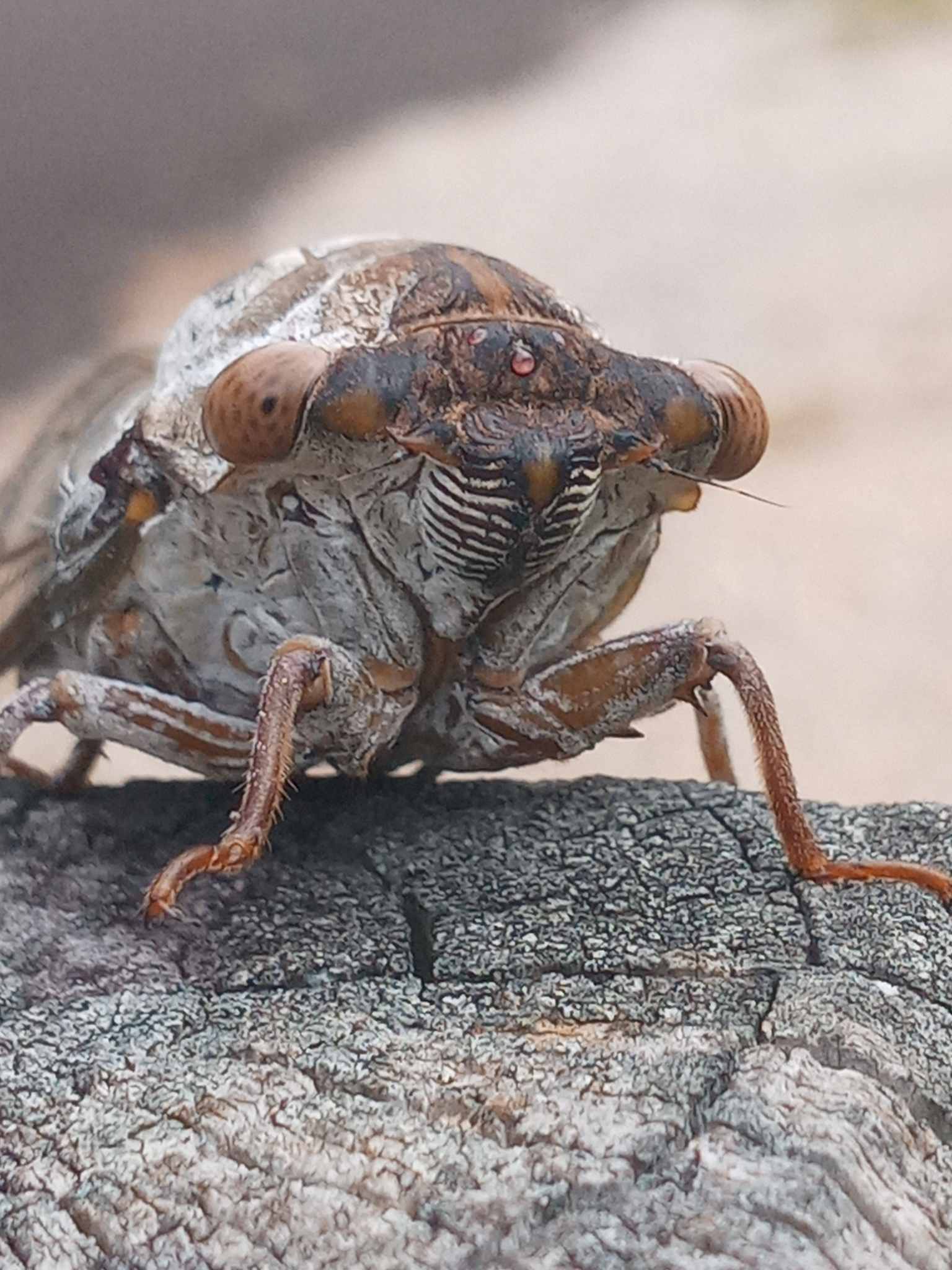
- Adult in Mississippi

Scientific classification
- Kingdom: Animalia
- Phylum: Arthropoda
- Clade: Pancrustacea
- Class: Insecta
- Order: Hemiptera
- Suborder: Auchenorrhyncha
- Family: Cicadidae
- Genus: Megatibicen
- Species: M. grossus

Binomial name
- Megatibicen grossus (Germar, 1834)

Synonyms
- Synonymy: Tettigonia grossa; Tibicen auletes; Neotibicen auletes; Megatibicen auletes

= Megatibicen grossus =

Species of true bug

Megatibicen grossus, formerly Megatibicen auletes, commonly called the northern dusk-singing cicada, giant oak cicada, or southern oak cicada, is a species of cicada in the family Cicadidae. It is found in the eastern United States and portions of southeastern Canada.

== Notes ==
M. grossus is the largest cicada species in North America north of Mexico. It is associated with oak trees.
