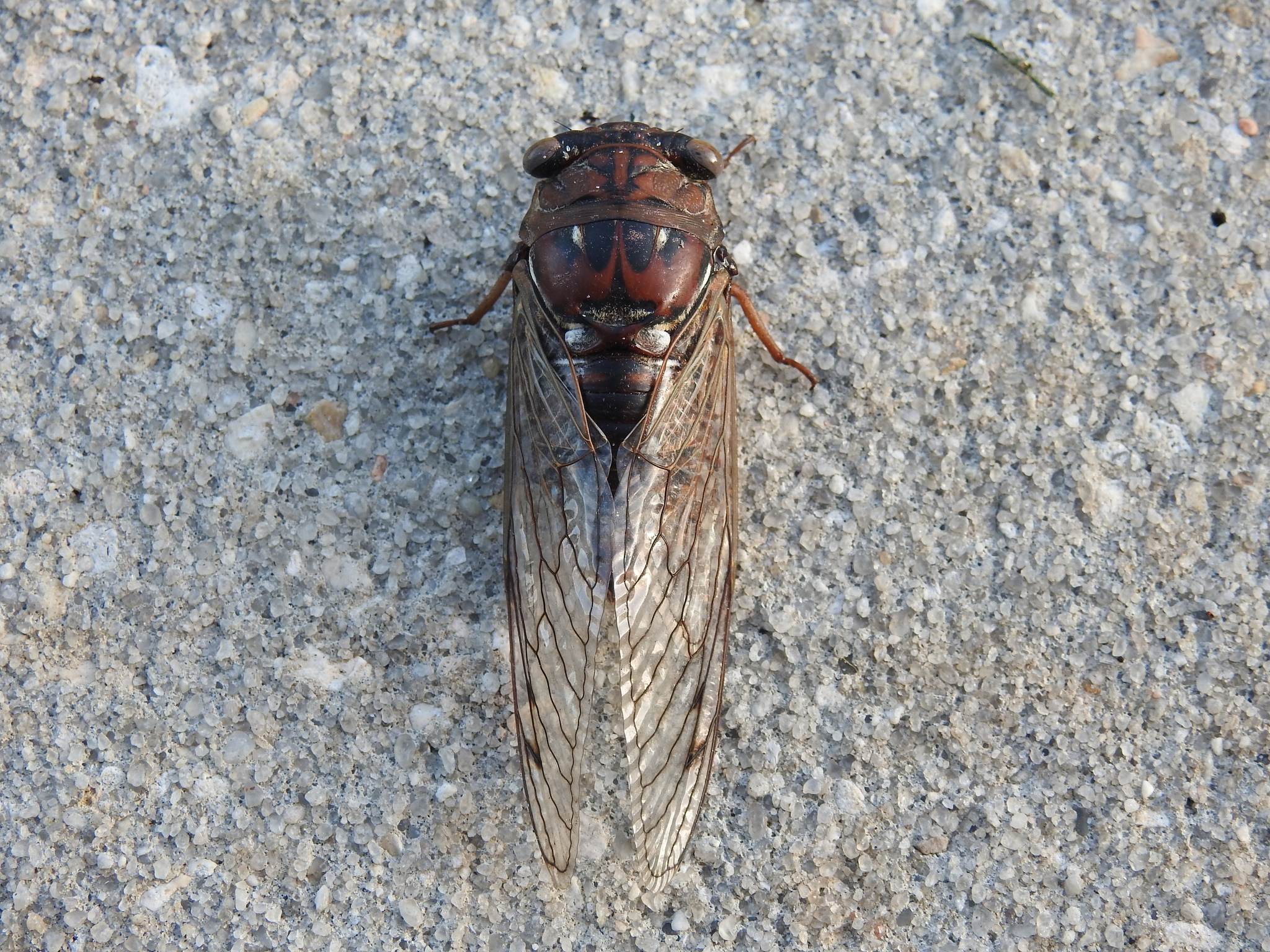

Scientific classification
- Kingdom: Animalia
- Phylum: Arthropoda
- Clade: Pancrustacea
- Class: Insecta
- Order: Hemiptera
- Suborder: Auchenorrhyncha
- Family: Cicadidae
- Genus: Megatibicen
- Species: M. resonans

Binomial name
- Megatibicen resonans (Walker, 1850)

Synonyms
- Tibicen resonans Walker, 1850; Neotibicen resonans

= Megatibicen resonans =

Species of true bug

Megatibicen resonans, commonly called resonant cicada or southern pine barrens cicada, is a species of annual cicada in the genus Megatibicen. Prior to its reclassification to the genus Megatibicen, M. resonans was included in the genus Neotibicen.
