= Hadoa chisosensis =

Scientific classification
- Kingdom: Animalia
- Phylum: Arthropoda
- Clade: Pancrustacea
- Class: Insecta
- Order: Hemiptera
- Suborder: Auchenorrhyncha
- Family: Cicadidae
- Genus: Hadoa
- Species: H. chisosensis

Binomial name
- Hadoa chisosensis (Davis, 1934)

Synonyms
- Tibicen chisosensis Davis, 1934

Species of true bug

Hadoa chisosensis is a species of annual cicada in the genus Hadoa. It is native to the U.S. state of Texas.
