= Megatibicen figuratus =

Scientific classification
- Kingdom: Animalia
- Phylum: Arthropoda
- Clade: Pancrustacea
- Class: Insecta
- Order: Hemiptera
- Suborder: Auchenorrhyncha
- Family: Cicadidae
- Genus: Megatibicen
- Species: M. figuratus

Binomial name
- Megatibicen figuratus (Walker, 1858)

Synonyms
- Tibicen figuratus Walker, 1858; Neotibicen figuratus

Species of true bug

Megatibicen figuratus, commonly called the fall southeastern dusk-singing cicada, is a species of annual cicada in the genus Megatibicen. Prior to its reclassification to the genus Megatibicen, M. figuratus was included in the genus Neotibicen.
