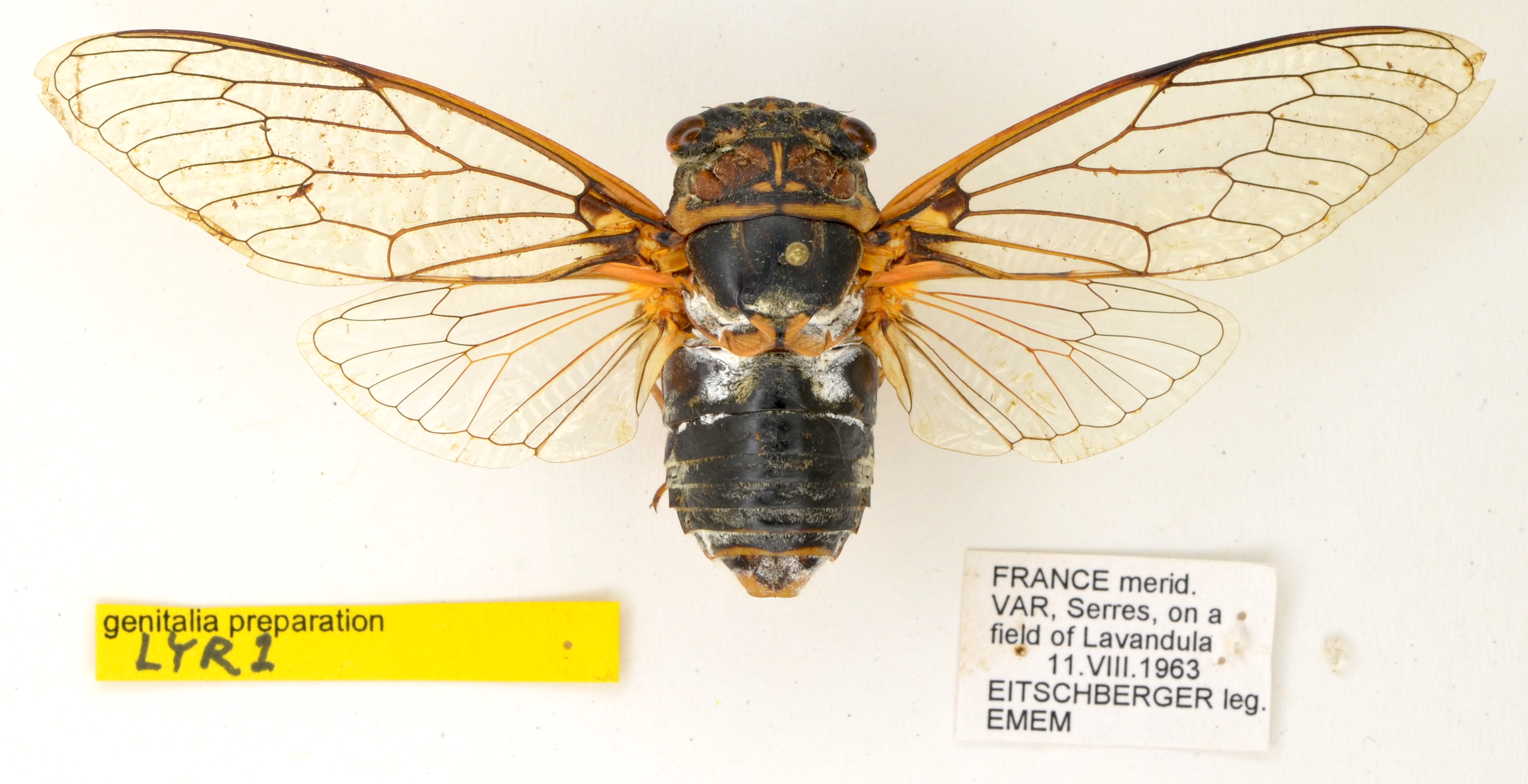

Scientific classification
- Domain: Eukaryota
- Kingdom: Animalia
- Phylum: Arthropoda
- Class: Insecta
- Order: Hemiptera
- Suborder: Auchenorrhyncha
- Family: Cicadidae
- Tribe: Cryptotympanini
- Genus: Lyristes; Horvath, 1926

Type species
- Lyristes plebejus (Scopoli, 1763)

Synonyms
- List: Cicada (Tibicen) Berthold, 1827; Liristes Horváth, 1926; Lyrastes Horváth, 1926; Lyrises Horváth, 1926; Lyriste Horváth, 1926; Lyristis Horváth, 1926; Lyrsistes Horváth, 1926; Lyrtistes Horváth, 1926; Tibcien Berthold, 1827; Tibicen Berthold, 1827; Tibicen Latreille, 1825; Tibicens Berthold, 1827; Tibiceus Berthold, 1827; Tibicien Berthold, 1827; Tibicim Berthold, 1827; Tibicin Berthold, 1827; Tivicen Berthold, 1827; Tribicen Berthold, 1827; Tubicen Berthold, 1827; Ueana (Tibicen) Berthold, 1827

= Lyristes =

Genus of cicada

Lyristes is a genus of cicadas from Europe and the Middle East. It was described by G. Horvath in 1926.

Many authors previously listed the species of Lyristes under genus Tibicen Berthold, 1827, which shares the same type species. However, in 2021, this senior objective synonym was placed on the Official Index of Rejected and Invalid Generic Names in Zoology by Opinion 2475 of the International Commission on Zoological Nomenclature.

Beginning in 2015, many American and Asian species were moved from this genus to create the new genera Auritibicen, Hadoa, Neotibicen, and Megatibicen, following molecular and morphological evidence.

== Species ==
The following extant species are recognised:

1. Lyristes armeniacus (Kolenati, 1857)
2. Lyristes esfandiarii (Dlabola, 1970)
3. Lyristes gemellus Boulard, 1988
4. Lyristes isodoi Boulard, 1988
5. Lyristes plebejus (Scopoli, 1763)

=== Fossil species ===
- †Lyristes emathion (Heer, 1853)
- †Lyristes renei Riou, 1995
