= Cornuplura =

Scientific classification
- Kingdom: Animalia
- Phylum: Arthropoda
- Clade: Pancrustacea
- Class: Insecta
- Order: Hemiptera
- Suborder: Auchenorrhyncha
- Family: Cicadidae
- Subfamily: Cicadinae
- Genus: Cornuplura; Davis, 1944

Genus of true bugs

Cornuplura is a genus of cicadas in the family Cicadidae. There are at least three described species in Cornuplura.

== Species ==
These three species belong to the genus Cornuplura:

- Cornuplura curvispinosa (Davis, 1936)
- Cornuplura nigroalbata (Davis, 1936)
- Cornuplura rudis (Walker, 1858)
