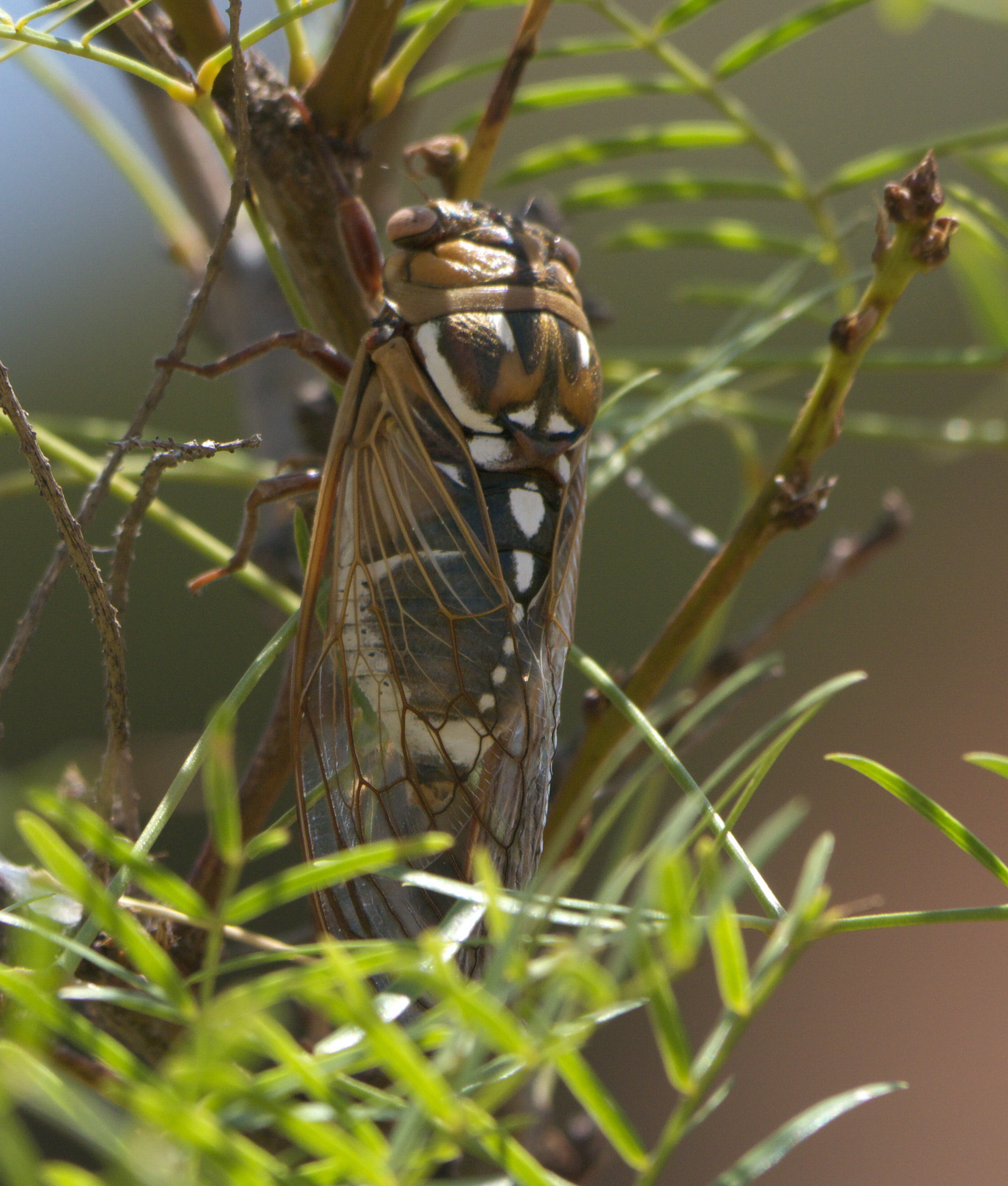
- Megatibicen dorsatus

Scientific classification
- Domain: Eukaryota
- Kingdom: Animalia
- Phylum: Arthropoda
- Class: Insecta
- Order: Hemiptera
- Suborder: Auchenorrhyncha
- Family: Cicadidae
- Tribe: Tacuini
- Subtribe: Tacuina
- Genus: Megatibicen; Sanborn & Heath, 2016

Synonyms
- Ameritibicen Lee, 2016; Gigatibicen Lee, 2016

= Megatibicen =

Genus of true bugs

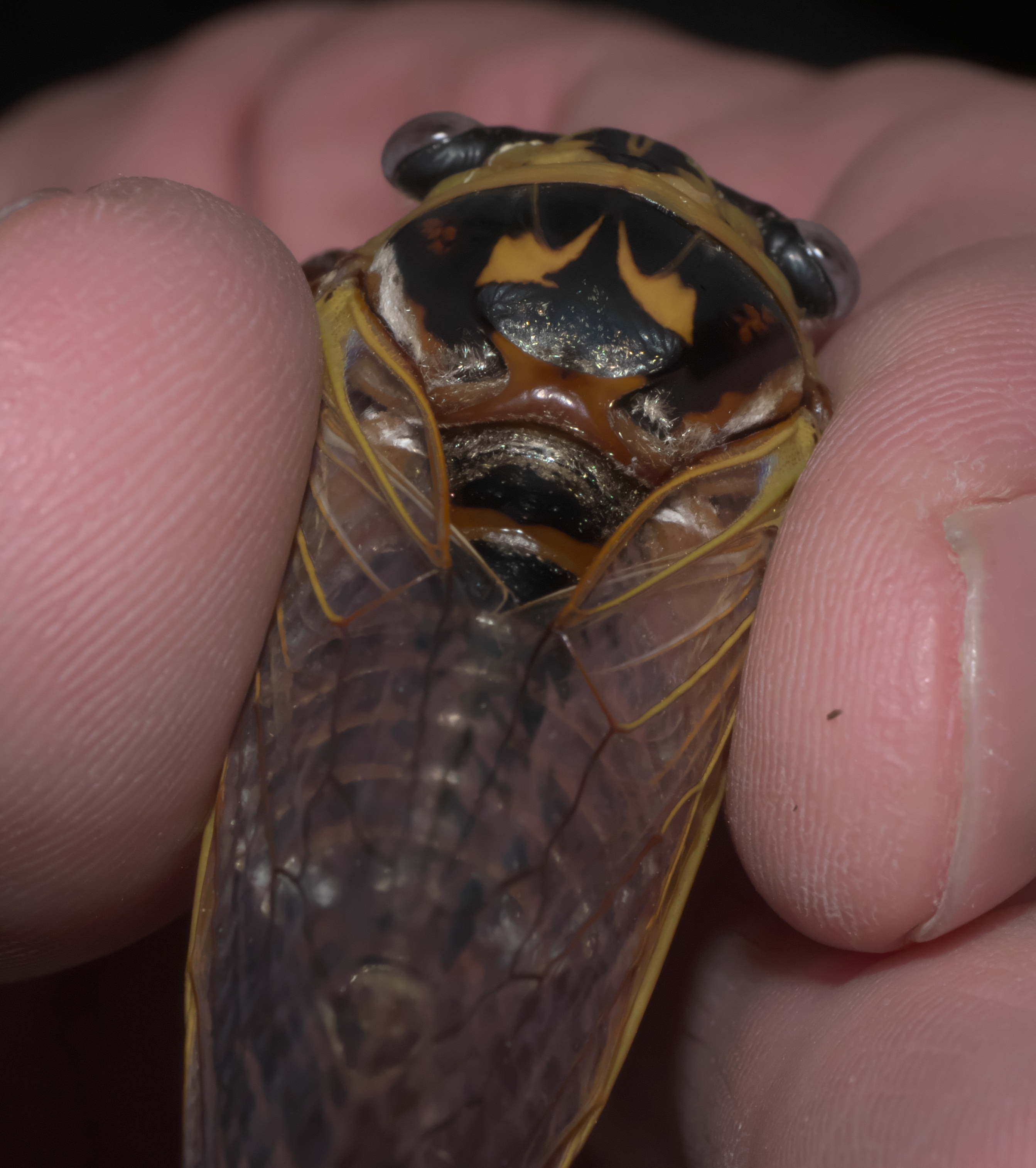
Megatibicen pronotalis

Megatibicen is a genus of North American cicadas in the tribe Tacuini, with about 10 described species. Until 2016, these species were included in the genus Tibicen (now genus Lyristes Horvath, 1926) and then briefly in Neotibicen. The species formerly of genera Ameritibicen Lee, 2016 and Gigatibicen Lee, 2016 are now considered species of Megatibicen Sanborn & Heath, 2016.

== Species ==
These species belong to the genus Megatibicen:

1. Megatibicen cultriformis (Davis & W.T., 1915)^{c g b} (grand western flood-plain cicada)
2. Megatibicen dealbatus (Davis & W.T., 1915)^{c g b} (plains harvest-fly)
3. Megatibicen dorsatus (Say, 1825)^{c g b} (bush cicada)
4. Megatibicen figuratus (Walker & F., 1858)^{c g b} (fall southeastern dusk-singing cicada)
5. Megatibicen grossus (Germar, 1834)^{c g b} (northern dusk-singing cicada)
6. Megatibicen harenosus Cole, 2017^{c g b}
7. Megatibicen pronotalis (Davis & W.T., 1938)^{c g b} (Walker's cicada)
8. Megatibicen resh (Haldeman, 1852)^{c g b}
9. Megatibicen resonans (Walker & F., 1850)^{c g b} (southern resonant cicada)
10. Megatibicen tremulus (Cole, 2008)^{c g b} (western bush cicada)

Data sources: i = ITIS, c = Catalogue of Life, g = GBIF, b = Bugguide.net
