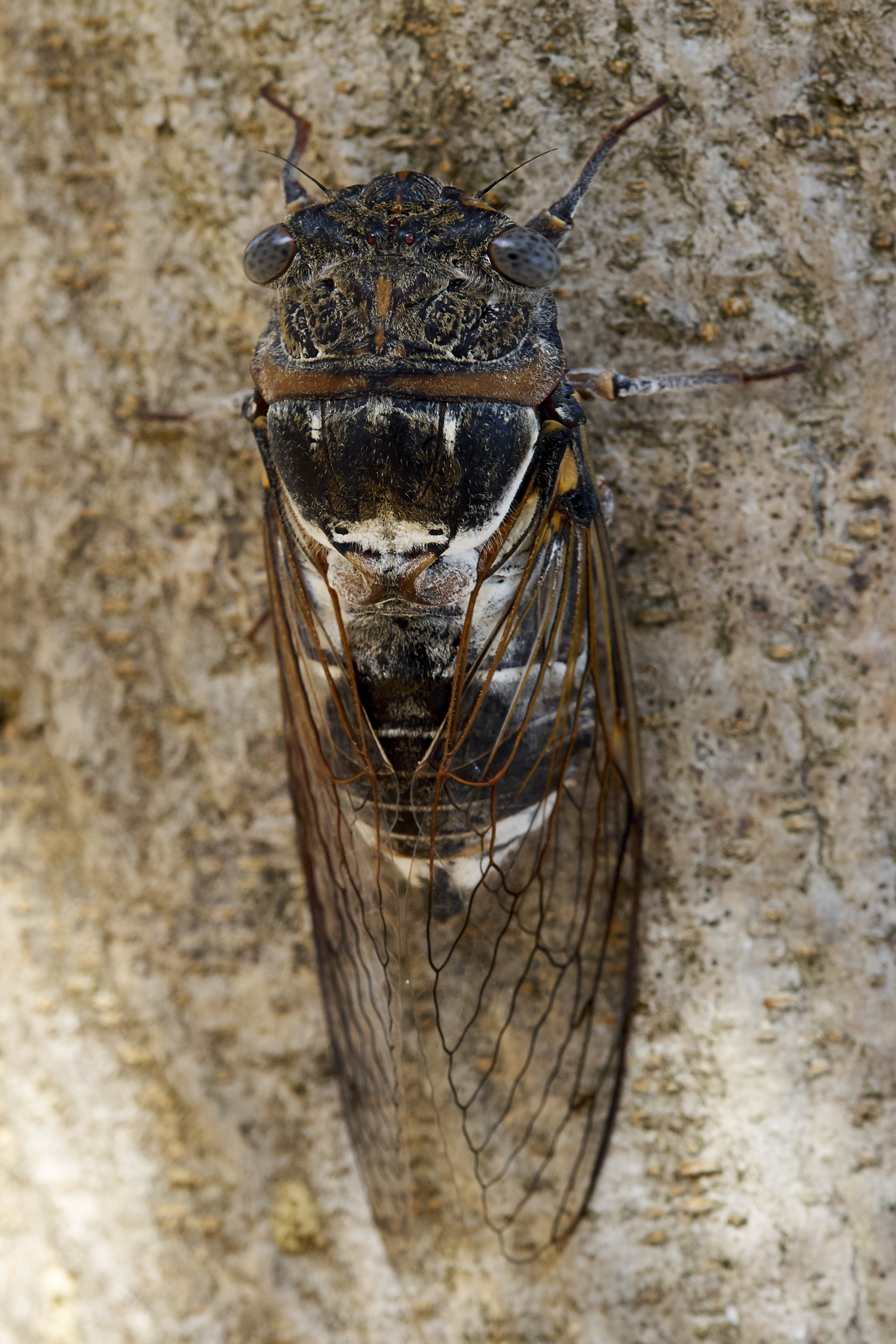

Scientific classification
- Kingdom: Animalia
- Phylum: Arthropoda
- Clade: Pancrustacea
- Class: Insecta
- Order: Hemiptera
- Suborder: Auchenorrhyncha
- Family: Cicadidae
- Genus: Lyristes
- Species: L. plebejus

Binomial name
- Lyristes plebejus (Scopoli, 1763)

= Lyristes plebejus =

Species of insect

Lyristes plebejus is a species of true cicada. It is widely distributed in the shrublands and woodlands of Southern Europe, commonly found on olive trees, pine trees, oaks, and fruit trees.
