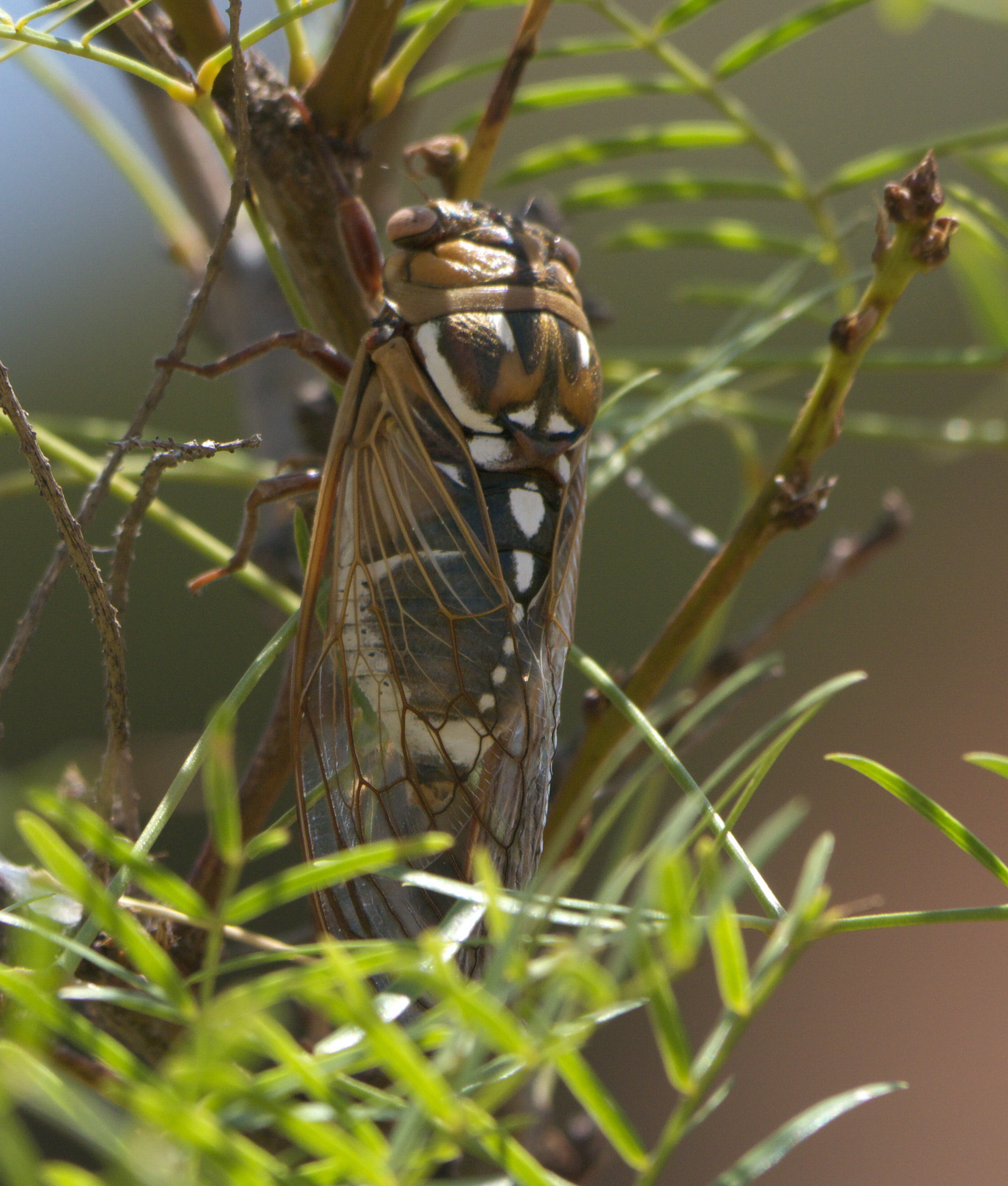

Scientific classification
- Kingdom: Animalia
- Phylum: Arthropoda
- Clade: Pancrustacea
- Class: Insecta
- Order: Hemiptera
- Suborder: Auchenorrhyncha
- Family: Cicadidae
- Genus: Megatibicen
- Species: M. dorsatus

Binomial name
- Megatibicen dorsatus (Say, 1825)

= Megatibicen dorsatus =

Species of true bug

Megatibicen dorsatus, known generally as the bush cicada or giant grassland cicada, is a species of cicada in the family Cicadidae.

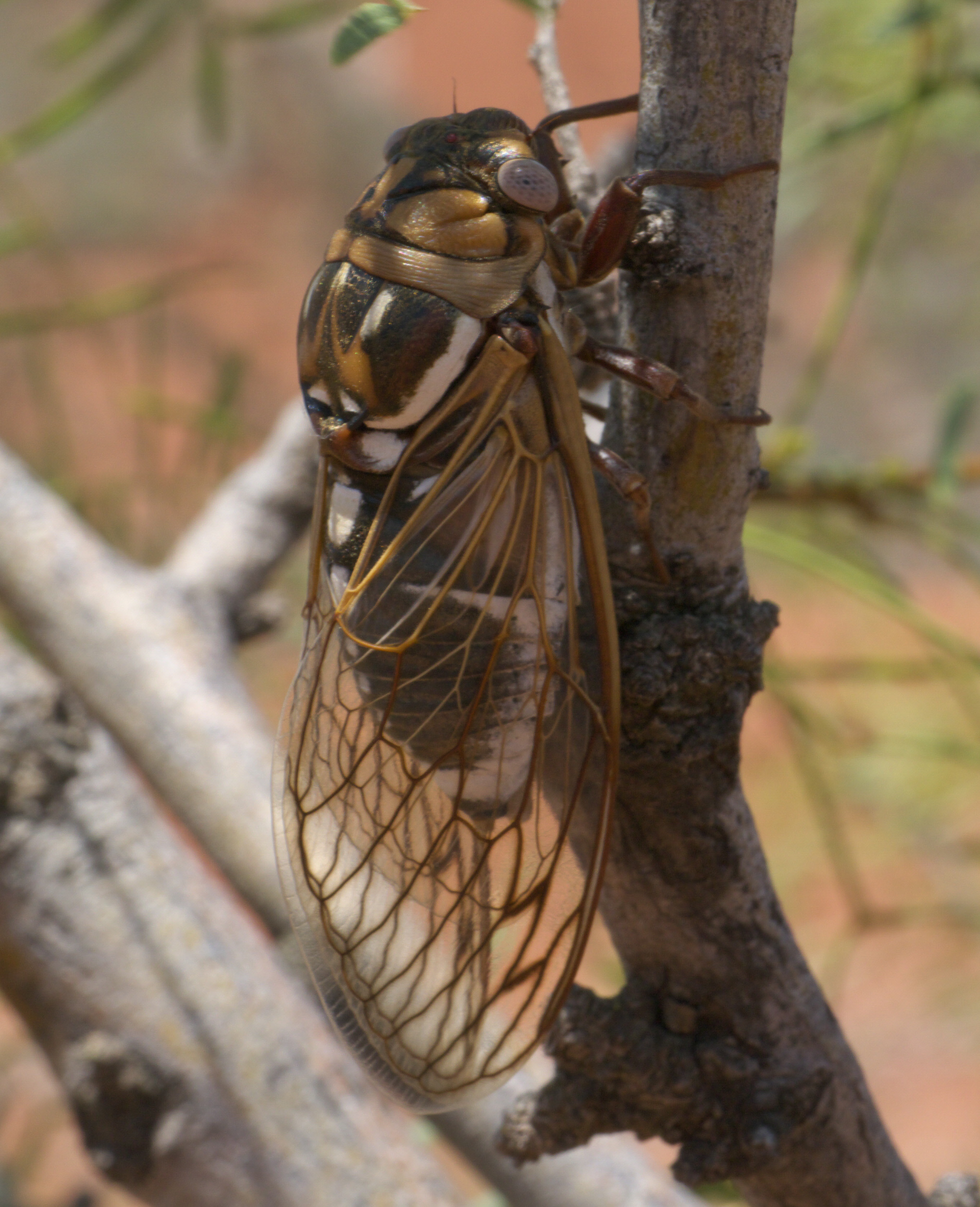
Bush cicada, Megatibicen dorsatus

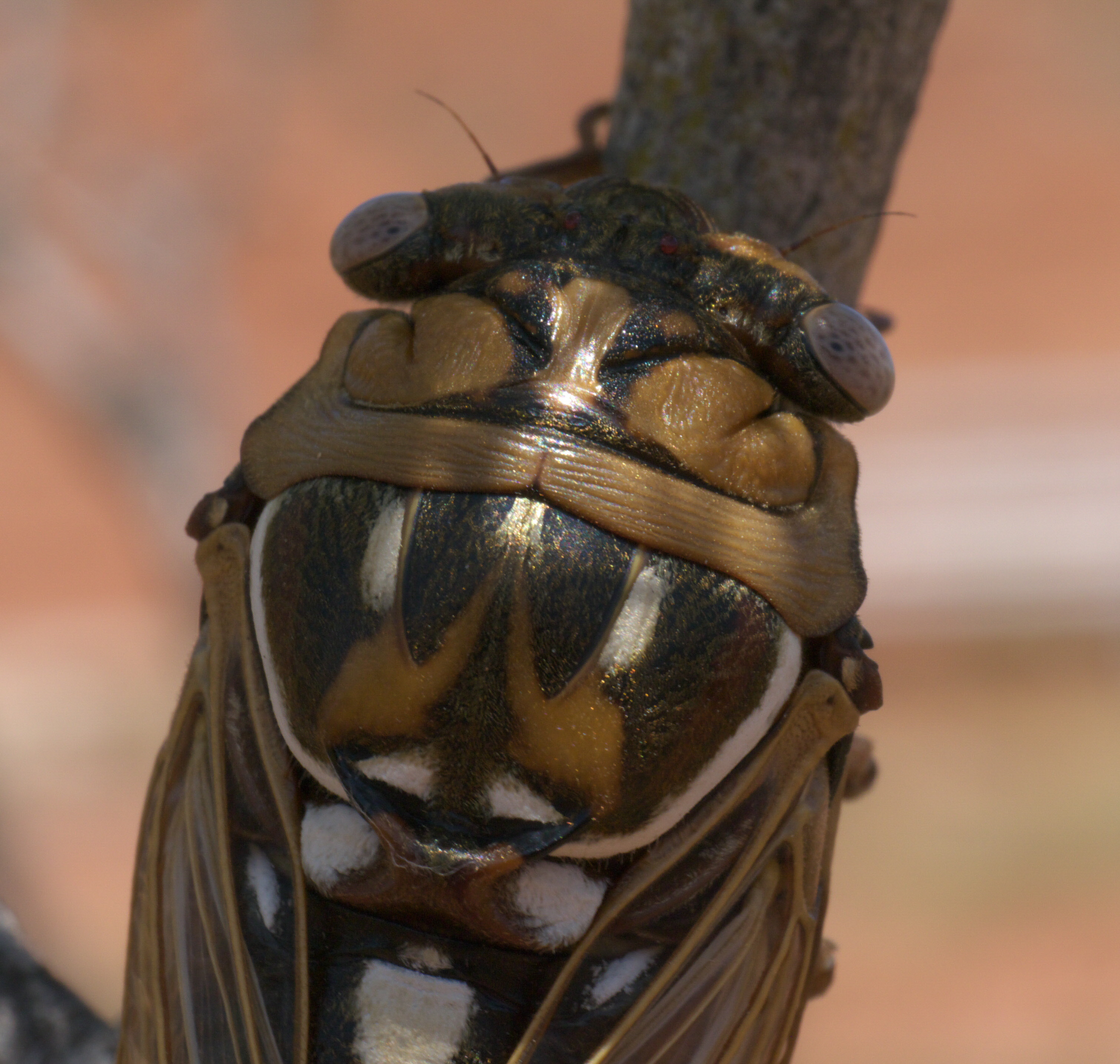
Bush cicada, Megatibicen dorsatus

== Notes ==
M. dorsatus is endemic to the tallgrass prairies of the central United States. Adult males are host to the acoustically hunting sarcophagid parasitoid, Emblemasoma erro.
