= Auritibicen =

Scientific classification
- Kingdom: Animalia
- Phylum: Arthropoda
- Class: Insecta
- Order: Hemiptera
- Suborder: Auchenorrhyncha
- Family: Cicadidae
- Subfamily: Cicadinae
- Tribe: Tacuini
- Subtribe: Tacuina
- Genus: Auritibicen; Lee, 2015

Synonyms
- Subsolanus Moulds, 2015

Genus of true bugs

Auritibicen is a genus of cicadas in the tribe Tacuini; species are found in (mostly temperate) East Asia, including Japan, Korea, China and Russia. The genus was first described by Young June Lee in 2015.

== Species ==
The following species are members of Auritibicen:

- Auritibicen aethus Wang, Hayashi & Wei, 2018
- Auritibicen atrofasciatus (Kirkaldy, 1909)
- Auritibicen bihamatus (de Motschulsky, 1861)
- Auritibicen chujoi (Esaki, 1935)
- Auritibicen curvatus Wang, Hayashi & Wei, 2018
- Auritibicen daoxianensis Wang, Hayashi & Wei, 2018
- Auritibicen esakii (Kato, 1958)
- Auritibicen flammatus (Distant, 1892)
- Auritibicen flavomarginatus (Hayashi, 1977)
- Auritibicen gracilis Wang, Hayashi & Wei, 2018
- Auritibicen intermedius (Mori, 1931)
- Auritibicen jai (Ouchi, 1938)
- Auritibicen japonicus (Kato, 1925)
- Auritibicen kyushyuensis (Kato, 1926)
- Auritibicen leechi (Distant, 1890)
- Auritibicen lijiangensis Wang, Hayashi & Wei, 2018
- Auritibicen pallidus Wang, Hayashi & Wei, 2018
- Auritibicen parvus Wang, Hayashi & Wei, 2018
- Auritibicen pekinensis (Haupt, 1924)
- Auritibicen purus Wang, Hayashi & Wei, 2018
- Auritibicen rotundus Wang, Hayashi & Wei, 2018
- Auritibicen septatus Wang, Hayashi & Wei, 2018
- Auritibicen shikokuanus (Kato, 1959)
- Auritibicen slocumi (K.F. Chen, 1943)
- Auritibicen tazawai (Kato, 1939)
- Auritibicen tsaopaonensis (K.F. Chen, 1943)
