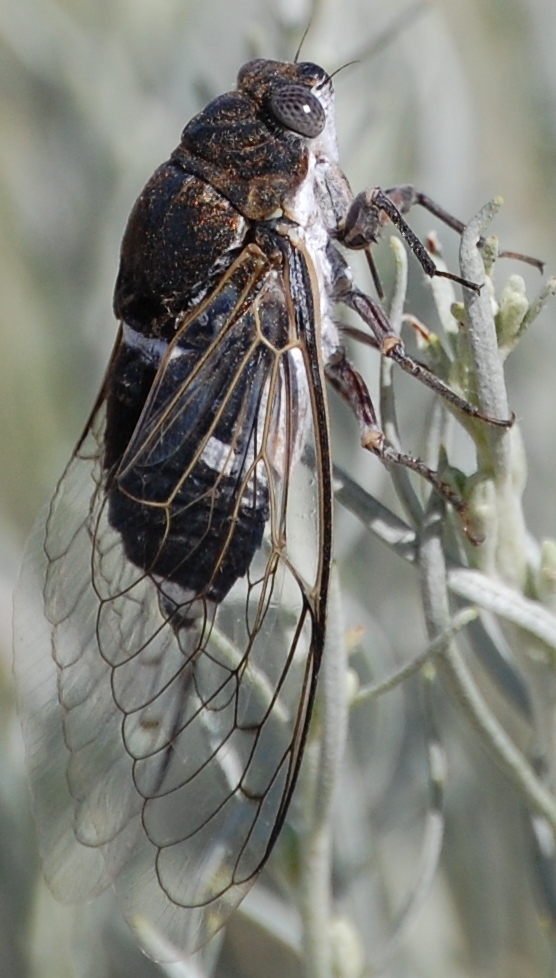
- Cacama

Scientific classification
- Kingdom: Animalia
- Phylum: Arthropoda
- Clade: Pancrustacea
- Class: Insecta
- Order: Hemiptera
- Suborder: Auchenorrhyncha
- Family: Cicadidae
- Tribe: Tacuini
- Subtribe: Tacuina; Distant, 1904

Synonyms
- Cicdaria [sic] Handlirsch, 1925; Cryptotympanaria Handlirsch, 1925; Cryptotympanini Handlirsch, 1925; Lyristarini Gómez-Menor Ortega, 1957; Lyristinae Gómez-Menor, 1957; Lyristini Gómez-Menor, 1957; Rihanaria Moulton, 1923; Tacuarini [sic] Distant, 1904; Tacuini Distant, 1904; Tibicenaria Distant, 1889; Tibiceninae Distant, 1889

= Tacuina =

Subtribe of true bugs

The Tacuina (previously known as the Cryptotympanini) is a subtribe of cicadas in the subfamily Cicadinae. They are found in the Nearctic, Palearctic, Indomalaya, Oceania, and Afrotropics.

== Genera ==
The World Auchenorrhyncha Database includes the following: (Note: A number of living genera have been moved to other tribes; the fossil genus †Camuracicada Moulds, 2018 is now placed incertae sedis in the Cicadidae.)

1. Auritibicen Lee, 2015
2. Cacama Distant, 1904 (cactus dodgers)
3. Chremistica Stål, 1870
4. Cornuplura Davis, 1944
5. Cryptotympana Stål, 1861
6. Hadoa Moulds, 2015 (western annual cicadas)
7. Lyristes Horváth, 1926 (synonym Tibicen) (Note: "Lyristes" was a junior synonym of Tibicen Latreille, 1825 and this case is now confirmed.)
8. Megatibicen Sanborn & Heath, 2016
9. Neotibicen Hill & Moulds, 2015 (annual or dogday cicadas)
10. Raiateana Boulard, 1979
11. Salvazana Distant, 1913 - monotypic S. mirabilis
12. Tacua Amyot & Audinet-Serville, 1843

== Note ==
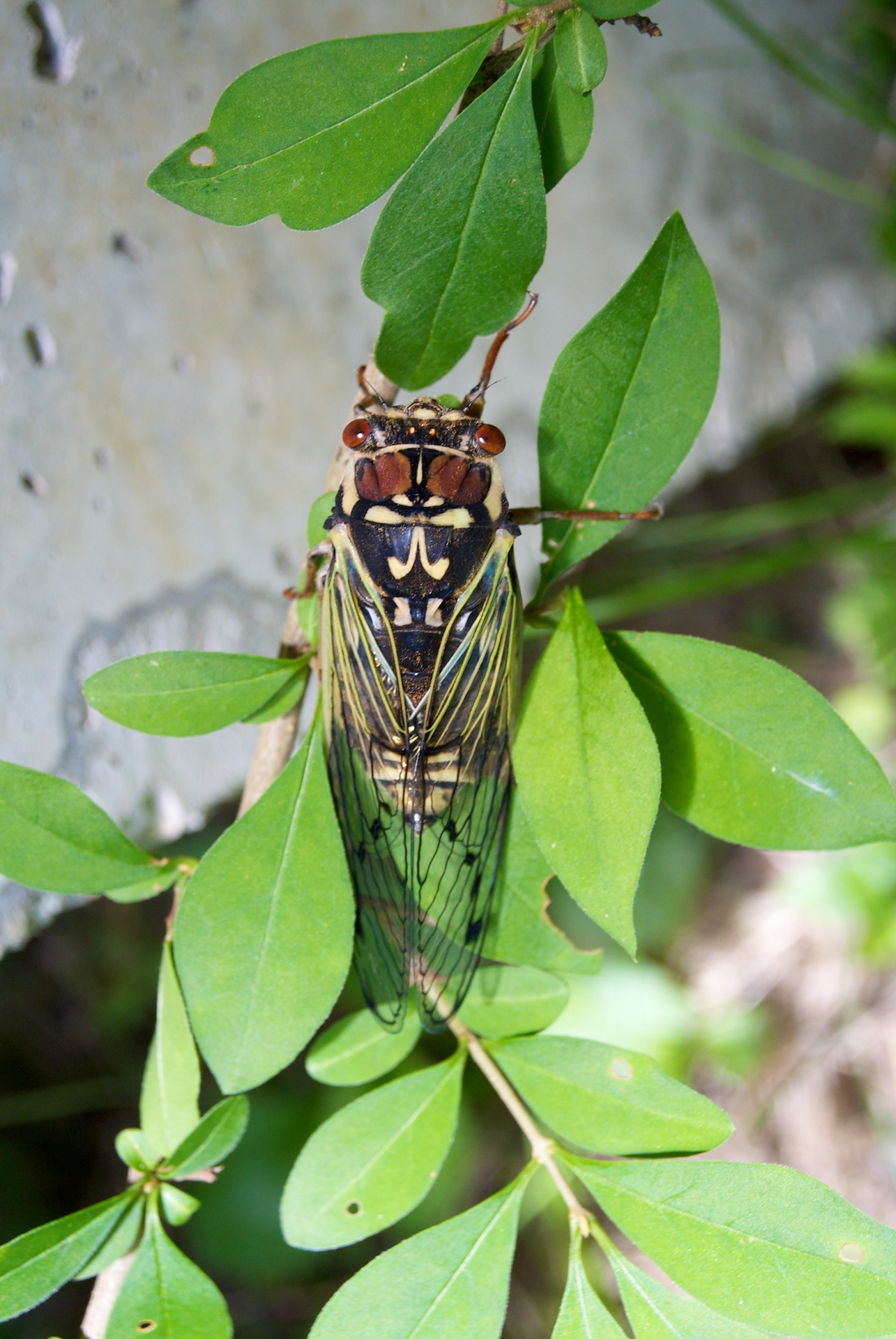
Auritibicen bihamatus on Euonymus spp.
