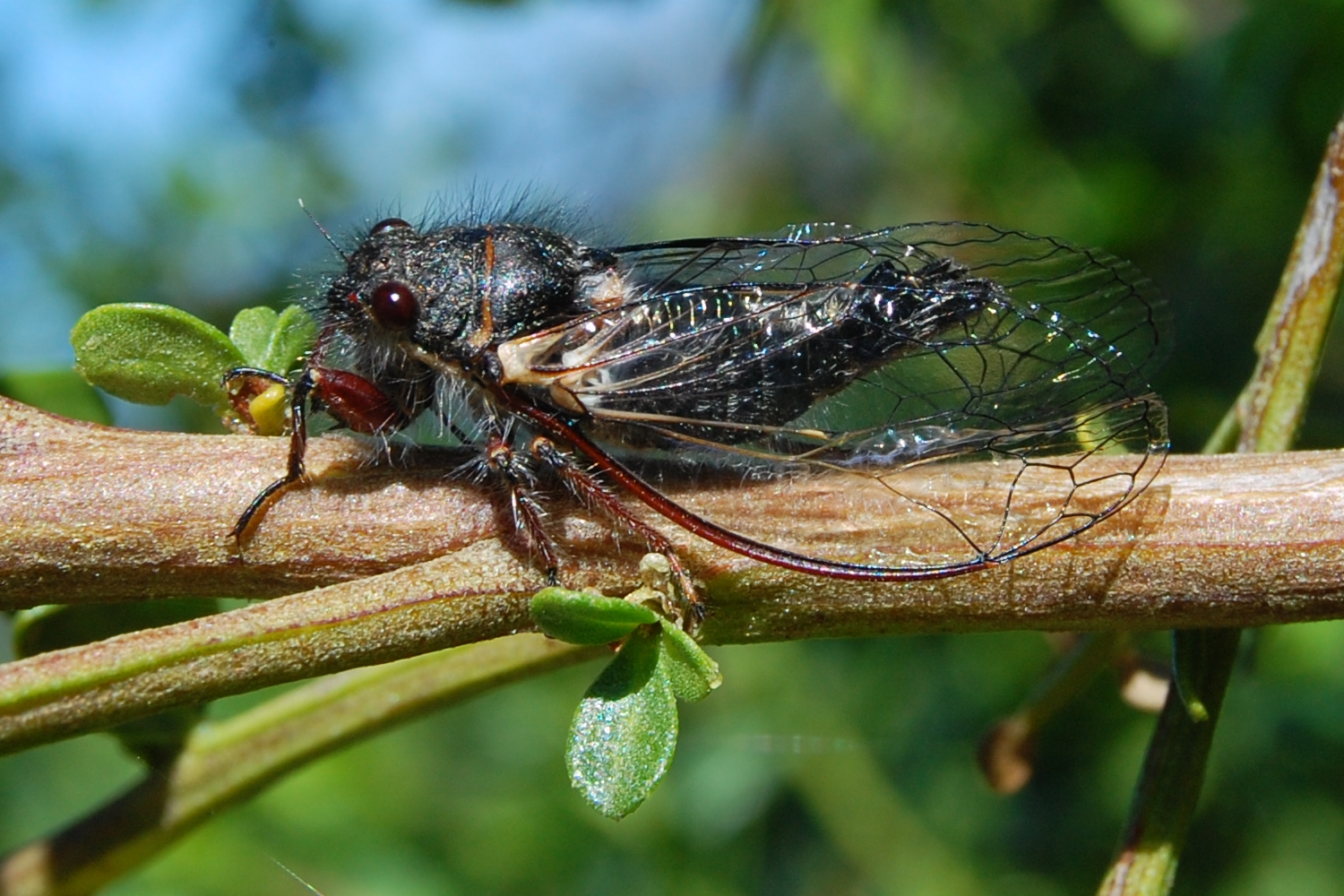
- Platypedia minor

Scientific classification
- Kingdom: Animalia
- Phylum: Arthropoda
- Class: Insecta
- Order: Hemiptera
- Suborder: Auchenorrhyncha
- Family: Cicadidae
- Subfamily: Tibicininae; Distant 1905

= Tibicininae =

Subfamily of true bugs

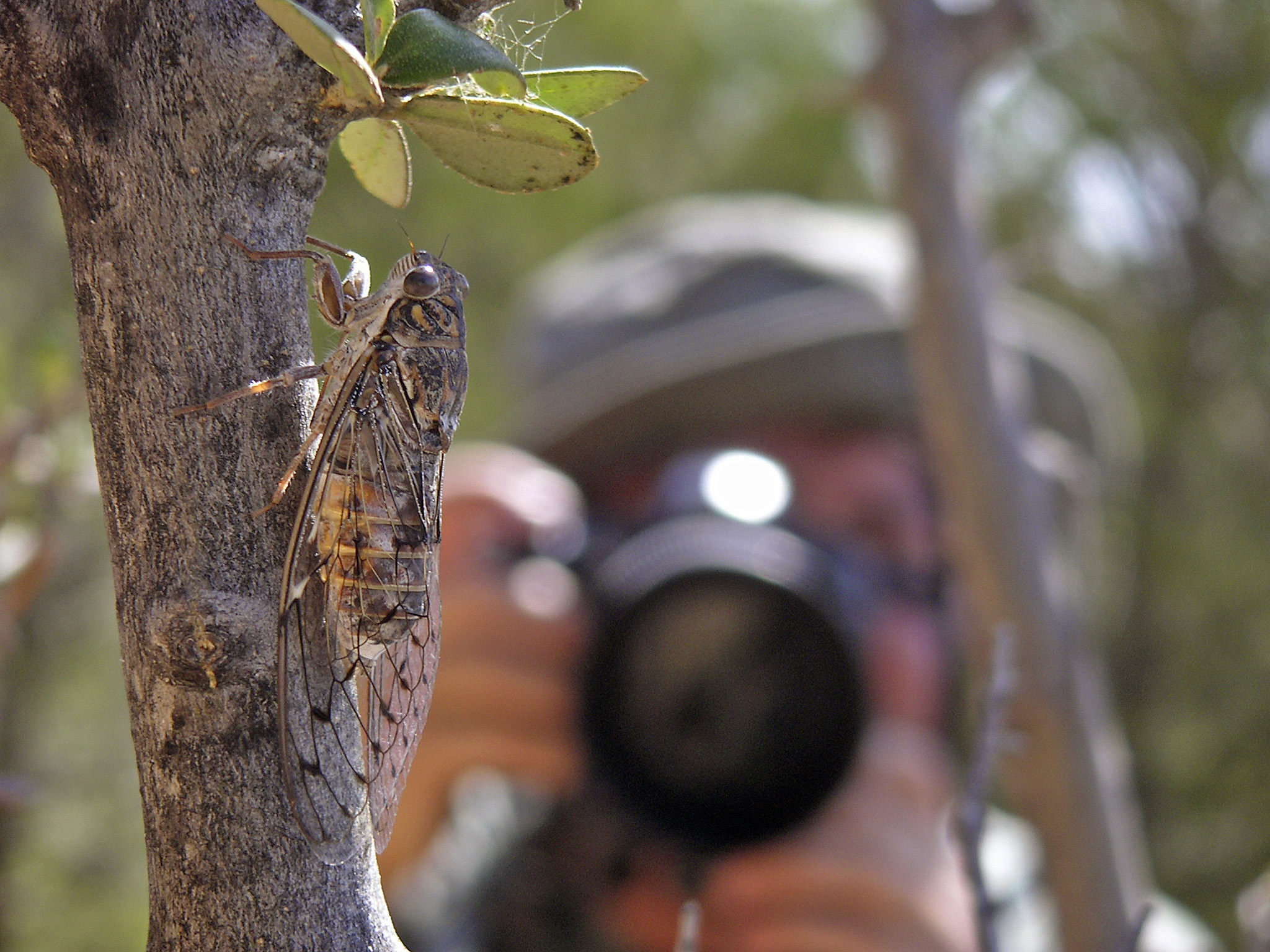
Tettigades chilensis

Tibicininae is a subfamily of cicadas in the family Cicadidae. There are at least 140 described species in Tibicininae. They are found in the Neotropics, the Nearctic, and the Palearctic.

Tibicininae underwent a major revision in 2005, and it was proposed to rename the subfamily Tettigadinae in order to avoid confusion due to the restructuring of the subfamily. This proposal was not universally accepted, and no official appeal was made for the name change. Even so, Tettigadinae is sometimes used as a name for this subfamily.

== Tribes ==
World Auchenorrhyncha Database includes:

1. Chilecicadini Sanborn, 2014
2. Citroriginini Sanborn, 2021 (monogeneric)
  1. Citroriginis Sanborn, 2021
3. Hemidictyini Distant, 1905 (monogeneric)
  1. Hemidictya Burmeister, 1835
4. Platypediini Kato, 1932
5. Sapantangini Sanborn, Marshall, Moulds, Puissant & Simon, 2020 (monogeneric)
  1. Sapantanga Distant, 1905
6. Selymbriini Moulds & Marshall, 2018
7. Tettigadini Distant, 1905
8. Tibicinini Distant, 1905

== Genera ==
These genera belong to the subfamily Tibicininae:

- Acuticephala Torres, 1958^{i c g}
- Alarcta Torres, 1958^{i c g}
- Babras Jacobi, 1907^{i c g}
- Calliopsida Torres, 1958^{i c g}
- Chilecicada Sanborn, 2014^{c g}
- Chonosia Distant, 1905^{i c g}
- Clidophleps Van Duzee, 1915^{i c g b}
- Coata Distant, 1906^{i c g}
- Mendozana Distant, 1906^{i c g}
- Neoplatypedia Davis, 1920^{i c g b}
- Okanagana Distant, 1905^{i c g b}
- Okanagodes Davis, 1919^{i c g b}
- Paharia Distant, 1905^{c g}
- Platypedia Uhler, 1888^{i c g b}
- Psephenotettix Torres, 1958^{i c g}
- Selymbria Stål, 1861^{i c g}
- Subpsaltria Chen, 1943^{c g}
- Subtibicina Lee, 2012^{c g}
- Tettigades Amyot & Audinet-Serville, 1843^{i c g}
- Tettigotoma Torres, 1942^{i c g}
- Tibicina Kolenati, 1857^{i c g}
- Tibicinoides Distant, 1914^{i c g b}
- Torrescada Sanborn & Heath, 2017^{c g}

Data sources: i = ITIS, c = Catalogue of Life, g = GBIF, b = Bugguide.net
