= Okanagana striatipes =

Scientific classification
- Domain: Eukaryota
- Kingdom: Animalia
- Phylum: Arthropoda
- Class: Insecta
- Order: Hemiptera
- Suborder: Auchenorrhyncha
- Family: Cicadidae
- Tribe: Tibicinini
- Genus: Okanagana
- Species: O. striatipes

Binomial name
- Okanagana striatipes (Haldeman, 1852)

Species of true bug

Okanagana striatipes is a species of cicada in the family Cicadidae. It is found in North America.

== Subspecies ==
These two subspecies belong to the species Okanagana striatipes:

- Okanagana striatipes beameri Davis, 1930
- Okanagana striatipes striatipes (Haldeman, 1852)
