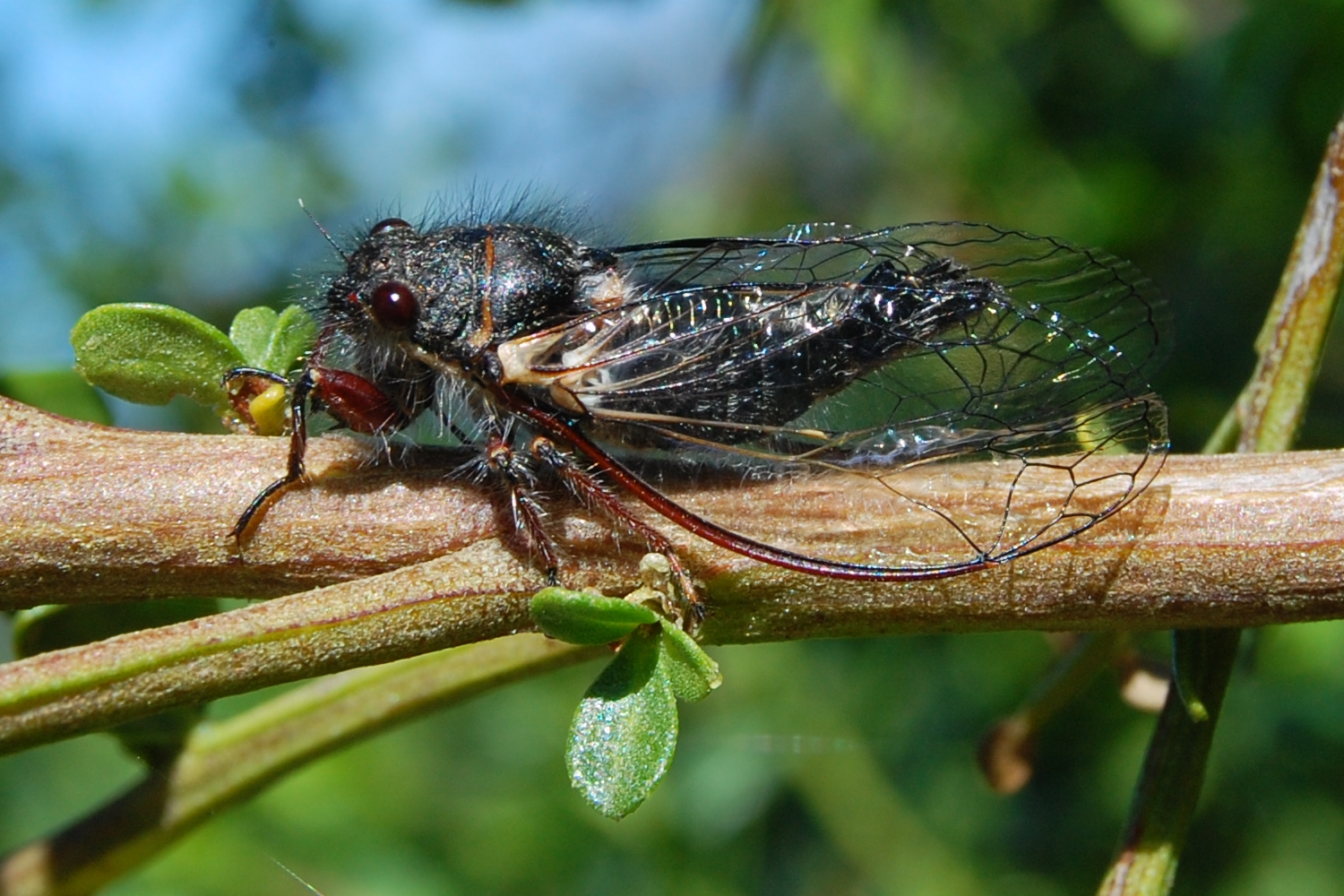
- Platypedia minor

Scientific classification
- Domain: Eukaryota
- Kingdom: Animalia
- Phylum: Arthropoda
- Class: Insecta
- Order: Hemiptera
- Suborder: Auchenorrhyncha
- Superfamily: Cicadoidea
- Family: Cicadidae
- Subfamily: Tibicininae
- Tribe: Platypediini; Kato, 1932

= Platypediini =

Tribe of true bugs

Platypediini is a tribe of cicadas in the family Cicadidae. There are at least 2 genera and 20 described species in Platypediini, found in the Nearctic.

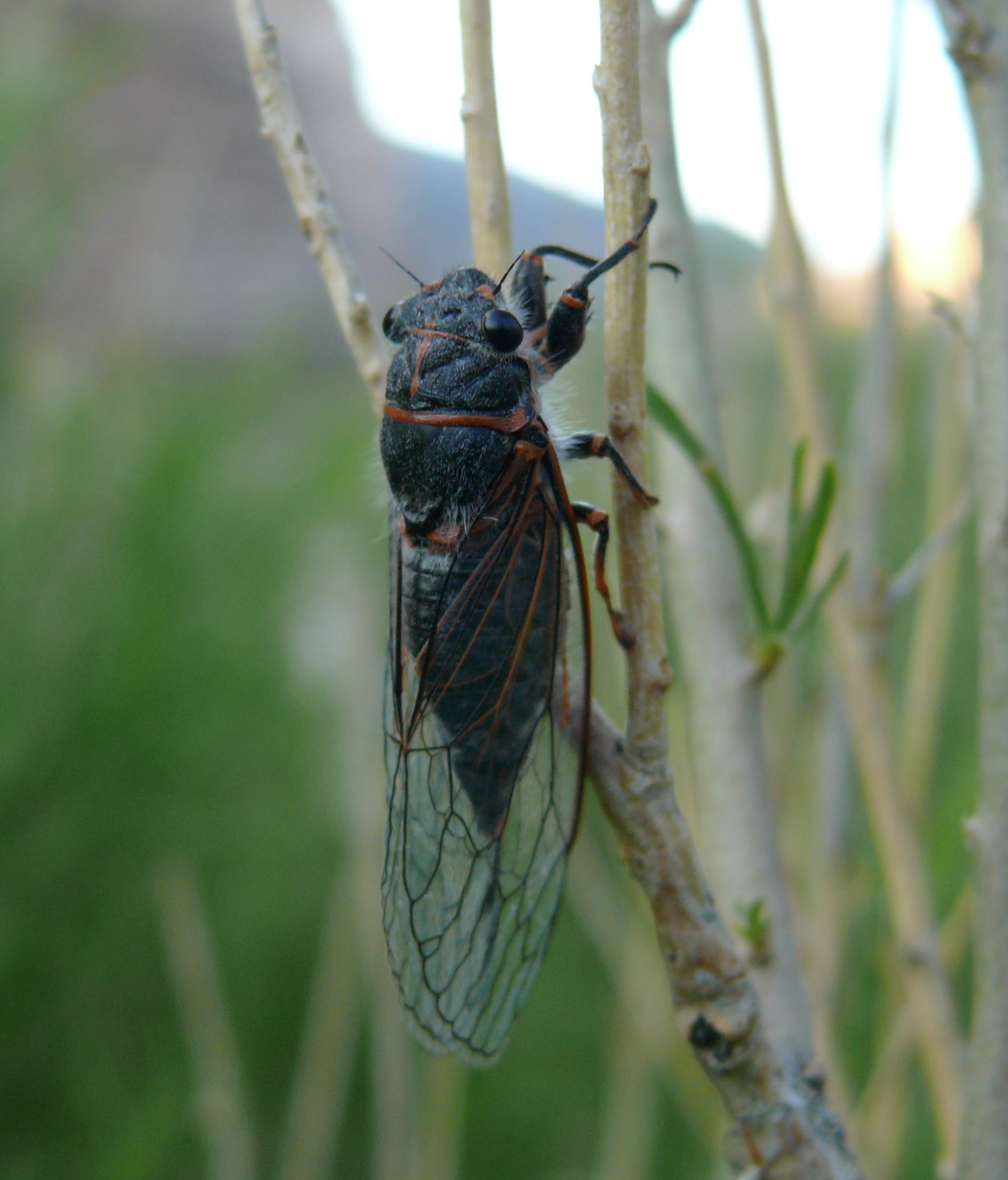
Platypedia putnami

== Genera ==
These two genera belong to the tribe Platypediini:

- Neoplatypedia Davis, 1920
- Platypedia Uhler, 1888
