= Okanagana rubrovenosa =

Scientific classification
- Domain: Eukaryota
- Kingdom: Animalia
- Phylum: Arthropoda
- Class: Insecta
- Order: Hemiptera
- Suborder: Auchenorrhyncha
- Family: Cicadidae
- Tribe: Tibicinini
- Genus: Okanagana
- Species: O. rubrovenosa

Binomial name
- Okanagana rubrovenosa Davis, 1915

Species of true bug

Okanagana rubrovenosa is a species of cicada in the family Cicadidae. It is found in North America, most often in Arizona, California, Oregon, and Utah. It is orange in black in color, but can lose its color as it ages.
