= Okanagana canadensis =

Scientific classification
- Domain: Eukaryota
- Kingdom: Animalia
- Phylum: Arthropoda
- Class: Insecta
- Order: Hemiptera
- Suborder: Auchenorrhyncha
- Family: Cicadidae
- Genus: Okanagana
- Species: O. canadensis

Binomial name
- Okanagana canadensis (Provancher, 1889)

Species of true bug

Okanagana canadensis, the Canadian cicada, is a species of cicada in the family Cicadidae. It is found in North America. Males call to females while perched on trees.
