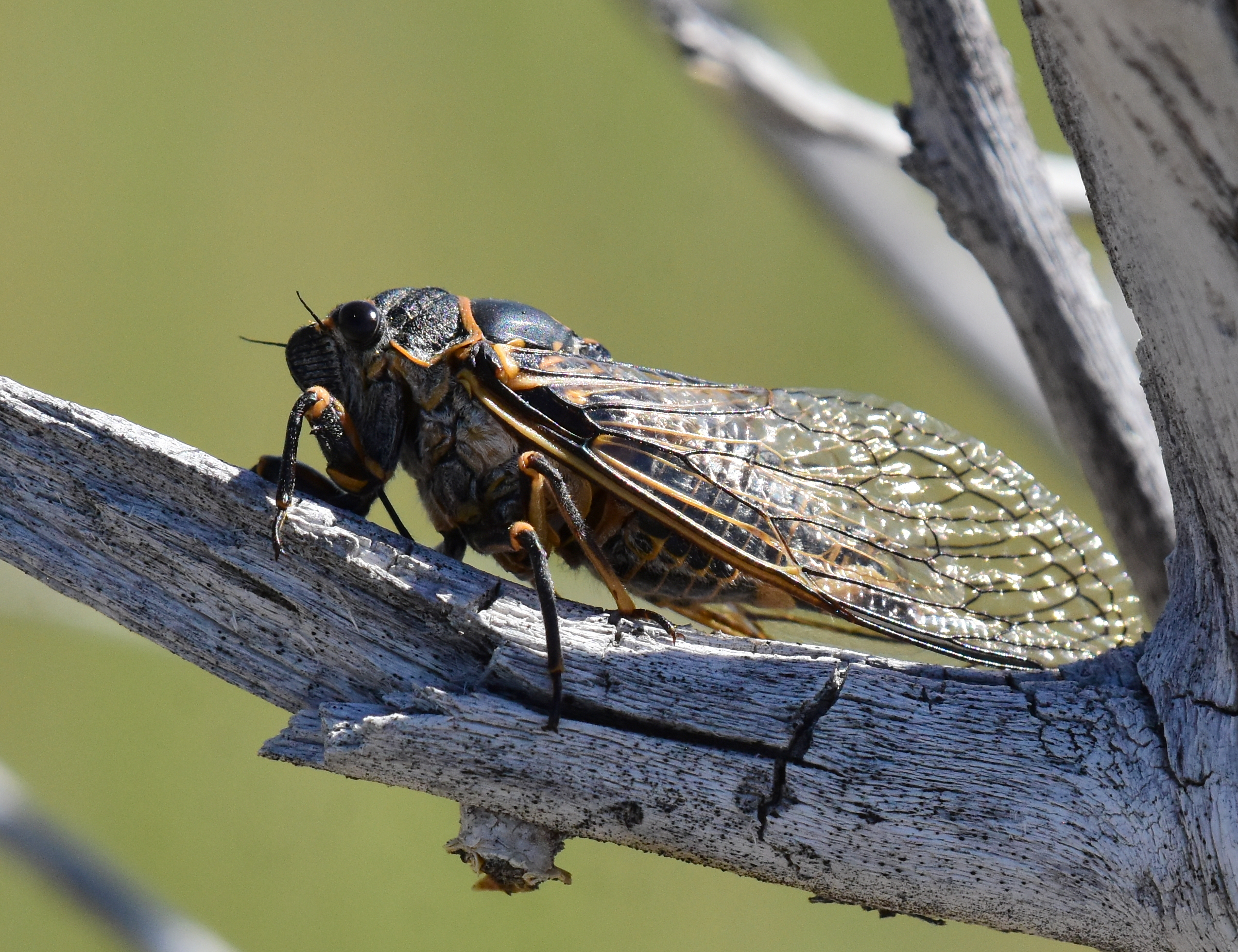

Scientific classification
- Kingdom: Animalia
- Phylum: Arthropoda
- Clade: Pancrustacea
- Class: Insecta
- Order: Hemiptera
- Suborder: Auchenorrhyncha
- Family: Cicadidae
- Tribe: Tibicinini
- Genus: Okanagana
- Species: O. bella

Binomial name
- Okanagana bella Davis, 1919

= Okanagana bella =

Species of true bug

Okanagana bella, the mountain cicada, is a species of cicada in the family Cicadidae. It is found in North America.
