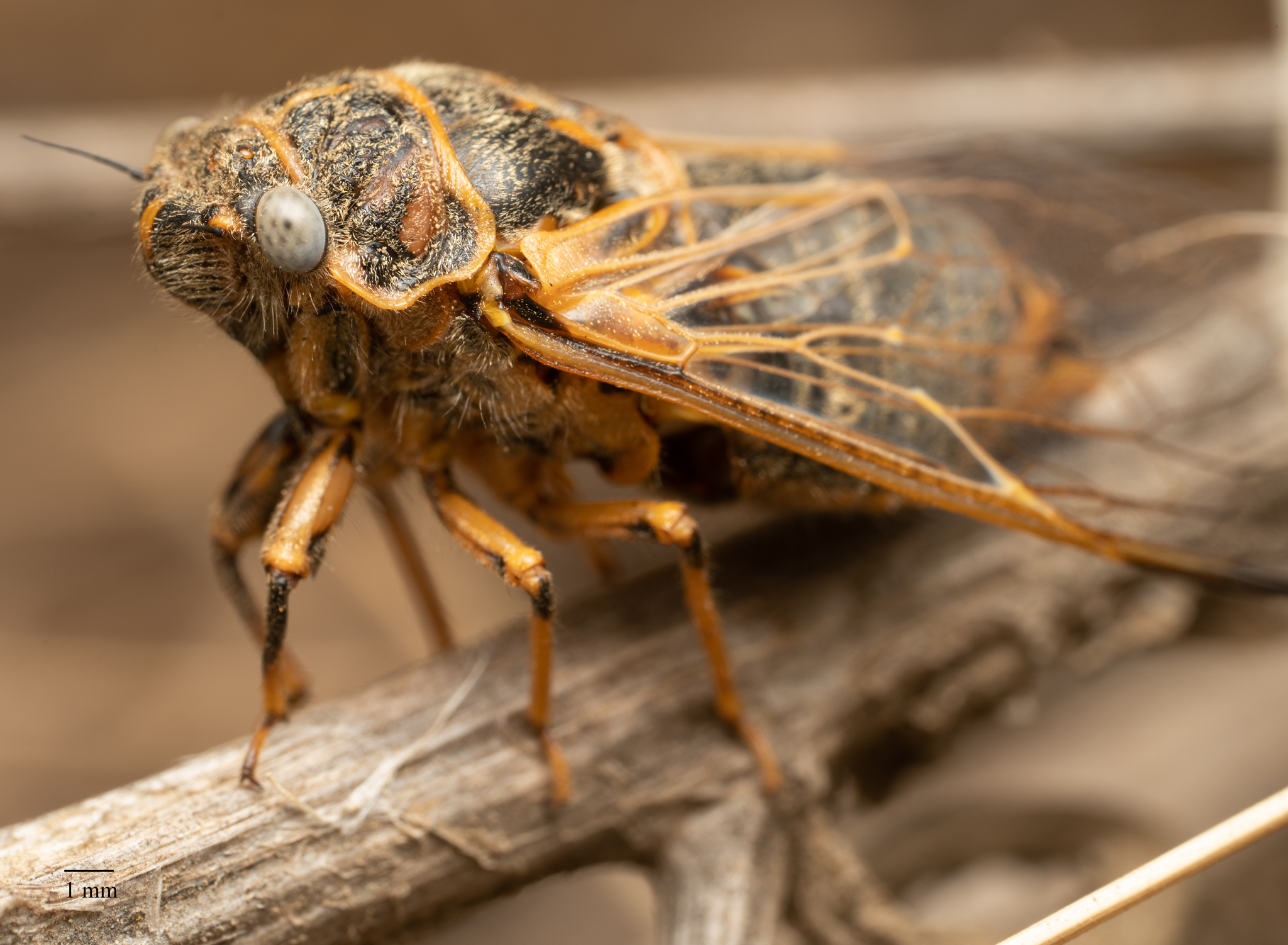

Scientific classification
- Kingdom: Animalia
- Phylum: Arthropoda
- Class: Insecta
- Order: Hemiptera
- Suborder: Auchenorrhyncha
- Family: Cicadidae
- Genus: Tibicinoides
- Species: T. vanduzeei

Binomial name
- Tibicinoides vanduzeei (Distant, 1914)

Synonyms
- Okanagana vanduzeei Distant, 1914

= Tibicinoides vanduzeei =

Species of true bug

Tibicinoides vanduzeei, also known as Van Duzee's cicada, is a species of cicada in the family Cicadidae. It is found in western North America from Baja California (Mexico) through the western United States to British Columbia (Canada). This bug was previously known as Okanagana vanduzeei but was transferred out of the genus Okanagana in 2023. The name is a reference to E. P. Van Duzee who collected the holotype.

Tibicinoides vanduzeei generally measure less than 20 mm (0.79 in). They are generalists but are primarily associated with grasslands.
