= Okanagana tristis =

Scientific classification
- Domain: Eukaryota
- Kingdom: Animalia
- Phylum: Arthropoda
- Class: Insecta
- Order: Hemiptera
- Suborder: Auchenorrhyncha
- Family: Cicadidae
- Tribe: Tibicinini
- Genus: Okanagana
- Species: O. tristis

Binomial name
- Okanagana tristis Van Duzee, 1915

Synonyms
- Okanagana davisi Simons, 1953

Species of true bug

Okanagana tristis is a species of cicada in the family Cicadidae. It is found in North America.

== Subspecies ==
These two subspecies belong to the species Okanagana tristis:

- Okanagana tristis rubrobasalis Davis, 1926
- Okanagana tristis tristis Van Duzee, 1915
