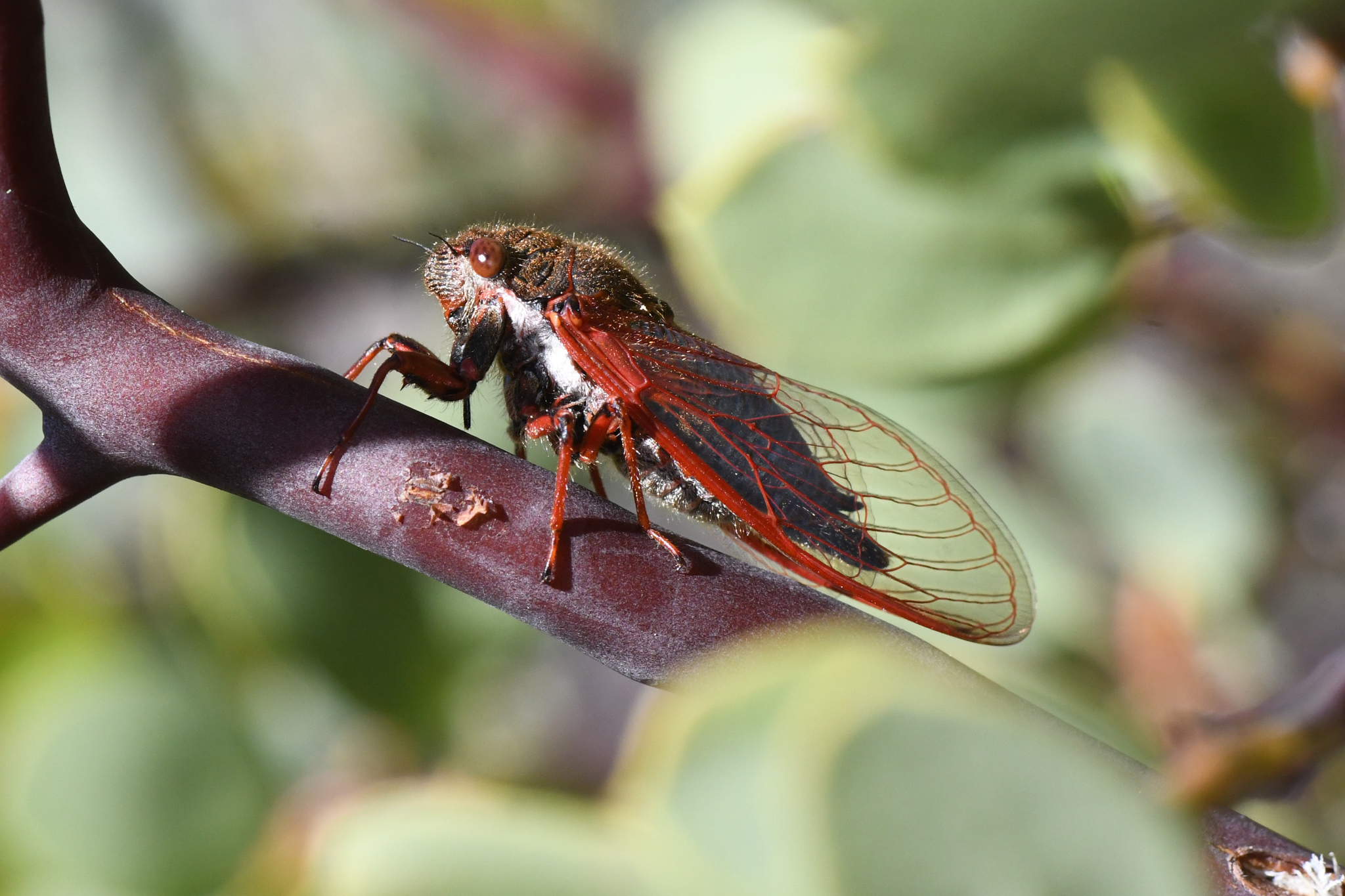
- Tibicinoides rubrovenosa

Scientific classification
- Domain: Eukaryota
- Kingdom: Animalia
- Phylum: Arthropoda
- Class: Insecta
- Order: Hemiptera
- Suborder: Auchenorrhyncha
- Family: Cicadidae
- Subfamily: Tibicininae
- Tribe: Tibicinini
- Genus: Tibicinoides; Distant, 1914

= Tibicinoides =

Genus of true bugs

Tibicinoides is a genus of cicadas in the family Cicadidae.

Species in the genus, all but three recently moved from Okanagana, include:

- Tibicinoides boweni
- Tibicinoides catalina
- Tibicinoides cupreosparsa
- Tibicinoides hesperia
- Tibicinoides mercedita
- Tibicinoides minuta
- Tibicinoides pallidula
- Tibicinoides pernix
- Tibicinoides rubrovenosa
- Tibicinoides simulata
- Tibicinoides striatipes
- Tibicinoides uncinata
- Tibicinoides utahensis
- Tibicinoides vanduzeei
