= Okanagana balli =

Scientific classification
- Domain: Eukaryota
- Kingdom: Animalia
- Phylum: Arthropoda
- Class: Insecta
- Order: Hemiptera
- Suborder: Auchenorrhyncha
- Family: Cicadidae
- Tribe: Tibicinini
- Genus: Okanagana
- Species: O. balli

Binomial name
- Okanagana balli Davis, 1919

Species of true bug

Okanagana balli is a species of cicada in the family Cicadidae. It is found in North America.
