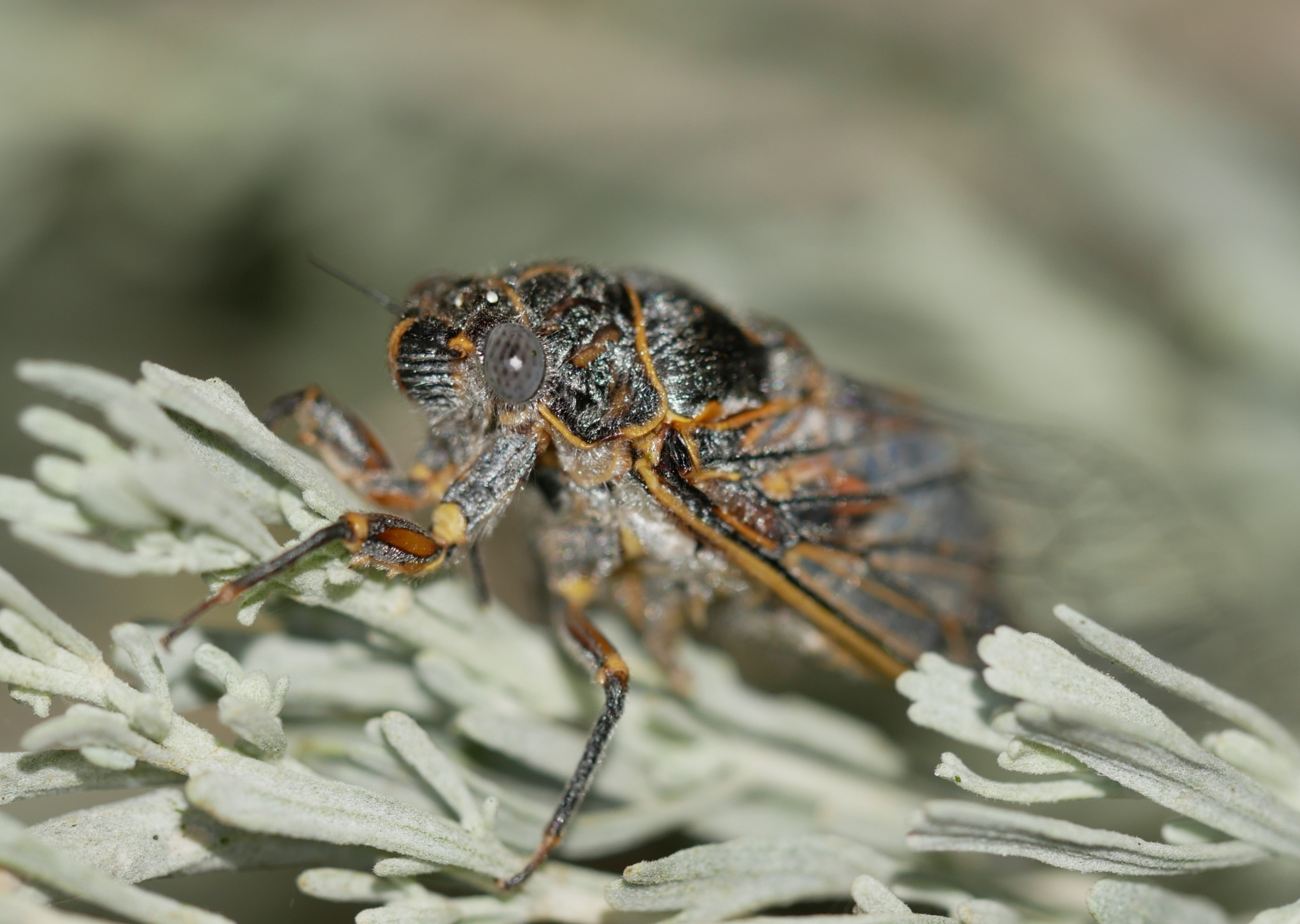

Scientific classification
- Kingdom: Animalia
- Phylum: Arthropoda
- Class: Insecta
- Order: Hemiptera
- Suborder: Auchenorrhyncha
- Family: Cicadidae
- Tribe: Tibicinini
- Genus: Tibicinoides
- Species: T. utahensis

Binomial name
- Tibicinoides utahensis (Davis, 1919)

Synonyms
- Okanagana utahensis Davis, 1919

= Tibicinoides utahensis =

Species of true bug

Tibicinoides utahensis is a species of cicada in the family Cicadidae. It is found in the Western United States and in British Columbia (Canada). It is associated with Artemisia tridentata.
