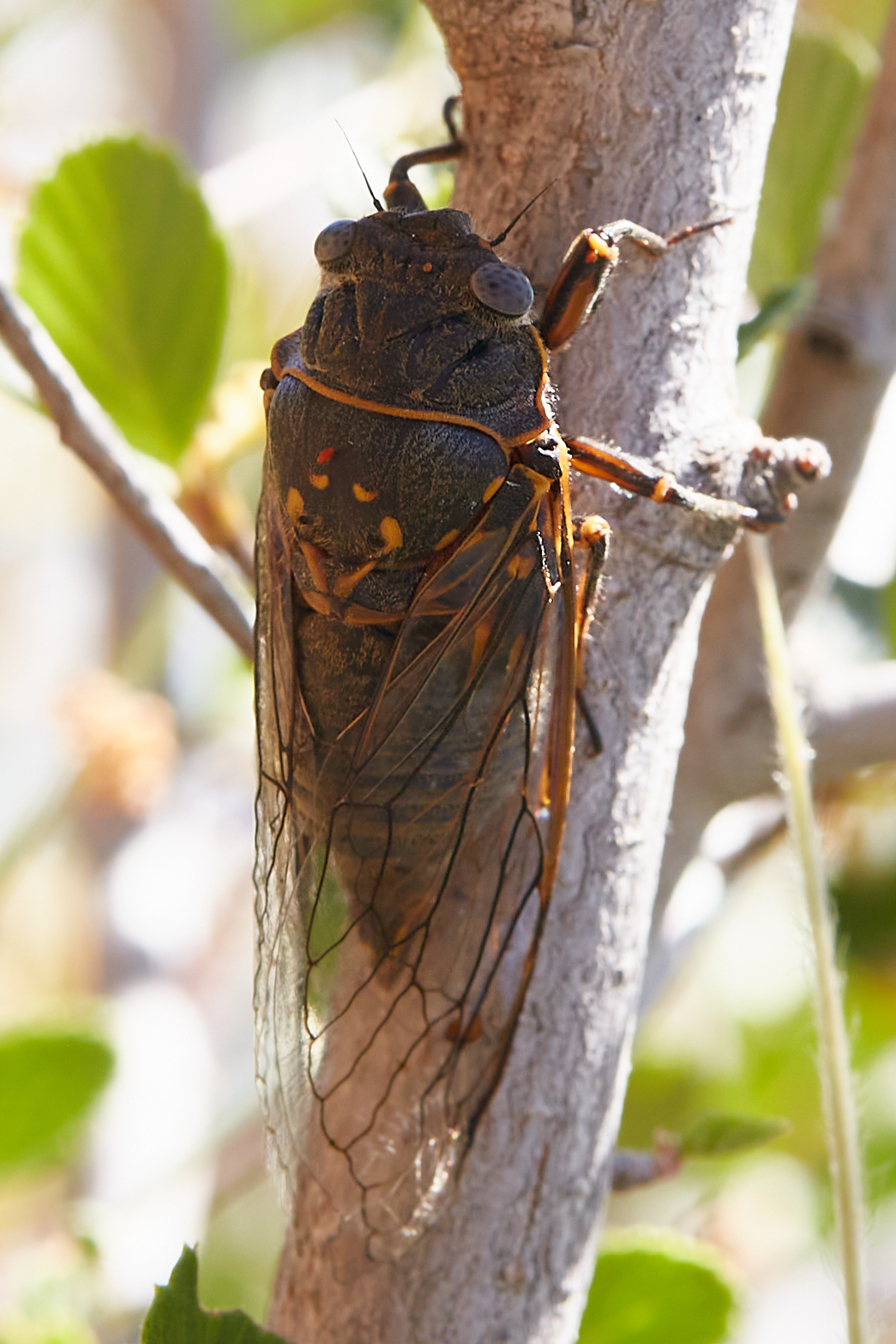

Scientific classification
- Kingdom: Animalia
- Phylum: Arthropoda
- Clade: Pancrustacea
- Class: Insecta
- Order: Hemiptera
- Suborder: Auchenorrhyncha
- Family: Cicadidae
- Tribe: Tibicinini
- Genus: Okanagana
- Species: O. mariposa

Binomial name
- Okanagana mariposa Davis, 1915

= Okanagana mariposa =

Species of true bug

Okanagana mariposa is a species of cicada in the family Cicadidae. It is found in North America.

== Subspecies ==
These two subspecies belong to the species Okanagana mariposa:

- Okanagana mariposa mariposa Davis, 1915
- Okanagana mariposa oregonensis Davis, 1939
