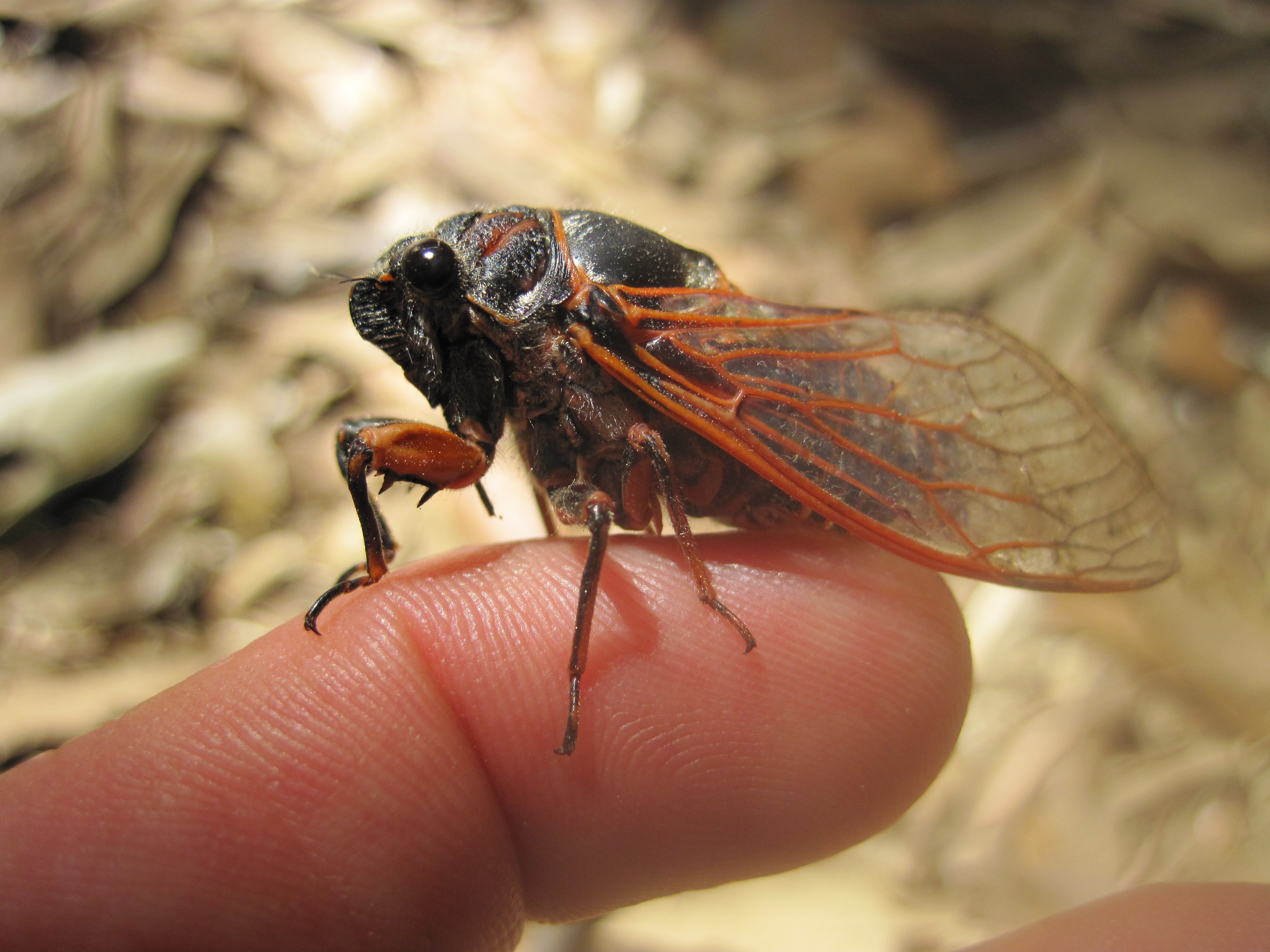
- Tibicina haematodes

Scientific classification
- Domain: Eukaryota
- Kingdom: Animalia
- Phylum: Arthropoda
- Class: Insecta
- Order: Hemiptera
- Suborder: Auchenorrhyncha
- Family: Cicadidae
- Genus: Tibicina
- Species: T. haematodes

Binomial name
- Tibicina haematodes (Scopoli, 1763)

= Tibicina haematodes =

Species of true bug

Tibicina haematodes is a species of cicadas belonging to the family Cicadidae, subfamily Tibicininae.

== Etymology ==
The species name haematodes is due to the fact that the veins of the forewing are brown-red.

== Distribution ==
This species is present in Central and Southern Europe, in the Near East and in North Africa.
