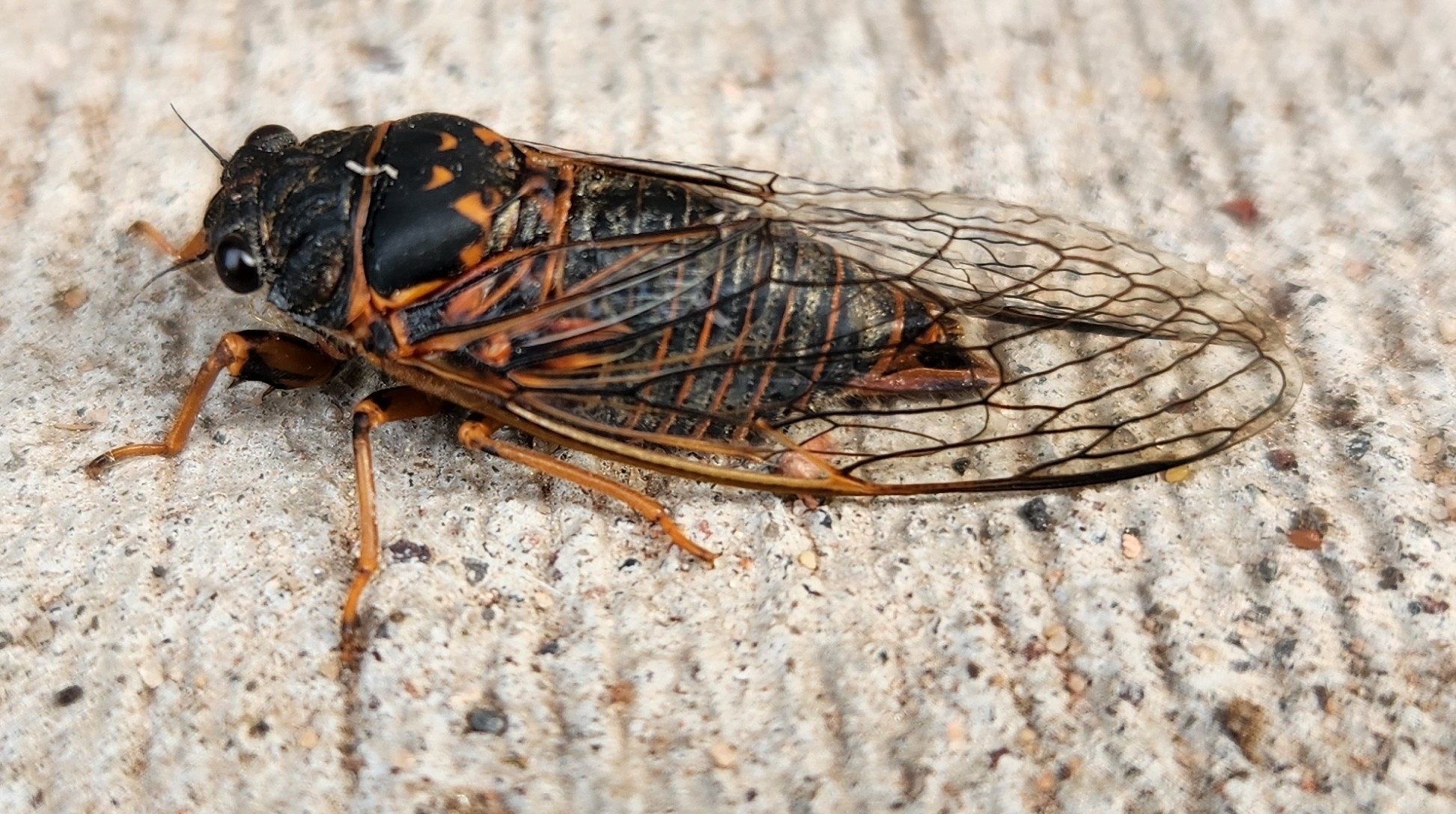

Scientific classification
- Kingdom: Animalia
- Phylum: Arthropoda
- Clade: Pancrustacea
- Class: Insecta
- Order: Hemiptera
- Suborder: Auchenorrhyncha
- Family: Cicadidae
- Genus: Okanagana
- Species: O. rimosa

Binomial name
- Okanagana rimosa (Say, 1830)

= Okanagana rimosa =

Species of true bug native to North America

Okanagana rimosa, or Say's cicada, is a species of cicada in the family Cicadidae. It is found in North America.

== Subspecies ==
These two subspecies belong to the species Okanagana rimosa:

- Okanagana rimosa ohioensis Davis, 1942
- Okanagana rimosa rimosa (Say, 1830)
