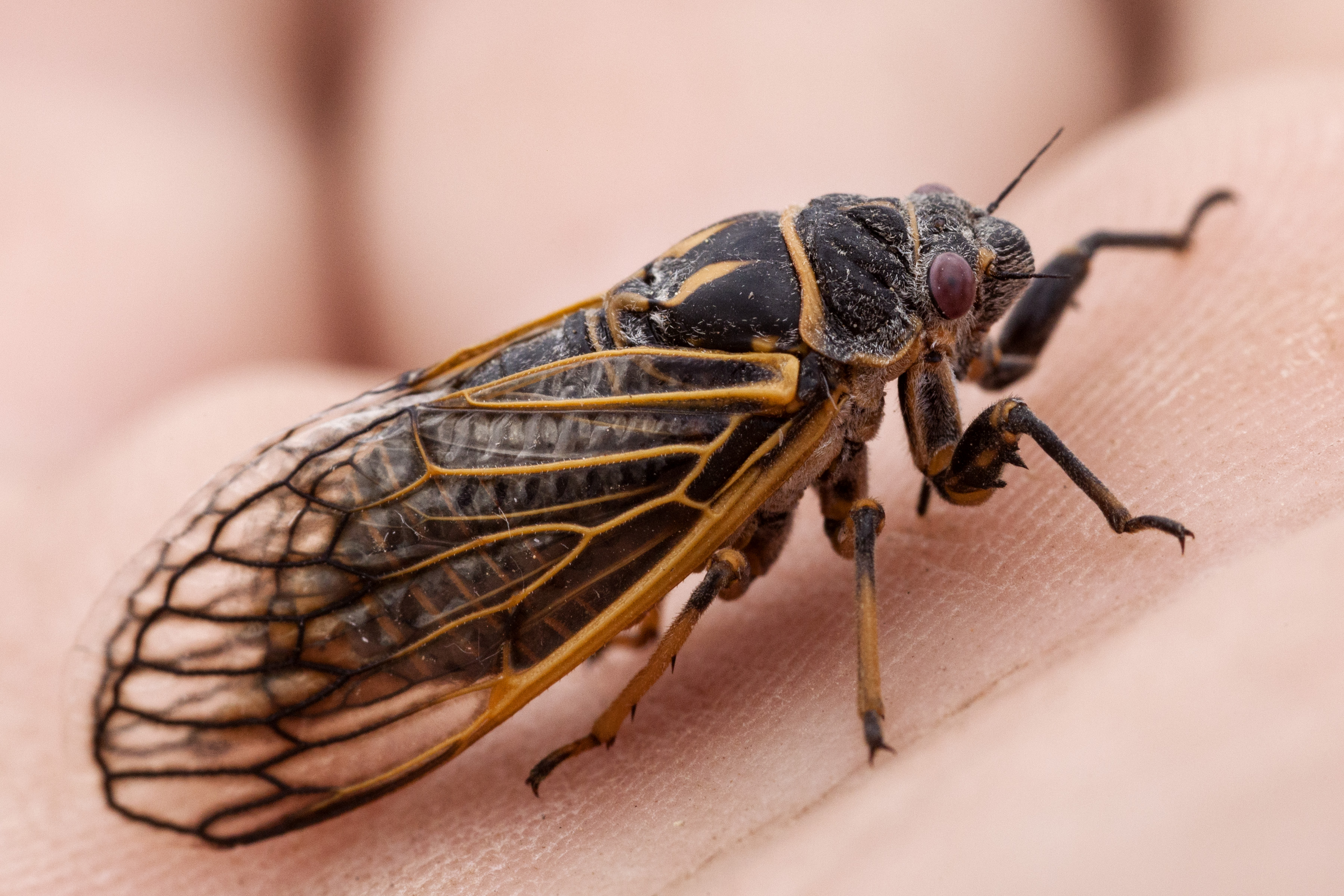
- Okanagana synodica nigra

Scientific classification
- Kingdom: Animalia
- Phylum: Arthropoda
- Clade: Pancrustacea
- Class: Insecta
- Order: Hemiptera
- Suborder: Auchenorrhyncha
- Family: Cicadidae
- Genus: Okanagana
- Species: O. synodica

Binomial name
- Okanagana synodica (Say, 1825)

= Okanagana synodica =

Species of true bug

Okanagana synodica, the walking cicada, is a species of cicada in the family Cicadidae. It is found in North America.

== Subspecies ==
These two subspecies belong to the species Okanagana synodica:

- Okanagana synodica nigra Davis, 1944
- Okanagana synodica synodica (Say, 1825)
