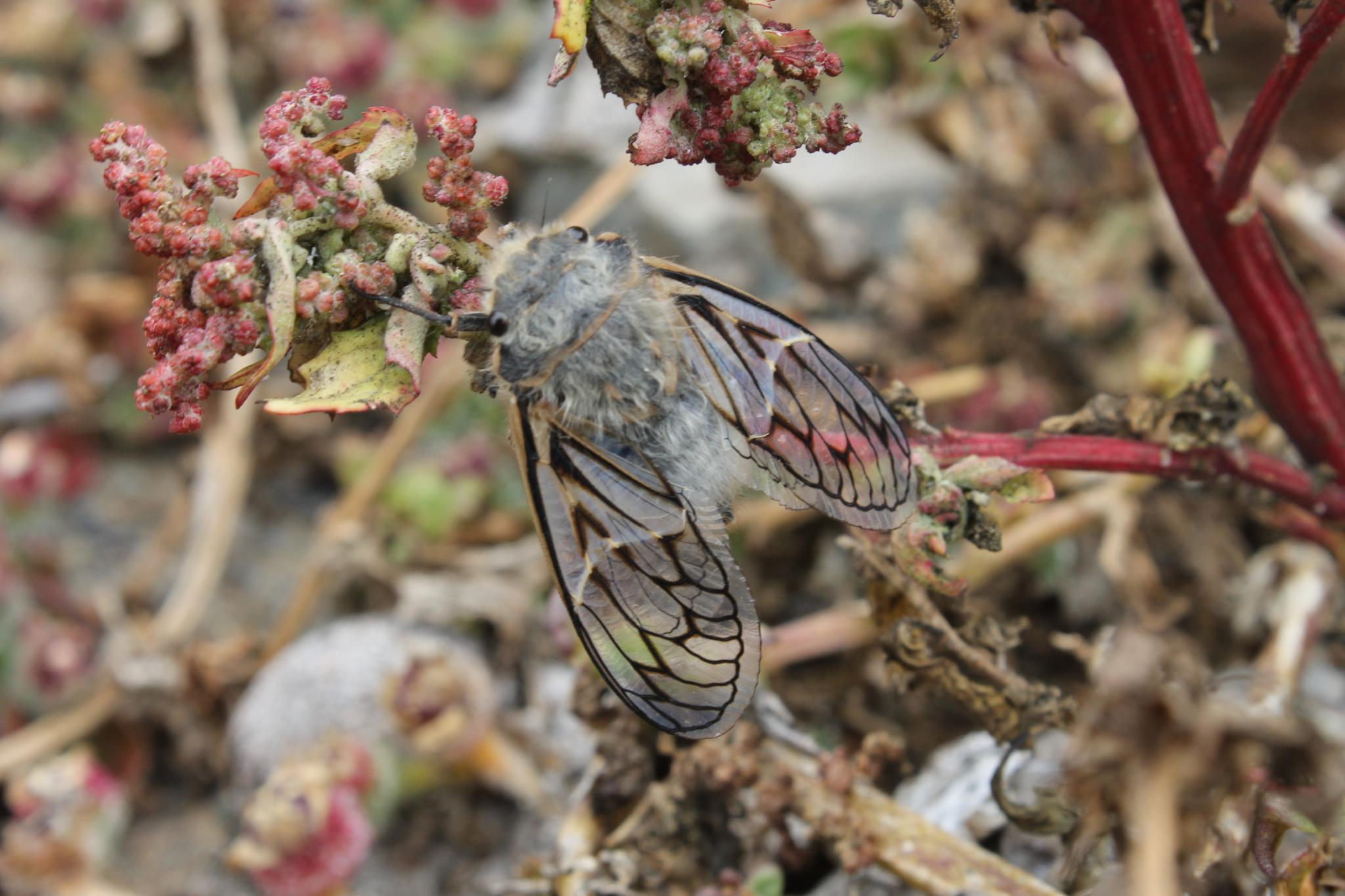
- Tettigades chilensis

Scientific classification
- Domain: Eukaryota
- Kingdom: Animalia
- Phylum: Arthropoda
- Class: Insecta
- Order: Hemiptera
- Suborder: Auchenorrhyncha
- Superfamily: Cicadoidea
- Family: Cicadidae
- Subfamily: Tibicininae
- Tribe: Tettigadini; Distant, 1905

= Tettigadini =

Tribe of true bugs

Tettigadini is a tribe of cicadas in the family Cicadidae. There are about 11 genera and at least 50 described species in Tettigadini, found in the Neotropics.

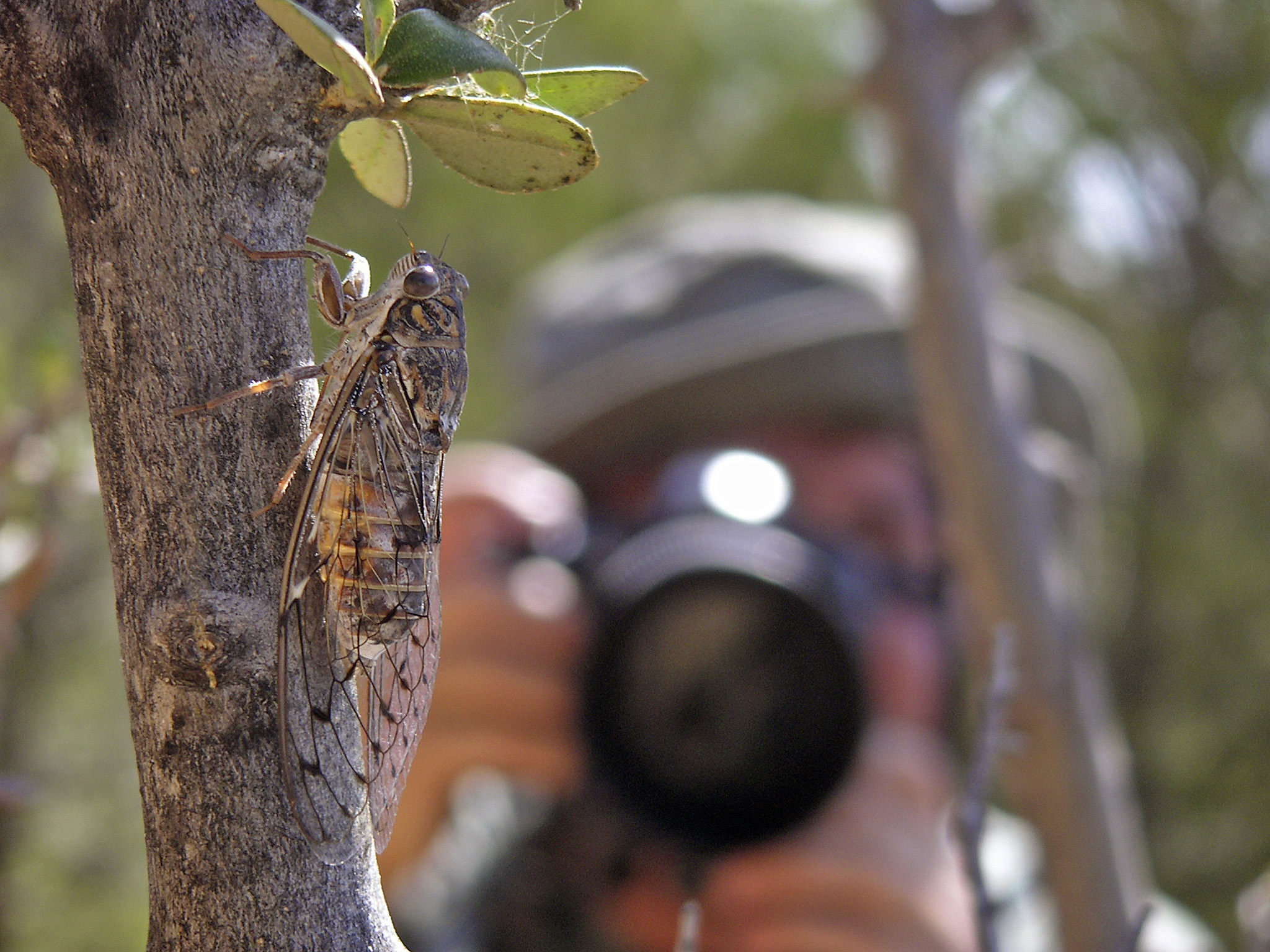
Tettigades chilensis

== Genera ==
These 11 genera belong to the tribe Tettigadini:

- Acuticephala Torres, 1958
- Alarcta Torres, 1958
- Babras Jacobi, 1907
- Calliopsida Torres, 1958
- Chonosia Distant, 1905
- Coata Distant, 1906
- Mendozana Distant, 1906
- Psephenotettix Torres, 1958
- Tettigades Amyot & Audinet-Serville, 1843
- Tettigotoma Torres, 1942
- Torrescada Sanborn & Heath, 2017
