= Clidophleps vagans =

Scientific classification
- Domain: Eukaryota
- Kingdom: Animalia
- Phylum: Arthropoda
- Class: Insecta
- Order: Hemiptera
- Suborder: Auchenorrhyncha
- Family: Cicadidae
- Genus: Clidophleps
- Species: C. vagans

Binomial name
- Clidophleps vagans Davis, 1925

Species of true bug

Clidophleps vagans is a species of cicada in the family Cicadidae. It is found in North America.
