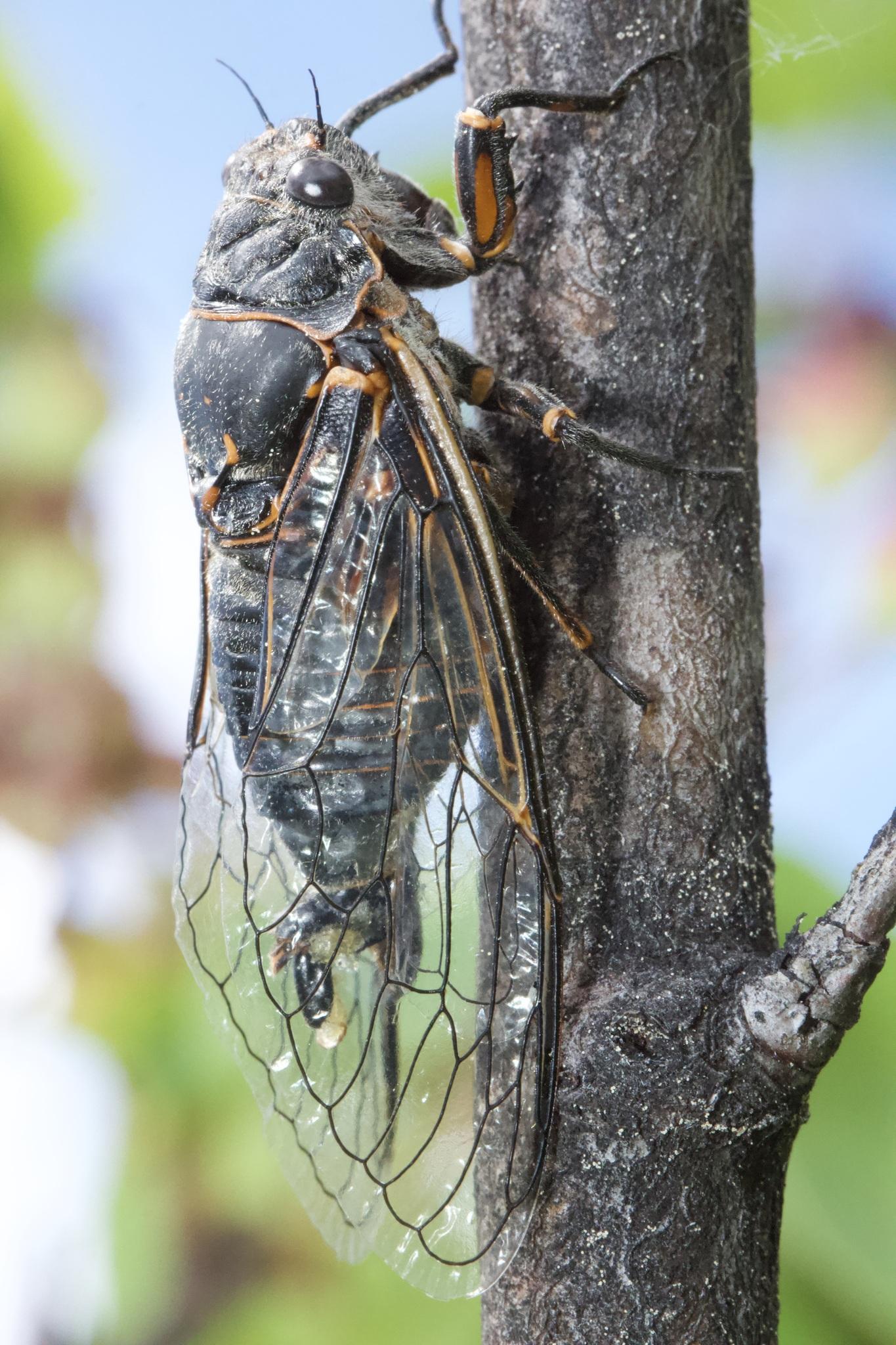

Scientific classification
- Kingdom: Animalia
- Phylum: Arthropoda
- Clade: Pancrustacea
- Class: Insecta
- Order: Hemiptera
- Suborder: Auchenorrhyncha
- Family: Cicadidae
- Genus: Okanagana
- Species: O. occidentalis

Binomial name
- Okanagana occidentalis (Walker in Lord, 1866)

= Okanagana occidentalis =

Species of true bug

Okanagana occidentalis is a species of cicada in the family Cicadidae. It is found in North America.
