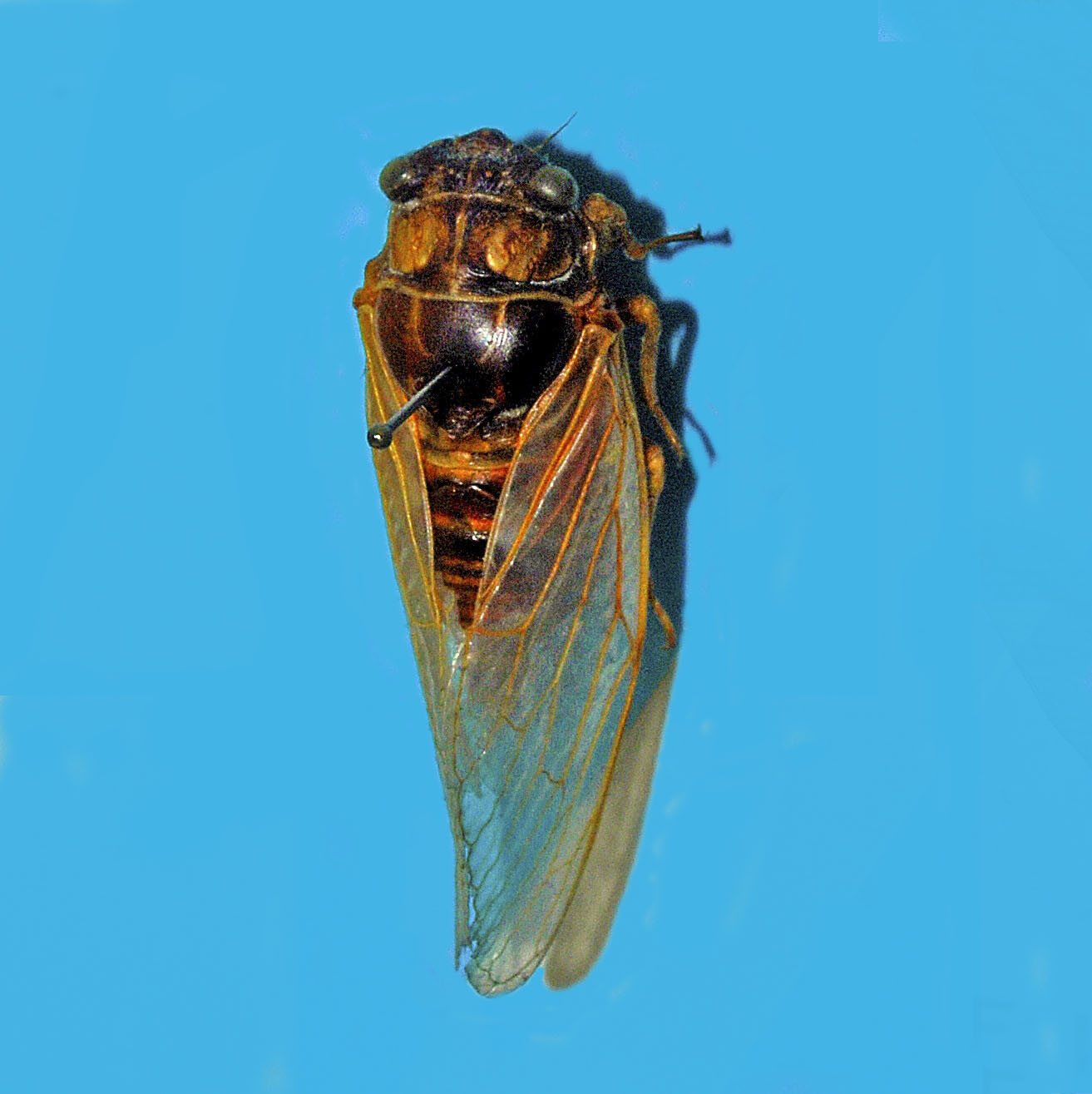
- Tibicina haematodes

Scientific classification
- Kingdom: Animalia
- Phylum: Arthropoda
- Clade: Pancrustacea
- Class: Insecta
- Order: Hemiptera
- Suborder: Auchenorrhyncha
- Family: Cicadidae
- Tribe: Tibicinini
- Genus: Tibicina; Kolenati, 1857

= Tibicina =

Genus of true bugs

Tibicina is a genus of cicadas belonging to the family Cicadidae, subfamily Tibicininae.

== Species ==
Species within this genus include:

- Tibicina cisticola (Hagen, 1855)
- Tibicina contentei (Boulard, 1982)
- Tibicina corsica (Rambur, 1840)
- Tibicina fairmairei Boulard, 1984
- Tibicina garricola Boulard, 1983
- Tibicina haematodes (Scopoli, 1763)
- Tibicina longisyllaba Hertach, 2021
- Tibicina luctuosa (A. Costa, 1883)
- Tibicina nigronervosa Fieber, 1876
- Tibicina picta (Fabricius, 1794)
- Tibicina quadrisignata (Hagen, 1855)
- Tibicina steveni (Krynicki, 1837)
- Tibicina tomentosa (Olivier, 1790)
- Tibicina serhadensis
