= Clidophleps distanti =

Scientific classification
- Domain: Eukaryota
- Kingdom: Animalia
- Phylum: Arthropoda
- Class: Insecta
- Order: Hemiptera
- Suborder: Auchenorrhyncha
- Family: Cicadidae
- Genus: Clidophleps
- Species: C. distanti

Binomial name
- Clidophleps distanti (Van Duzee, 1914)

Species of true bug

Clidophleps distanti is a species of cicada in the family Cicadidae. It is found in Central America and North America.

== Subspecies ==
These two subspecies belong to the species Clidophleps distanti:

- Clidophleps distanti distanti (Van Duzee, 1914)
- Clidophleps distanti truncata (Van Duzee, 1914)
