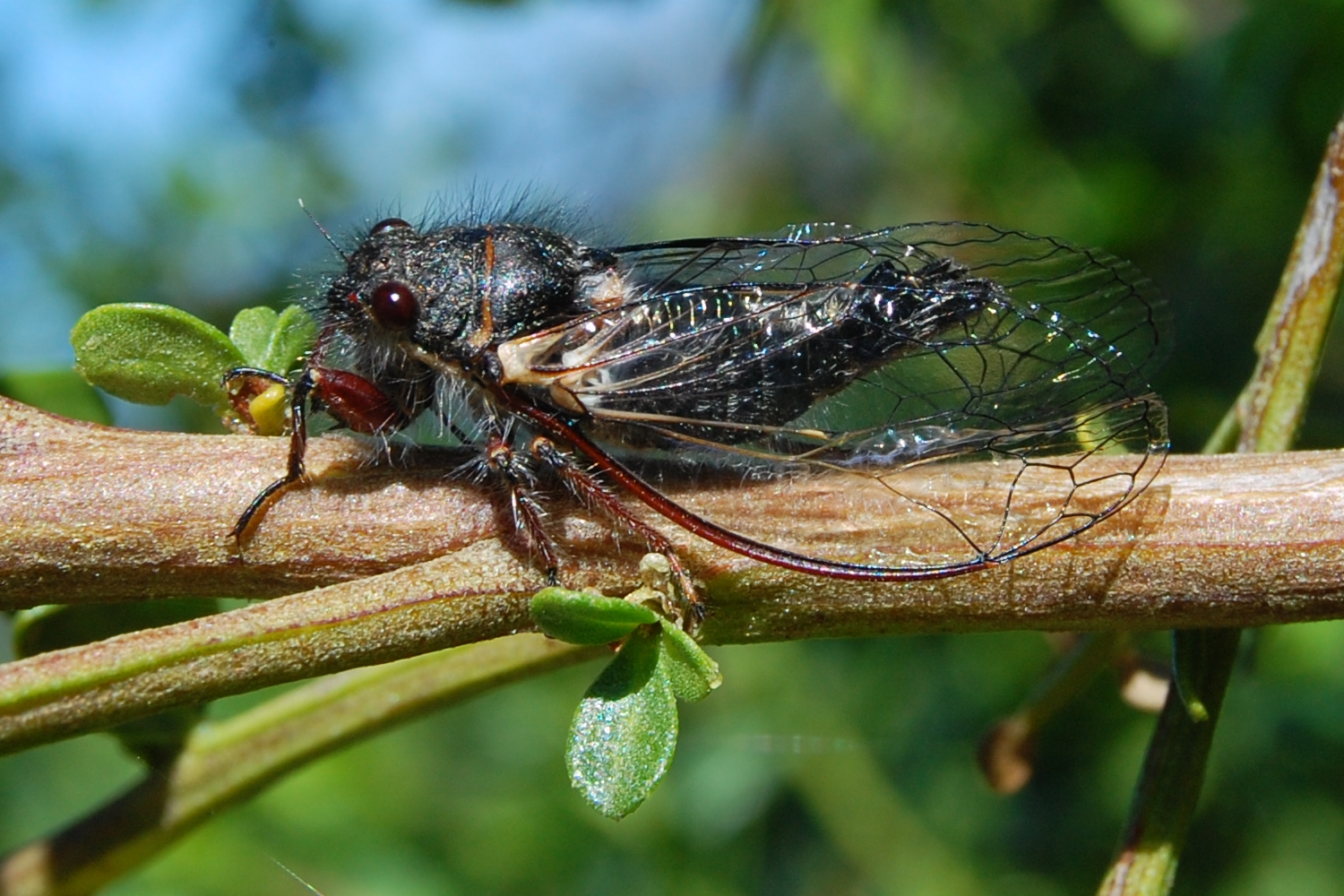

Scientific classification
- Domain: Eukaryota
- Kingdom: Animalia
- Phylum: Arthropoda
- Class: Insecta
- Order: Hemiptera
- Suborder: Auchenorrhyncha
- Family: Cicadidae
- Genus: Platypedia
- Species: P. minor

Binomial name
- Platypedia minor Uhler, 1888

= Platypedia minor =

Species of true bug

Platypedia minor is a species of cicada in the family Cicadidae. It is found in Central America and North America.
