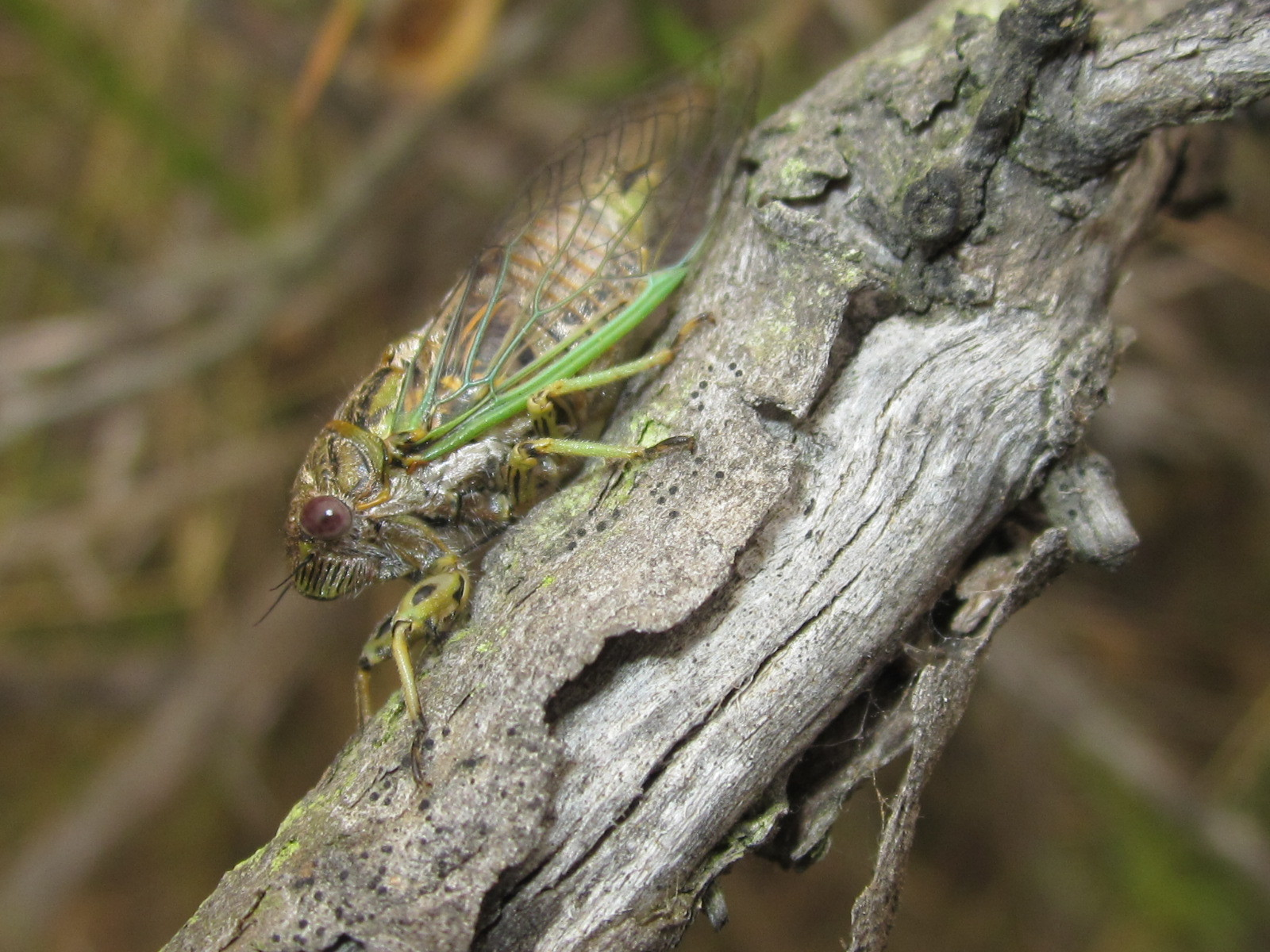
- Chilecicada occidentis

Scientific classification
- Domain: Eukaryota
- Kingdom: Animalia
- Phylum: Arthropoda
- Class: Insecta
- Order: Hemiptera
- Suborder: Auchenorrhyncha
- Superfamily: Cicadoidea
- Family: Cicadidae
- Subfamily: Tibicininae
- Tribe: Chilecicadini
- Genus: Chilecicada; Sanborn, 2014

= Chilecicada =

Genus of true bugs

Chilecicada is a genus of cicadas in the family Cicadidae, found in South America. There is at least one described species in Chilecicada, C. occidentis.

Chilecicada is the only genus of the tribe Chilecicadini.
