= Neoplatypedia constricta =

Scientific classification
- Domain: Eukaryota
- Kingdom: Animalia
- Phylum: Arthropoda
- Class: Insecta
- Order: Hemiptera
- Suborder: Auchenorrhyncha
- Family: Cicadidae
- Genus: Neoplatypedia
- Species: N. constricta

Binomial name
- Neoplatypedia constricta Davis, 1920

Species of true bug

Neoplatypedia constricta is a species of cicada in the family Cicadidae. It is found in North America.
