= Platypedia bernardinoensis =

Scientific classification
- Domain: Eukaryota
- Kingdom: Animalia
- Phylum: Arthropoda
- Class: Insecta
- Order: Hemiptera
- Suborder: Auchenorrhyncha
- Family: Cicadidae
- Genus: Platypedia
- Species: P. bernardinoensis

Binomial name
- Platypedia bernardinoensis Davis, 1932

Species of true bug

Platypedia bernardinoensis is a species of cicada in the family Cicadidae. It is found in North America.
