= Platypedia mohavensis =

Scientific classification
- Domain: Eukaryota
- Kingdom: Animalia
- Phylum: Arthropoda
- Class: Insecta
- Order: Hemiptera
- Suborder: Auchenorrhyncha
- Family: Cicadidae
- Genus: Platypedia
- Species: P. mohavensis

Binomial name
- Platypedia mohavensis Davis, 1920

Synonyms
- Platypedia latipennis Davis, 1921

Species of true bug

Platypedia mohavensis is a species of cicada in the family Cicadidae. It is found in North America.

== Subspecies ==
These two subspecies belong to the species Platypedia mohavensis:

- Platypedia mohavensis mohavensis Davis, 1920
- Platypedia mohavensis rufescens Davis, 1932
