= Okanagodes gracilis =

Scientific classification
- Domain: Eukaryota
- Kingdom: Animalia
- Phylum: Arthropoda
- Class: Insecta
- Order: Hemiptera
- Suborder: Auchenorrhyncha
- Family: Cicadidae
- Genus: Okanagodes
- Species: O. gracilis

Binomial name
- Okanagodes gracilis Davis, 1919

Species of true bug

Okanagodes gracilis is a species of cicada in the family Cicadidae. It is found in Central America and North America.

== Subspecies ==
These two subspecies belong to the species Okanagodes gracilis:

- Okanagodes gracilis gracilis Davis, 1919
- Okanagodes gracilis viridis Davis, 1934
