= Selymbria (cicada) =

Scientific classification
- Kingdom: Animalia
- Phylum: Arthropoda
- Clade: Pancrustacea
- Class: Insecta
- Order: Hemiptera
- Suborder: Auchenorrhyncha
- Superfamily: Cicadoidea
- Family: Cicadidae
- Subfamily: Tibicininae
- Tribe: Selymbriini
- Genus: Selymbria; Stål, 1861

Genus of true bugs

Selymbria is a genus of cicadas in the family Cicadidae, found in the Neotropics. There are about six described species in Selymbria.

Selymbria is the only genus of the tribe Selymbriini.

== Species ==
These six species belong to the genus Selymbria:

- Selymbria ahyetios Ramos and Wolda, 1985
- Selymbria danieleae Sanborn, 2011
- Selymbria pandora Distant, 1911
- Selymbria pluvialis Ramos and Wolda, 1985
- Selymbria stigmatica (Germar, 1834)
- Selymbria subolivacea (Stål, 1862)
