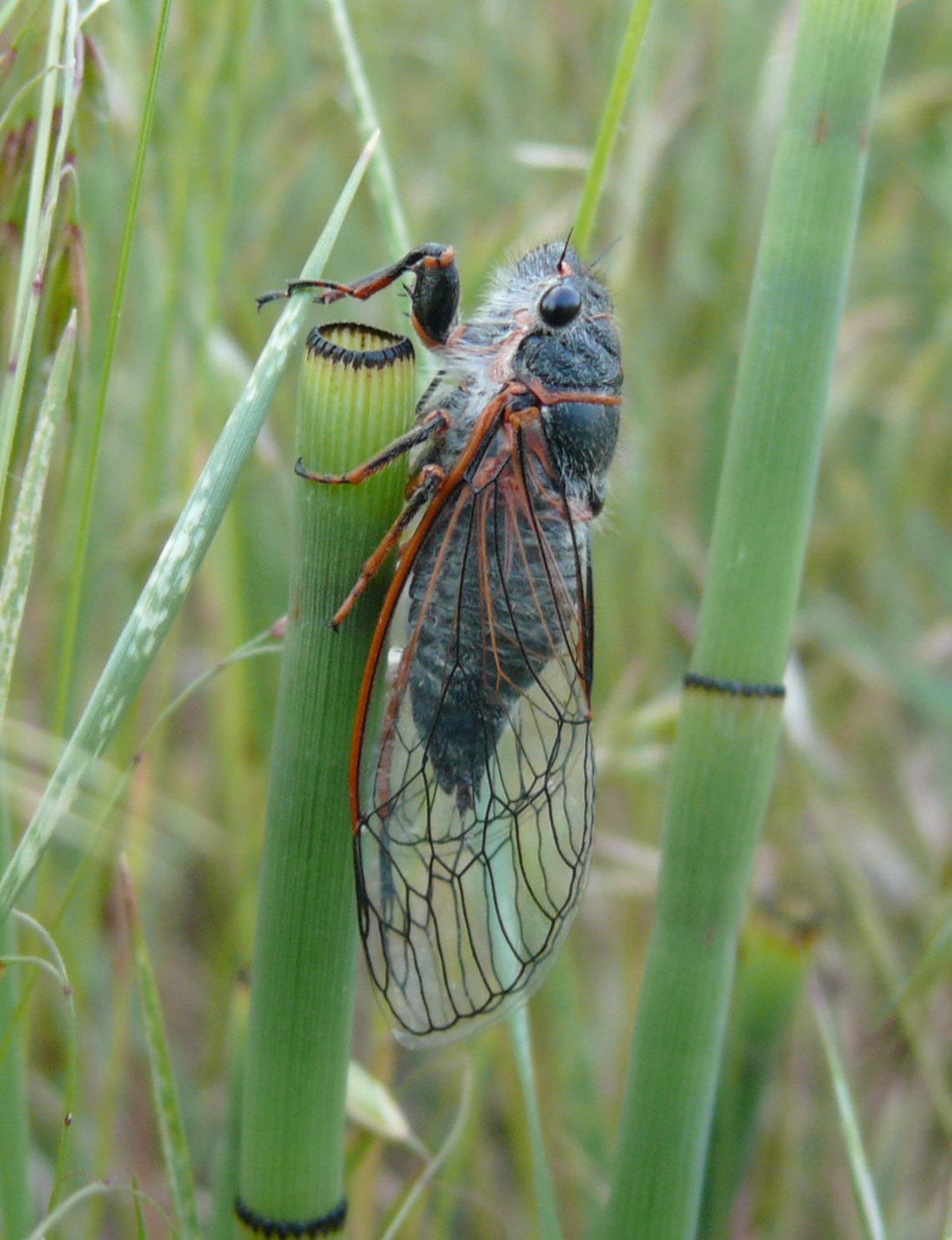

Scientific classification
- Domain: Eukaryota
- Kingdom: Animalia
- Phylum: Arthropoda
- Class: Insecta
- Order: Hemiptera
- Suborder: Auchenorrhyncha
- Family: Cicadidae
- Genus: Platypedia
- Species: P. putnami

Binomial name
- Platypedia putnami (Uhler, 1877)

= Platypedia putnami =

Species of true bug

Platypedia putnami is a species of cicada in the family Cicadidae. It is found in North America.

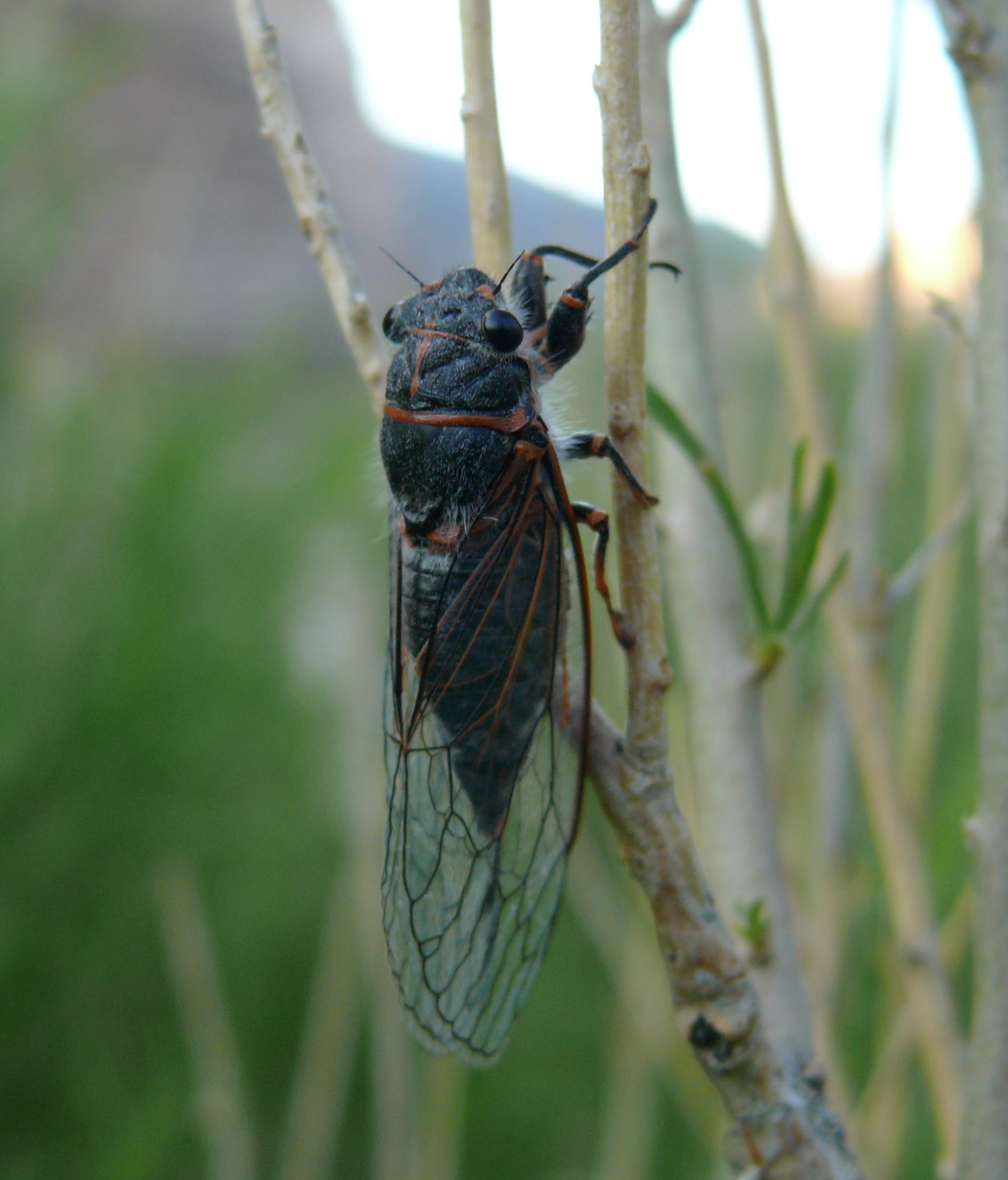

== Subspecies ==
These four subspecies belong to the species Platypedia putnami:

- Platypedia putnami keddiensis Davis, 1920
- Platypedia putnami lutea Davis, 1920
- Platypedia putnami occidentalis Davis, 1920
- Platypedia putnami putnami (Uhler, 1877)
