= Okanagana arboraria =

Scientific classification
- Domain: Eukaryota
- Kingdom: Animalia
- Phylum: Arthropoda
- Class: Insecta
- Order: Hemiptera
- Suborder: Auchenorrhyncha
- Family: Cicadidae
- Genus: Okanagana
- Species: O. arboraria

Binomial name
- Okanagana arboraria Wymore, 1934

Synonyms
- Okanagana arboraria var. crocea Wymore, 1934

Species of true bug

Okanagana arboraria is a species of cicada in the family Cicadidae. It is endemic to the Sacramento River valley of California .
