= Neoplatypedia =

Scientific classification
- Domain: Eukaryota
- Kingdom: Animalia
- Phylum: Arthropoda
- Class: Insecta
- Order: Hemiptera
- Suborder: Auchenorrhyncha
- Family: Cicadidae
- Genus: Neoplatypedia; Davis, 1920

Genus of true bugs

Neoplatypedia is a genus of cicadas in the family Cicadidae. There are at least two described species in Neoplatypedia.

== Species ==
- Neoplatypedia ampliata (Van Duzee, 1915)
- Neoplatypedia constricta Davis, 1920
