= Clidophleps =

Scientific classification
- Kingdom: Animalia
- Phylum: Arthropoda
- Class: Insecta
- Order: Hemiptera
- Suborder: Auchenorrhyncha
- Superfamily: Cicadoidea
- Family: Cicadidae
- Genus: Clidophleps; Van Duzee, 1915

Genus of true bugs

Clidophleps is a genus of cicadas in the family Cicadidae. There are about eight described species in Clidophleps.

== Species ==
These eight species belong to the genus Clidophleps:

- Clidophleps astigma Davis, 1917
- Clidophleps beameri Davis, 1936
- Clidophleps blaisdellii (Uhler, 1892)
- Clidophleps distanti (Van Duzee, 1914)
- Clidophleps rotundifrons (Davis, 1916)
- Clidophleps tenuis Davis, 1927
- Clidophleps vagans Davis, 1925
- Clidophleps wrighti Davis, 1926
