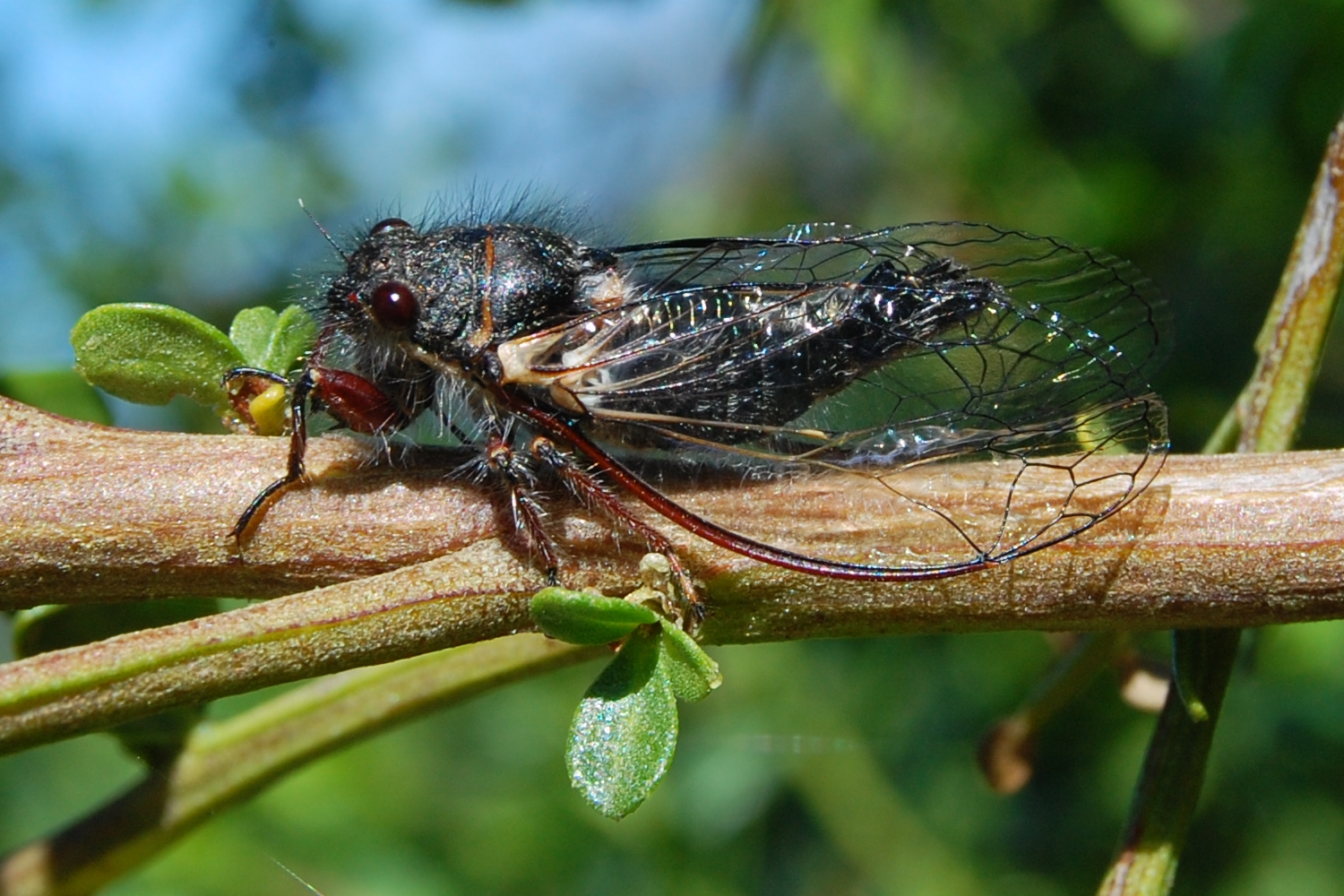
- Platypedia minor

Scientific classification
- Domain: Eukaryota
- Kingdom: Animalia
- Phylum: Arthropoda
- Class: Insecta
- Order: Hemiptera
- Suborder: Auchenorrhyncha
- Superfamily: Cicadoidea
- Family: Cicadidae
- Genus: Platypedia; Uhler, 1888

= Platypedia =

Genus of true bugs

Platypedia is a genus of cicadas in the family Cicadidae. There are more than 20 described species in Platypedia.

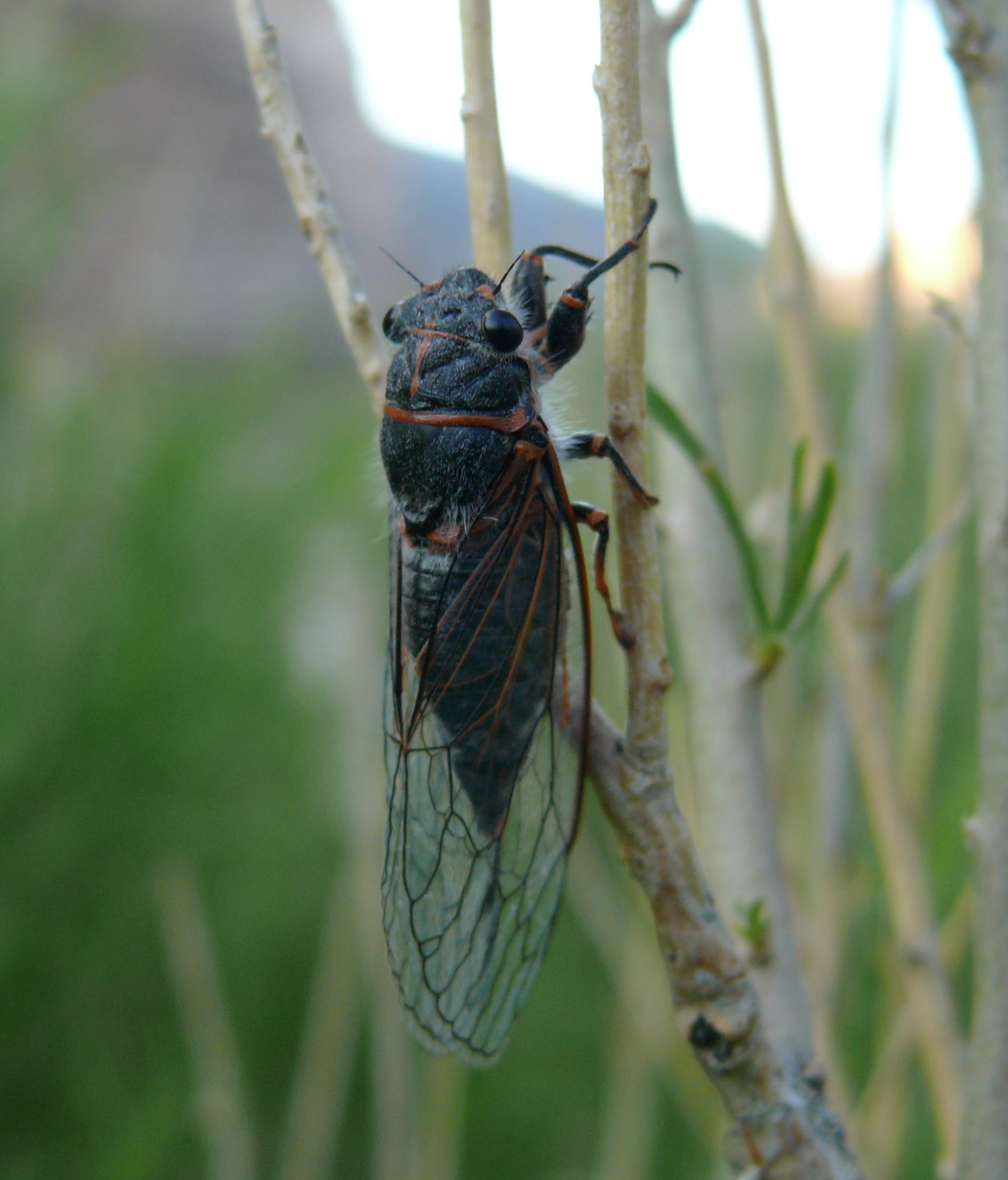
Platypedia putnami

== Species ==
These 24 species belong to the genus Platypedia:

- Platypedia affinis Davis, 1939
- Platypedia aperta Van Duzee, 1915
- Platypedia areolata (Uhler, 1861) (salmonfly)
- Platypedia australis Davis, 1941
- Platypedia balli Davis, 1936
- Platypedia barbata Davis, 1920
- Platypedia bernardinoensis Davis, 1932
- Platypedia falcata Davis, 1920
- Platypedia gressitti Kato, 1932
- Platypedia intermedia Van Duzee, 1915
- Platypedia laticapitata Davis, 1921
- Platypedia mariposa Davis, 1935
- Platypedia middlekauffi Simons, 1953
- Platypedia minor Uhler, 1888
- Platypedia mohavensis Davis, 1920
- Platypedia primigenia Cockerell & T.D.A., 1908
- Platypedia putnami (Uhler, 1877)
- Platypedia rufipes Davis, 1920
- Platypedia scotti Davis, 1935
- Platypedia similis Davis, 1920
- Platypedia sylvesteri Simons, 1953
- Platypedia tomentosa Davis, 1942
- Platypedia usingeri Simons, 1953
- Platypedia vanduzeei Davis, 1920
