= Okanagodes =

Scientific classification
- Domain: Eukaryota
- Kingdom: Animalia
- Phylum: Arthropoda
- Class: Insecta
- Order: Hemiptera
- Suborder: Auchenorrhyncha
- Superfamily: Cicadoidea
- Family: Cicadidae
- Genus: Okanagodes; Davis, 1919

Genus of true bugs

Okanagodes is a genus of cicadas in the family Cicadidae. There are at least two described species in Okanagodes.

== Species ==
These two species belong to the genus Okanagodes:

- Okanagodes gracilis Davis, 1919
- Okanagodes terlingua Davis, 1932
