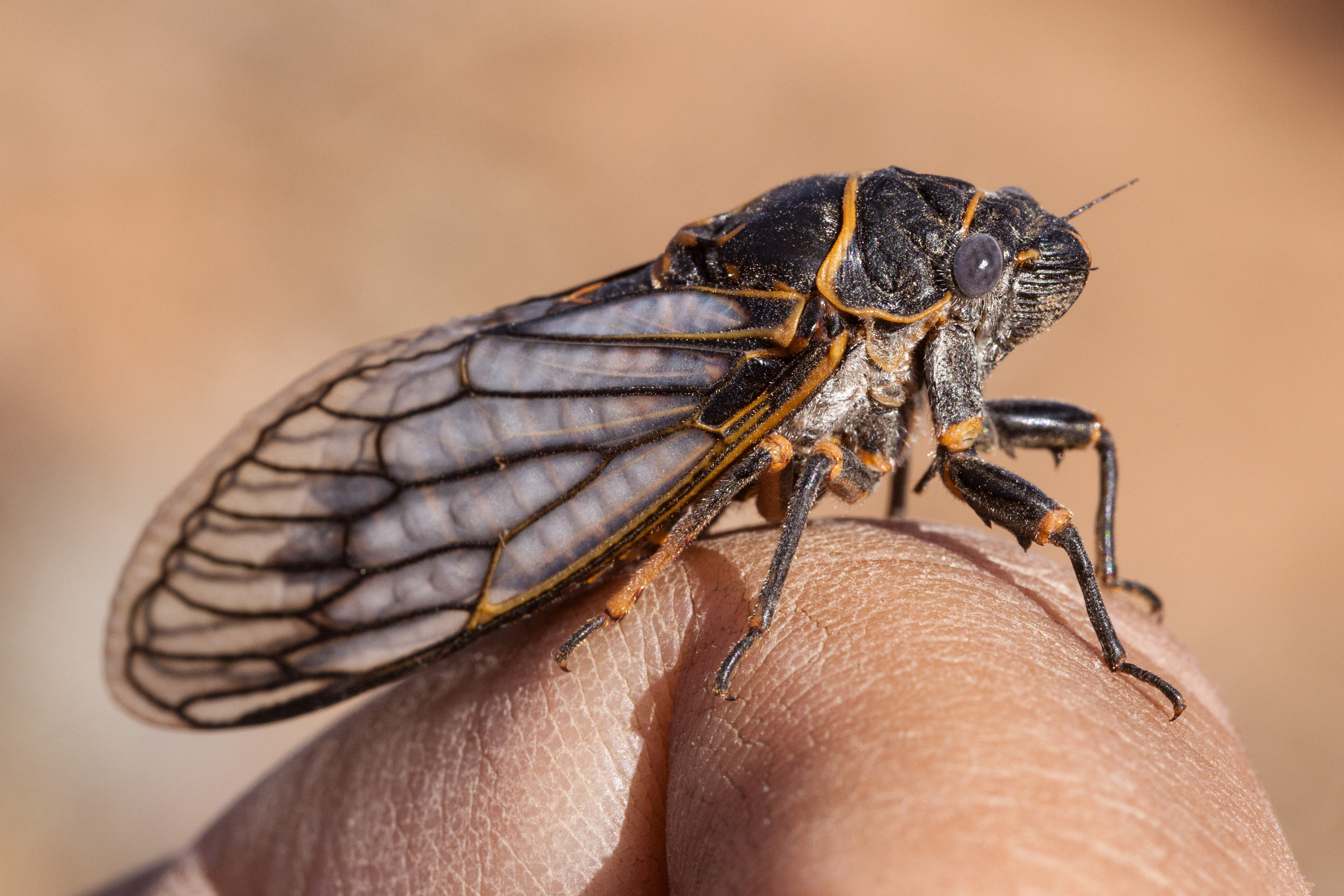
- Okanagana fumipennis

Scientific classification
- Kingdom: Animalia
- Phylum: Arthropoda
- Class: Insecta
- Order: Hemiptera
- Suborder: Auchenorrhyncha
- Family: Cicadidae
- Tribe: Tibicinini
- Genus: Okanagana; Distant, 1905

= Okanagana =

Genus of true bugs

Okanagana is a genus of cicadas in the family Cicadidae. There are 45 described species in Okanagana.

== Species ==
These 45 species belong to the genus Okanagana:

- Okanagana annulata Davis, 1935
- Okanagana arboraria Wymore, 1934
- Okanagana arctostaphylae Van Duzee, 1915
- Okanagana aurantiaca Davis, 1917
- Okanagana aurora Davis, 1936
- Okanagana balli Davis, 1919
- Okanagana bella Davis, 1919 (mountain cicada)
- Okanagana canescens Van Duzee, 1915
- Okanagana cruentifera (Uhler, 1892)
- Okanagana ferrugomaculata Davis, 1936
- Okanagana formosa Davis, 1926
- Okanagana fratercula Davis, 1915
- Okanagana fumipennis Davis, 1932
- Okanagana georgi Heath and Sanborn, 2007
- Okanagana gibbera Davis, 1927
- Okanagana hirsuta Davis, 1915
- Okanagana luteobasalis Davis, 1935
- Okanagana magnifica Davis, 1919
- Okanagana mariposa
  - Okanagana mariposa mariposa Davis, 1915
  - Okanagana mariposa oregonensis Davis, 1939
- Okanagana napa Davis, 1919
- Okanagana nigrodorsata Davis, 1923
- Okanagana noveboracensis (Emmons, 1854)
- Okanagana occidentalis (Walker in Lord, 1866)
- Okanagana opacipennis Davis, 1926
- Okanagana oregona Davis, 1916
- Okanagana orithyia Bliven, 1964
- Okanagana ornata Van Duzee, 1915
- Okanagana rhadine Bliven, 1964
- Okanagana rimosa (Say, 1830) (Say's cicada)
  - Okanagana rimosa ohioensis Davis, 1942 (Say's cicada)
- Okanagana rubrobasalis Davis, 1926
- Okanagana salicicola Bliven, 1964
- Okanagana schaefferi Davis, 1915
- Okanagana sequoiae Bliven, 1964
- Okanagana sperata Van Duzee, 1935
- Okanagana sugdeni Davis, 1938
- Okanagana synodica
  - Okanagana synodica synodica (Say, 1825) (walking cicada)
  - Okanagana synodica nigra Davis, 1944
- Okanagana tanneri Davis, 1930
- Okanagana triangulata Davis, 1915
- Okanagana tristis Van Duzee, 1915
- Okanagana vandykei Van Duzee, 1915
- Okanagana venusta Davis, 1935
- Okanagana villosa Davis, 1941
- Okanagana vocalis Bliven, 1964
- Okanagana wymorei Davis, 1935
- Okanagana yakimaensis Davis, 1939
