= Tibicinini =

Scientific classification
- Domain: Eukaryota
- Kingdom: Animalia
- Phylum: Arthropoda
- Class: Insecta
- Order: Hemiptera
- Suborder: Auchenorrhyncha
- Superfamily: Cicadoidea
- Family: Cicadidae
- Subfamily: Tibicininae
- Tribe: Tibicinini; Distant, 1905

Tribe of true bugs

Tibicinini is a tribe of cicadas in the family Cicadidae. There are at least 100 described species in Tibicinini, found in the Holarctic.

== Genera ==
The following genera belong to the tribe Tibicinini:

1. Chlorocanta Chatfield-Taylor, 2023
2. Clidophleps Van Duzee, 1915
3. Gibbocicada Ruschel, 2018
4. Hewlettia Smeds, 2023
5. Okanagana Distant, 1905
6. Okanagodes Davis, 1919
7. Paharia Distant, 1905
8. Subpsaltria Chen, 1943
9. Subtibicina Lee, 2012
10. Tibicina Kolenati, 1857
11. Tibicinoides Distant, 1914
