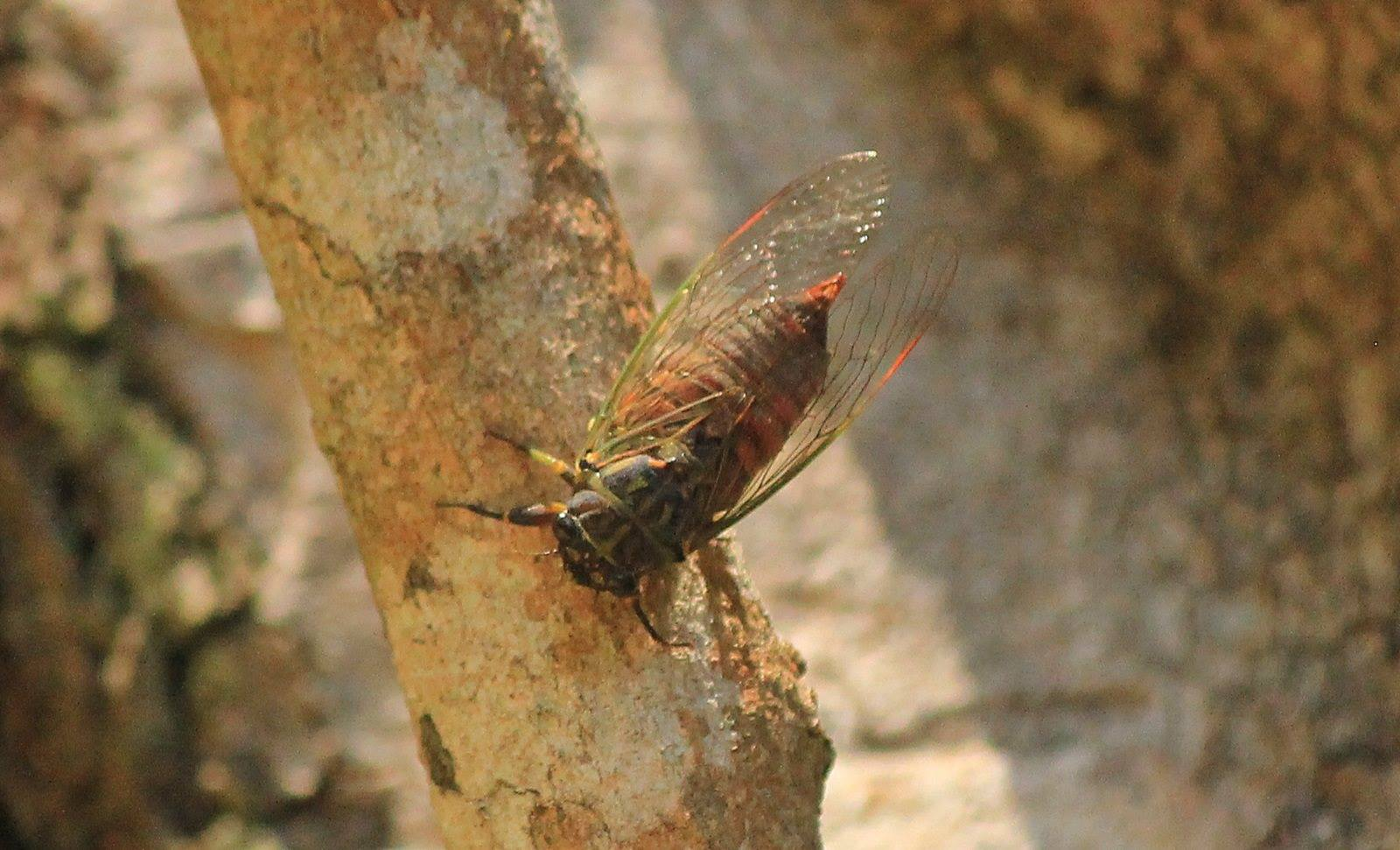
- Quintilia rufiventris

Scientific classification
- Domain: Eukaryota
- Kingdom: Animalia
- Phylum: Arthropoda
- Class: Insecta
- Order: Hemiptera
- Suborder: Auchenorrhyncha
- Family: Cicadidae
- Subfamily: Tettigomyiinae; Distant 1905

Tribes
- Lacetasini Moulds & Marshall, 2018; Malagasiini Moulds & Marshall, 2018; Tettigomyiini Distant, 1905; Ydiellini Boulard, 1973

= Tettigomyiinae =

Subfamily of true bugs

Tettigomyiinae is a subfamily of cicadas in the family Cicadidae, found in tropical Africa. There are about 16 genera and at least 100 described species in Tettigomyiinae.

The tribes Tettigomyiini and Ydiellini were recently transferred to this subfamily from Cicadettinae.

== Genera ==
These 16 genera belong to the subfamily Tettigomyiinae:

- Bavea Distant, 1905
- Gazuma Distant, 1905
- Lacetas Karsch, 1890
- Ligymolpa Karsch, 1890
- Malagasia Distant, 1882
- Malgachialna Boulard, 1980
- Maroboduus Distant, 1920
- Nablistes Karsch, 1891
- Nyara Villet, 1999
- Paectira Karsch, 1890
- Quintilia Stål, 1866
- Spoerryana Boulard, 1974
- Stagea Villet, 1995
- Stagira Stål, 1862
- Tettigomyia Amyot & Serville, 1843
- Xosopsaltria Kirkaldy, 1904
