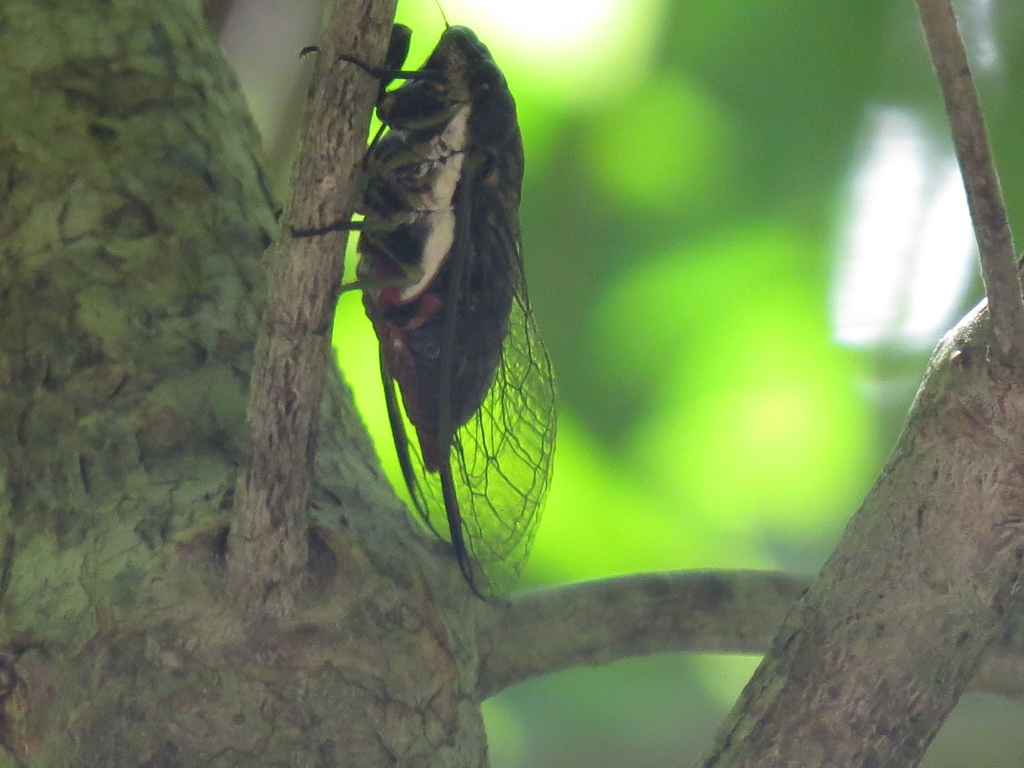
- Quintilia rufiventris

Scientific classification
- Domain: Eukaryota
- Kingdom: Animalia
- Phylum: Arthropoda
- Class: Insecta
- Order: Hemiptera
- Suborder: Auchenorrhyncha
- Superfamily: Cicadoidea
- Family: Cicadidae
- Subfamily: Tettigomyiinae
- Tribe: Malagasiini; Moulds & Marshall, 2018

= Malagasiini =

Tribe of true bugs

Malagasiini is a tribe of cicadas in the family Cicadidae, found in Africa and Madagascar. There are about 5 genera and at least 20 described species in Malagasiini.

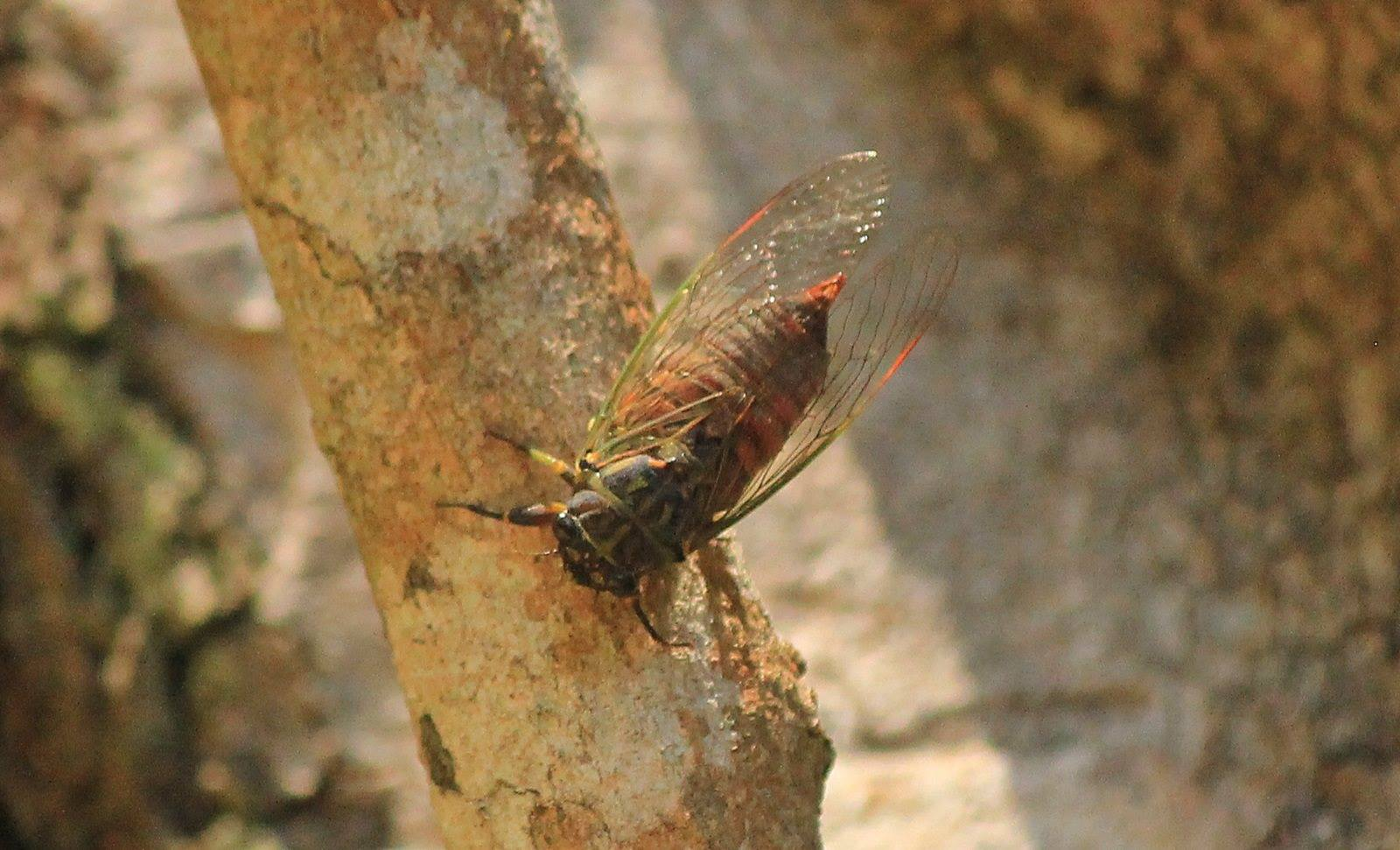
Quintilia rufiventris

== Genera ==
These five genera belong to the tribe Malagasiini:

- Ligymolpa Karsch, 1890
- Malagasia Distant, 1882
- Malgachialna Boulard, 1980
- Nyara Villet, 1999
- Quintilia Stål, 1866
