= Tettigomyiini =

Scientific classification
- Domain: Eukaryota
- Kingdom: Animalia
- Phylum: Arthropoda
- Class: Insecta
- Order: Hemiptera
- Suborder: Auchenorrhyncha
- Superfamily: Cicadoidea
- Family: Cicadidae
- Subfamily: Tettigomyiinae
- Tribe: Tettigomyiini; Distant, 1905

Tribe of true bugs

Tettigomyiini is a tribe of cicadas in the family Cicadidae, found in Africa and Madagascar. There are about 8 genera and at least 60 described species in Tettigomyiini.

== Genera ==
These eight genera belong to the tribe Tettigomyiini:

- Bavea Distant, 1905
- Gazuma Distant, 1905
- Paectira Karsch, 1890
- Spoerryana Boulard, 1974
- Stagea Villet, 1994
- Stagira Stål, 1861
- Tettigomyia Amyot & Audinet-Serville, 1843
- Xosopsaltria Kirkaldy, 1904
