= Stagira =

Stagira may refer to:

- Stagira (ancient city), in Greece
- Stagira (cicada), a genus of cicadas
- Stageira Chalkidikis, sometimes spelled 'Stagira', a modern city near the ruins of ancient Stagira
