= Ydiellini =

Scientific classification
- Domain: Eukaryota
- Kingdom: Animalia
- Phylum: Arthropoda
- Class: Insecta
- Order: Hemiptera
- Suborder: Auchenorrhyncha
- Superfamily: Cicadoidea
- Family: Cicadidae
- Subfamily: Tettigomyiinae
- Tribe: Ydiellini; Boulard, 1973

Tribe of true bugs

Ydiellini is a tribe of cicadas in the family Cicadidae, found in Africa. There are at least two genera and four described species in Ydiellini.

== Genera ==
These two genera belong to the tribe Ydiellini:

- Maroboduus Distant, 1920
- Nablistes Karsch, 1891
