= Hemidictyini =

Scientific classification
- Kingdom: Animalia
- Phylum: Arthropoda
- Clade: Pancrustacea
- Class: Insecta
- Order: Hemiptera
- Suborder: Auchenorrhyncha
- Family: Cicadidae
- Subfamily: Cicadettinae
- Tribe: Hemidictyini; Distant, 1905

Tribe of true bugs

Hemidictyini is a tribe of cicadas in the family Cicadidae, found in the Neotropics and tropical Africa. There are at least two genera and two described species in Hemidictyini.

== Genera ==
These genera belong to the tribe Hemidictyini:

- Hemidictya Burmeister, 1835^{i c g}
- Hovana Distant, 1905^{c g}

Data sources: i = ITIS, c = Catalogue of Life, g = GBIF, b = Bugguide.net

- Bafutalna Boulard, 1993
- Iruana Distant, 1905
- Lacetas Karsch, 1890
- Murphyalna Boulard, 2012
- Sapantanga Distant, 1905
