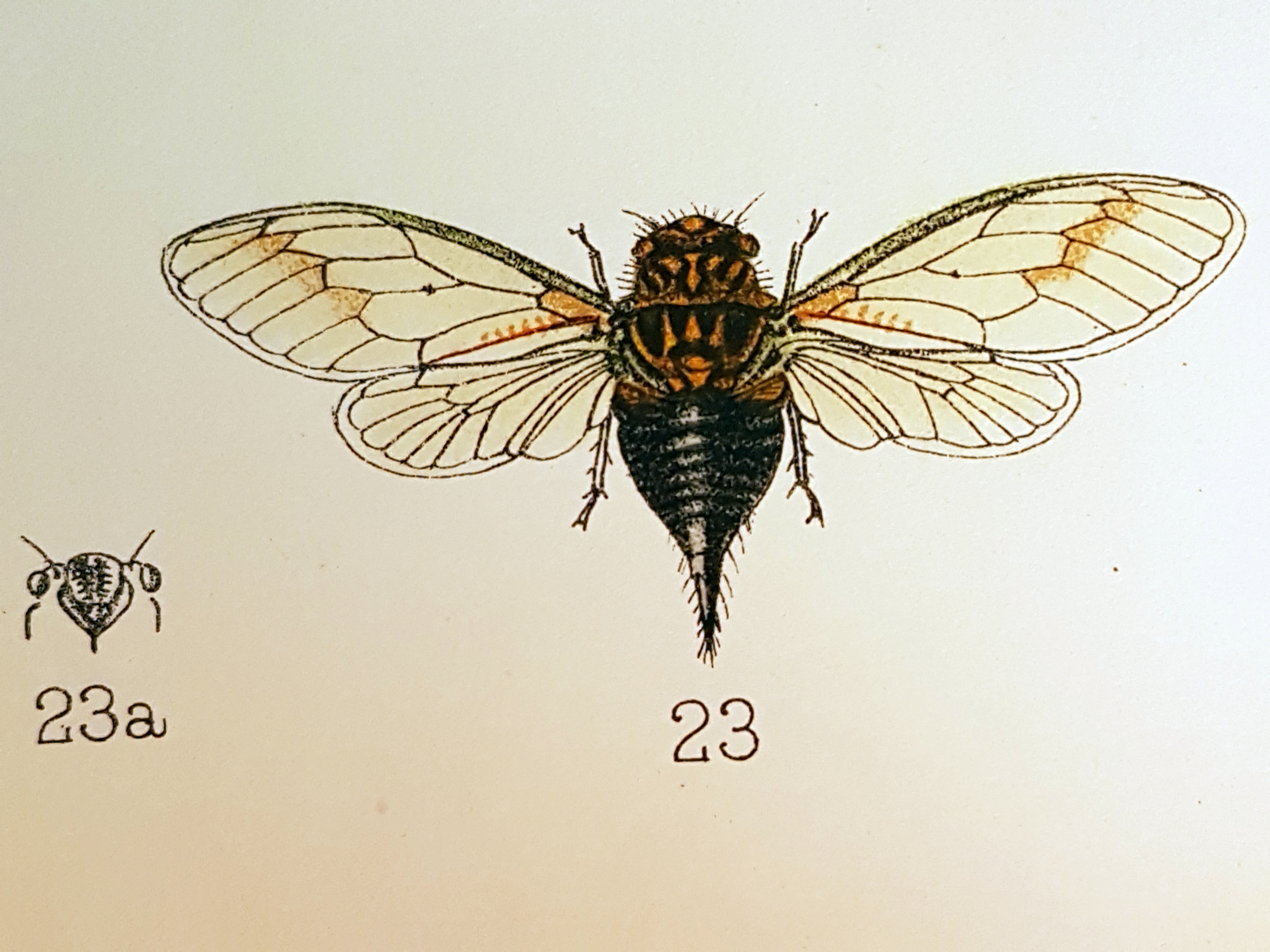
- Quintilia carinata

Scientific classification
- Kingdom: Animalia
- Phylum: Arthropoda
- Class: Insecta
- Order: Hemiptera
- Suborder: Auchenorrhyncha
- Family: Cicadidae
- Genus: Quintilia
- Species: Q. carinata

Binomial name
- Quintilia carinata (Thunberg, 1822)

Synonyms
- Tettigonia carinata Thunberg, 1822a:7; Cicada tristis Germar, 1834a:60 (Prim.hom.: Cicada tristis Fourcroy, 1785); Cicada nigroviridis Walker, F., 1852a:1130; Tibicen carinata Stål, 1861b:617; Tibicen nigroviridis Stål, 1862b:485; Tibicen (Quintilia) carinatus Stål, 1866a:31; Quintilia carinata Karsch, 1890b:117; Tibicen carinatus Distant, 1892a:248; Quintilia carinatus Sanborn, 2013a:430

= Quintilia carinata =

Species of true bug

Quintilia carinata is a species of cicada occurring in South Africa.
