= Lacetas =

Scientific classification
- Kingdom: Animalia
- Phylum: Arthropoda
- Class: Insecta
- Order: Hemiptera
- Suborder: Auchenorrhyncha
- Superfamily: Cicadoidea
- Family: Cicadidae
- Subfamily: Cicadettinae
- Tribe: Hemidictyini
- Genus: Lacetas; Karsch, 1890

Genus of true bugs

Lacetas is a genus of cicadas within the family Cicadidae and the tribe Hemidictyini, which is found in Africa. There are at least four described species in Lacetas.

== Species ==
These four species belong to the genus Lacetas:

- Lacetas annulicornis Karsch, 1890
- Lacetas breviceps Schumacher, 1912
- Lacetas jacobii Schumacher, 1912
- Lacetas longicollis Schumacher, 1912
