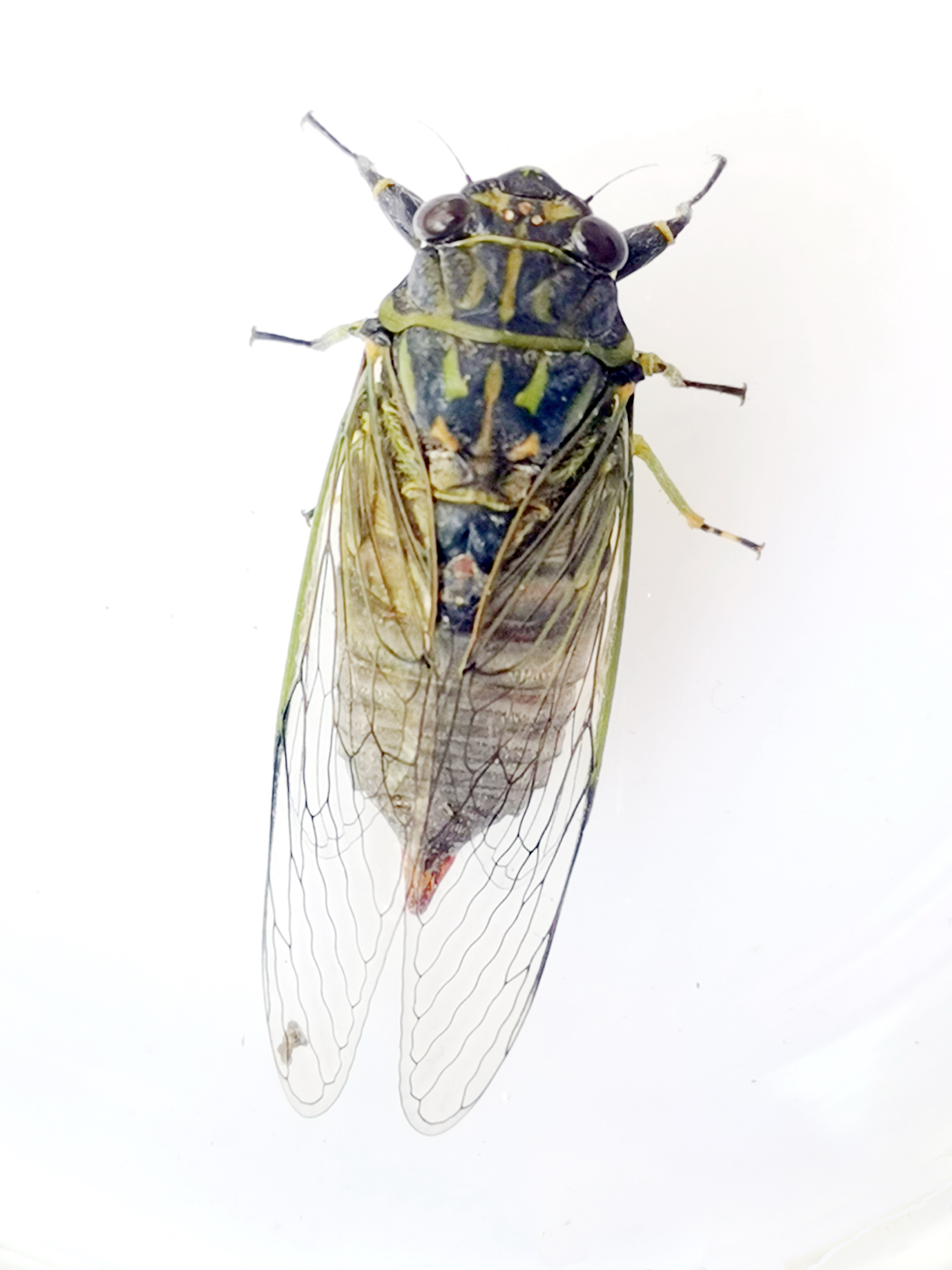

Scientific classification
- Kingdom: Animalia
- Phylum: Arthropoda
- Clade: Pancrustacea
- Class: Insecta
- Order: Hemiptera
- Suborder: Auchenorrhyncha
- Family: Cicadidae
- Subfamily: Tettigomyiinae
- Tribe: Anopercalnini
- Genus: Quintilia; Stål, 1866

= Quintilia =

Genus of true bugs

Quintilia is a genus of cicadas.

== Species ==
- Quintilia annulivena
- Quintilia aurora
- Quintilia carinata
- Quintilia catena
- Quintilia conspersa
- Quintilia dorsalis
- Quintilia frontalis
- Quintilia monilifera
- Quintilia musca
- Quintilia obliqua
- Quintilia pallidiventris
- Quintilia peregrina
- Quintilia primitiva
- Quintilia punctigera
- Quintilia rufiventris
- Quintilia semipunctata
- Quintilia umbrosa
- Quintilia vitripennis
- Quintilia vittativentris
- Quintilia walkeri
- Quintilia wealei Image
