= Nyara =

- Directed by: Ram Ally K.
- Screenplay by: Ram Ally K. Cece Mlay; Simon Rieber; Aanand Lonkar
- Starring: Bertha Abdallah; Rose Ndauka; Cojack Chilo; Denis Singano; Baraka Singano
- Cinematography: Aanand Lonkar
- Edited by: Rahul Kumar Singh
- Music by: Hariel Godius
- Production company: Wanene Films
- Release date: 30 December 2020
- Running time: 85 minutes
- Country: Tanzania
- Language: Kiswahili

Nyara, also known as Nyara: The Kidnapping, is a 2020 Tanzanian action film directed by Ram Ally K. It was selected as the 2020 Tanzanian entry for the Africa Movie Academy Awards at the 17th Africa Movie Academy Awards.

== Synopsis ==
Set in Tanzania, a young daughter who had returned home after being kidnapped by criminals who wanted to be paid money by the girl's family. The family manages to get help from a group of three young boys who call themselves Dragon boys and they manage to arrest the criminals.

== Cast ==
- Rose Ndauka
- Bertha Abdallah
- Cojack Chilo
- Denis Singano
- Baraka Singano

== Release ==
In addition to its theatrical domestic release, the film was also released in Kenya by Crimson Multimedia in February 2021.

== Accolades ==
Award / Film Festival	Category	Recipients and nominees	Result	Ref.
Africa Movie Academy Awards	Best Film	Darsh Pandit	Nominated	
Africa Movie Academy Awards	Best Director	Ram Ally K	Nominated	
Africa Movie Academy Awards	Best Cinematography	Aanand Lonkar	Nominated	
Africa Movie Academy Awards	Best Editing	Rahul Kumar Singh	Nominated	
Africa Movie Academy Awards	Best Production Design	Kifua Kompaund & Eliudi Dominic Mwanyika	Nominated	
Africa Movie Academy Awards	Best Original Soundtrack	Hariel Godius	Nominated	
Africa Movie Academy Awards	Best Young/ Promising Actor	Bertha Abdallah	Nominated	
Africa Movie Academy Awards	Best Film in an African Language	Ram Ally K	Nominated	
Eastern Nigeria International Film Festival 2021	Best Director	Ram Ally Kasongo	Won	
