= Malagasia (cicada) =

Scientific classification
- Domain: Eukaryota
- Kingdom: Animalia
- Phylum: Arthropoda
- Class: Insecta
- Order: Hemiptera
- Suborder: Auchenorrhyncha
- Family: Cicadidae
- Genus: Malagasia; Distant, 1882

Genus of true bugs

Malagasia is a genus of cicadas in the family Cicadidae. There are at least three described species in Malagasia.

== Species ==
These three species belong to the genus Malagasia:

- Malagasia aperta (Signoret, 1860)^{c g}
- Malagasia inflata Distant, 1882^{c g}
- Malagasia mariae Boulard, 1980^{c g}

Data sources: i = ITIS, c = Catalogue of Life, g = GBIF, b = Bugguide.net
