= Stagea (cicada) =

Scientific classification
- Domain: Eukaryota
- Kingdom: Animalia
- Phylum: Arthropoda
- Class: Insecta
- Order: Hemiptera
- Suborder: Auchenorrhyncha
- Family: Cicadidae
- Genus: Stagea

Genus of true bugs

Stagea is a genus of cicadas in the family Cicadidae. There is at least one described species in Stagea, S. platyptera.
