= Maroboduus (cicada) =

Scientific classification
- Domain: Eukaryota
- Kingdom: Animalia
- Phylum: Arthropoda
- Class: Insecta
- Order: Hemiptera
- Suborder: Auchenorrhyncha
- Family: Cicadidae
- Genus: Maroboduus

Genus of true bugs

Maroboduus is a genus of cicadas in the family Cicadidae. There are at least two described species in Maroboduus.

== Species ==
These two species belong to the genus Maroboduus:

- Maroboduus fractus Distant, 1920^{c g}
- Maroboduus maxicapsulifera (Boulard, 1986)^{c g}

Data sources: i = ITIS, c = Catalogue of Life, g = GBIF, b = Bugguide.net
