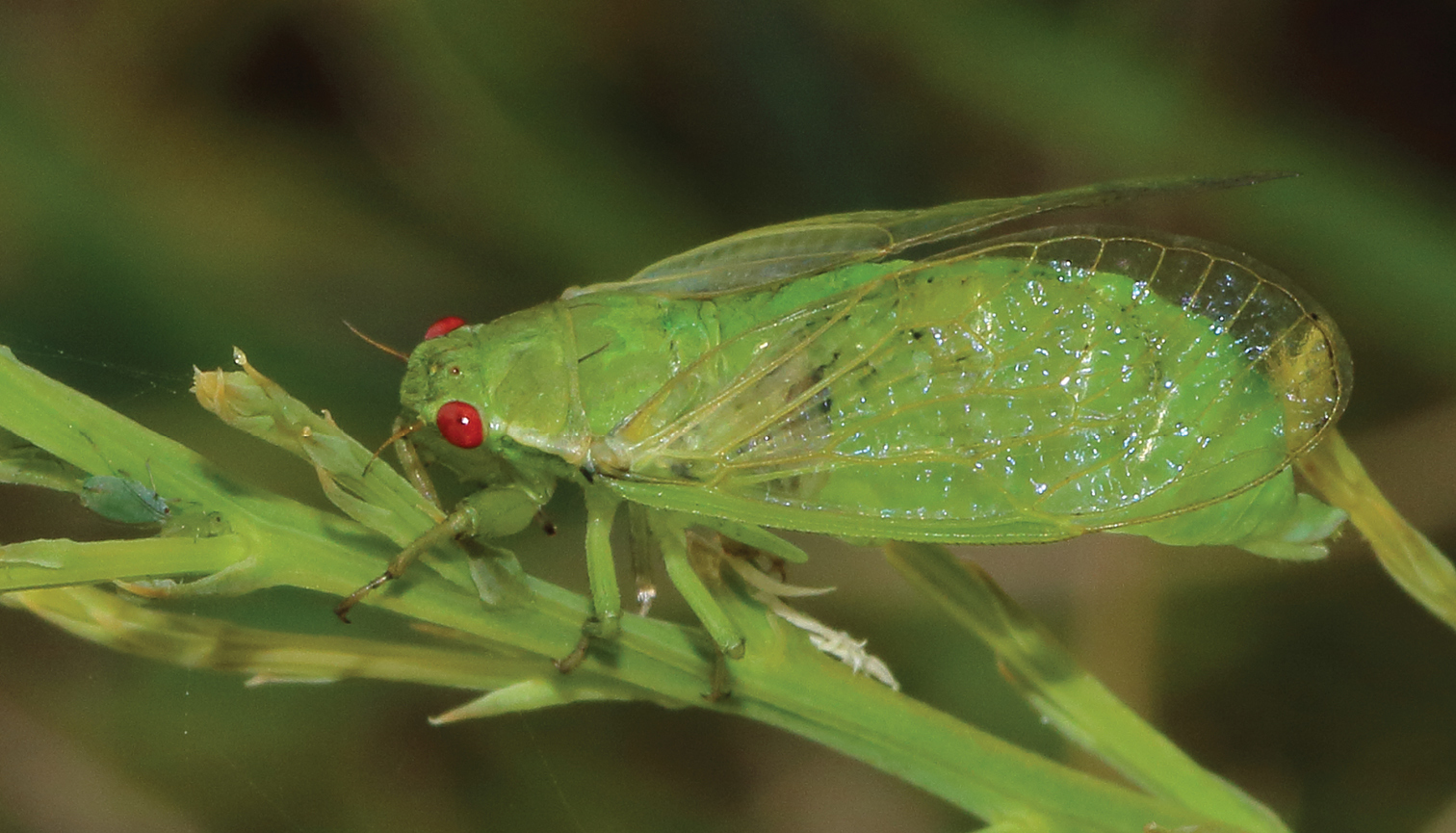
- Stagira empangeniensis

Scientific classification
- Domain: Eukaryota
- Kingdom: Animalia
- Phylum: Arthropoda
- Class: Insecta
- Order: Hemiptera
- Suborder: Auchenorrhyncha
- Family: Cicadidae
- Genus: Stagira

= Stagira (cicada) =

Genus of true bugs

Stagira is a genus of cicadas in the family Cicadidae. There are at least 30 described species in Stagira.

== Species ==
These 39 species belong to the genus Stagira:

- Stagira abagnata Villet, 1997^{c g}
- Stagira acrida (Walker, F., 1850)^{c g}
- Stagira aethlius (Walker, F., 1850)^{c g}
- Stagira caffrariensis Villet, 1997^{c g}
- Stagira celsus Villet, 1997^{c g}
- Stagira chloana Villet, 1997^{c g}
- Stagira consobrina (Distant, 1920)^{c g}
- Stagira consobrinoides Villet, 1997^{c g}
- Stagira dendrophila Villet, 1997^{c g}
- Stagira dracomontana Villet, 1997^{c g}
- Stagira dracomontanoides Villet, 1997^{c g}
- Stagira elegans Villet, 1997^{c g}
- Stagira empangeniensis Villet, 1997^{c g}
- Stagira enigmatica Villet, 1997^{c g}
- Stagira eshowiensis Villet, 1997^{c g}
- Stagira furculata Villet, 1997^{c g}
- Stagira fuscula Villet, 1997^{c g}
- Stagira microcephala (Walker, F., 1850)^{c g}
- Stagira mystica Villet, 1997^{c g}
- Stagira nasuta Villet, 1997^{c g}
- Stagira natalensis Villet, 1997^{c g}
- Stagira ngomiensis Villet, 1997^{c g}
- Stagira nkandlhaensis Villet, 1997^{c g}
- Stagira oxyclypea Villet, 1997^{c g}
- Stagira pondoensis Villet, 1997^{c g}
- Stagira pseudaethlius Villet, 1997^{c g}
- Stagira purpurea Villet, 1997^{c g}
- Stagira segmentaria Karsch, 1890^{c g}
- Stagira selindensis Villet, 1997^{c g}
- Stagira sexcostata Villet, 1997^{c g}
- Stagira simplex (Germar, 1834)^{c g}
- Stagira stygia Villet, 1997^{c g}
- Stagira sylvia Villet, 1997^{c g}
- Stagira virescens Kirkaldy, 1909^{c g}
- Stagira viridoptera Villet, 1997^{c g}
- Stagira vulgata Villet, 1997^{c g}
- Stagira xenomorpha Villet, 1997^{c g}
- Stagira zebrata Villet, 1997^{c g}
- Stagira zuluensis Villet, 1997^{c g}

Data sources: i = ITIS, c = Catalogue of Life, g = GBIF, b = Bugguide.net
