= Vagococcus silagei =

Scientific classification
- Domain: Bacteria
- Kingdom: Bacillati
- Phylum: Bacillota
- Class: Bacilli
- Order: Lactobacillales
- Family: Enterococcaceae
- Genus: Vagococcus
- Species: V. silagei

Binomial name
- Vagococcus silagei Wu et al. 2020

Type strain
- 2B-2

Bacterium

Vagococcus silagei is a Gram-positive, haemolytic, non-spore-forming, facultatively anaerobic and non-motile bacterium from the genus Vagococcus which has been isolated from Brewer's grain from Taiwan.
