= Vagococcus vulneris =

Scientific classification
- Domain: Bacteria
- Kingdom: Bacillati
- Phylum: Bacillota
- Class: Bacilli
- Order: Lactobacillales
- Family: Enterococcaceae
- Genus: Vagococcus
- Species: V. vulneris

Binomial name
- Vagococcus vulneris Shewmaker et al. 2019

Type strain
- SS1995

Bacterium

Vagococcus vulneris is a Gram-positive bacterium from the genus Vagococcus which has been isolated from a human foot wound.
