= Vagococcus humatus =

Scientific classification
- Domain: Bacteria
- Kingdom: Bacillati
- Phylum: Bacillota
- Class: Bacilli
- Order: Lactobacillales
- Family: Enterococcaceae
- Genus: Vagococcus
- Species: V. humatus

Binomial name
- Vagococcus humatus Sundararaman et al. 2017

Type strain
- C25

Bacterium

Vagococcus humatus is a Gram-positive, coccus-shaped and non-motile bacterium from the genus Vagococcus.
