= Vagococcus bubulae =

Scientific classification
- Domain: Bacteria
- Kingdom: Bacillati
- Phylum: Bacillota
- Class: Bacilli
- Order: Lactobacillales
- Family: Enterococcaceae
- Genus: Vagococcus
- Species: V. bubulae

Binomial name
- Vagococcus bubulae Shewmaker et al. 2019

Type strain
- SS1994

Bacterium

Vagococcus bubulae is a Gram-positive bacterium from the genus Vagococcus which has been isolated from ground beef.
