= Vagococcus teuberi =

Scientific classification
- Domain: Bacteria
- Kingdom: Bacillati
- Phylum: Bacillota
- Class: Bacilli
- Order: Lactobacillales
- Family: Enterococcaceae
- Genus: Vagococcus
- Species: V. teuberi

Binomial name
- Vagococcus teuberi Wullschleger et al. 2018

Type strain
- CG-21

Bacterium

Vagococcus teuberi is a bacterium from the genus Vagococcus which has been isolated from fermented soured milk from Bamako.
