= Vagococcus acidifermentans =

Scientific classification
- Domain: Bacteria
- Kingdom: Bacillati
- Phylum: Bacillota
- Class: Bacilli
- Order: Lactobacillales
- Family: Enterococcaceae
- Genus: Vagococcus
- Species: V. acidifermentans

Binomial name
- Vagococcus acidifermentans Wang et al. 2011

Species of bacterium

Vagococcus acidifermentans is a Gram-positive, coccus-shaped, non-spore-forming, facultatively species of anaerobic bacteria. The type strain is AC-1(T) (= KCTC 13418(T) = LMG 24798(T)).
