= Vagococcus lutrae =

Scientific classification
- Domain: Bacteria
- Kingdom: Bacillati
- Phylum: Bacillota
- Class: Bacilli
- Order: Lactobacillales
- Family: Enterococcaceae
- Genus: Vagococcus
- Species: V. lutrae

Binomial name
- Vagococcus lutrae Lawson et al. 1999

Type strain
- CCUG 39187

Bacterium

Vagococcus lutrae is a Gram-positive and coccus-shaped bacterium from the genus Vagococcus which has been isolated from a otter (Lutra lutra). Vagococcus lutrae can cause infection in humans in rare cases.
