= Tetragenococcus muriaticus =

Scientific classification
- Domain: Bacteria
- Kingdom: Bacillati
- Phylum: Bacillota
- Class: Bacilli
- Order: Lactobacillales
- Family: Enterococcaceae
- Genus: Tetragenococcus
- Species: T. muriaticus

Binomial name
- Tetragenococcus muriaticus Satomi et al. 1997

Species of bacterium

Tetragenococcus muriaticus is a species of moderately halophilic lactic acid, histamine-producing bacteria. X-1 (= JCM 10006) is the type strain of this species.
