= Vagococcus elongatus =

Scientific classification
- Domain: Bacteria
- Kingdom: Bacillati
- Phylum: Bacillota
- Class: Bacilli
- Order: Lactobacillales
- Family: Enterococcaceae
- Genus: Vagococcus
- Species: V. elongatus

Binomial name
- Vagococcus elongatus Lawson et al. 2007

Type strain
- PPC9

Bacterium

Vagococcus elongatus is a Gram-positive bacterium from the genus Vagococcus which has been isolated from a swine manure storage pit from the United States.
