= Vagococcus entomophilus =

Scientific classification
- Domain: Bacteria
- Kingdom: Bacillati
- Phylum: Bacillota
- Class: Bacilli
- Order: Lactobacillales
- Family: Enterococcaceae
- Genus: Vagococcus
- Species: V. entomophilus

Binomial name
- Vagococcus entomophilus Killer et al. 2014

Type strain
- VOSTP2

Bacterium

Vagococcus entomophilus is a Gram-positive, facultatively anaerobic and coccus-shaped bacterium from the genus Vagococcus which has been isolated from the digestive tract of a common wasp.
