= Vagococcus fessus =

Scientific classification
- Domain: Bacteria
- Kingdom: Bacillati
- Phylum: Bacillota
- Class: Bacilli
- Order: Lactobacillales
- Family: Enterococcaceae
- Genus: Vagococcus
- Species: V. fessus

Binomial name
- Vagococcus fessus Hoyles et al. 2000

Type strain
- CCUG 41755

Bacterium

Vagococcus fessus is a Gram-positive, facultatively anaerobic and coccus-shaped bacterium from the genus Vagococcus which has been isolated from a dead seal and a dead harbour porpoise.
