= Vagococcus coleopterorum =

Scientific classification
- Domain: Bacteria
- Kingdom: Bacillati
- Phylum: Bacillota
- Class: Bacilli
- Order: Lactobacillales
- Family: Enterococcaceae
- Genus: Vagococcus
- Species: V. coleopterorum

Binomial name
- Vagococcus coleopterorum Hyun et al. 2020

Type strain
- HDW17A

Bacterium

Vagococcus coleopterorum is a Gram-positive and facultative anaerobic bacterium from the genus Vagococcus which has been isolated from the intestine of the diving beetle Cybister lewisianus.
