= Vagococcus carniphilus =

Scientific classification
- Domain: Bacteria
- Kingdom: Bacillati
- Phylum: Bacillota
- Class: Bacilli
- Order: Lactobacillales
- Family: Enterococcaceae
- Genus: Vagococcus
- Species: V. carniphilus

Binomial name
- Vagococcus carniphilus Shewmaker et al. 2004

Species of bacterium

Vagococcus carniphilus is a Gram-positive, non-spore-forming species of bacteria. The type strain of V. carniphilus is 1843-02^{T} (=ATCC BAA-640^{T} =CCUG 46823^{T}).
