= Vagococcus salmoninarum =

Scientific classification
- Domain: Bacteria
- Kingdom: Bacillati
- Phylum: Bacillota
- Class: Bacilli
- Order: Lactobacillales
- Family: Enterococcaceae
- Genus: Vagococcus
- Species: V. salmoninarum

Binomial name
- Vagococcus salmoninarum Wallbanks et al. 1990

Species of bacterium

Vagococcus salmoninarum is a species of bacteria, with type strain NCFB 2777. It is pathogenic towards Oncorhynchus mykiss.
