= Tetragenococcus halophilus =

Scientific classification
- Domain: Bacteria
- Kingdom: Bacillati
- Phylum: Bacillota
- Class: Bacilli
- Order: Lactobacillales
- Family: Enterococcaceae
- Genus: Tetragenococcus
- Species: T. halophilus

Binomial name
- Tetragenococcus halophilus (Mees 1934) Collins et al. 1993

Synonyms
- Pediococcus halophilus Mees 1934

Species of bacterium

Tetragenococcus halophilus is a halophilic lactic acid bacterium active in the fermentation processes of soy sauce, miso, fish sauce and salted anchovies. This species is Gram-positive.
