= Vagococcus zengguangii =

Scientific classification
- Domain: Bacteria
- Kingdom: Bacillati
- Phylum: Bacillota
- Class: Bacilli
- Order: Lactobacillales
- Family: Enterococcaceae
- Genus: Vagococcus
- Species: V. zengguangii

Binomial name
- Vagococcus zengguangii Ge et al. 2021

Type strain
- MN-17

Bacterium

Vagococcus zengguangii is a Gram-positive bacterium from the genus of Vagococcus which has been isolated from the faeces of a yak from the Tibetan Plateau.
