= Vagococcus hydrophili =

Scientific classification
- Domain: Bacteria
- Kingdom: Bacillati
- Phylum: Bacillota
- Class: Bacilli
- Order: Lactobacillales
- Family: Enterococcaceae
- Genus: Vagococcus
- Species: V. hydrophili

Binomial name
- Vagococcus hydrophili Hyun et al. 2020

Type strain
- HDW17B

Bacterium

Vagococcus hydrophili is a Gram-positive, coccus-shaped and facultative anaerobic bacterium from the genus Vagococcus which has been isolated from the intestine of the diving beetle Hydrophilus acuminatus.
