= Vagococcus xieshaowenii =

Scientific classification
- Domain: Bacteria
- Kingdom: Bacillati
- Phylum: Bacillota
- Class: Bacilli
- Order: Lactobacillales
- Family: Enterococcaceae
- Genus: Vagococcus
- Species: V. xieshaowenii

Binomial name
- Vagococcus xieshaowenii Ge et al. 2020

Type strain
- CF-49

Bacterium

Vagococcus xieshaowenii is a Gram-positive, coccus-shaped and non-motile bacterium from the genus Vagococcus which has been isolated from the cloacal of a White-rumped snowfinch from the Tibetan Plateau.
