= Vagococcus fluvialis =

Scientific classification
- Domain: Bacteria
- Kingdom: Bacillati
- Phylum: Bacillota
- Class: Bacilli
- Order: Lactobacillales
- Family: Enterococcaceae
- Genus: Vagococcus
- Species: V. fluvialis

Binomial name
- Vagococcus fluvialis Collins et al. 1990

Species of bacterium

Vagococcus fluvialis is a species of bacteria. The type strain of V. fluvialis is NCDO 2497. It rarely causes human infection. The only genetically proven case of V. fluvialis endocarditis was detected in the Cochin, India.
