= Vagococcus martis =

Scientific classification
- Domain: Bacteria
- Kingdom: Bacillati
- Phylum: Bacillota
- Class: Bacilli
- Order: Lactobacillales
- Family: Enterococcaceae
- Genus: Vagococcus
- Species: V. martis

Binomial name
- Vagococcus martis Tak et al. 2017

Type strain
- D7T301

Bacterium

Vagococcus martis is a Gram-positive, coccus-shaped facultative aerobic and non-motile bacterium from the genus Vagococcus which has been isolated from the small intestine of a Yellow-throated marten.
