= Vagococcus penaei =

Scientific classification
- Domain: Bacteria
- Kingdom: Bacillati
- Phylum: Bacillota
- Class: Bacilli
- Order: Lactobacillales
- Family: Enterococcaceae
- Genus: Vagococcus
- Species: V. penaei

Binomial name
- Vagococcus penaei Jaffrès et al. 2009

Species of bacterium

Vagococcus penaei is a species of bacteria. It is Gram-positive, catalase-negative and coccus-shaped. Its type strain is CD276^{T} (=LMG 24833^{T} =CIP 109914^{T}).
