= Vagococcus intermedius =

Scientific classification
- Domain: Bacteria
- Kingdom: Bacillati
- Phylum: Bacillota
- Class: Bacilli
- Order: Lactobacillales
- Family: Enterococcaceae
- Genus: Vagococcus
- Species: V. intermedius

Binomial name
- Vagococcus intermedius Johansson et al. 2023

Type strain
- STAA11

Bacterium

Vagococcus intermedius is a Gram-positive bacterium from the genus Vagococcus which has been isolated from broiler meat.
