= Melissococcus =

Scientific classification
- Domain: Bacteria
- Kingdom: Bacillati
- Phylum: Bacillota
- Class: Bacilli
- Order: Lactobacillales
- Family: Enterococcaceae
- Genus: Melissococcus (ex White, 1912); Bailey and Collins, 1983

Species
- Melissococcus plutonius

Genus of bacteria

Melissococcus is a genus of Gram-positive, catalase-negative, coccus-shaped lactic acid bacteria within the family Enterococcaceae. Melissococcus species were classified as Streptococcus until 1983 when Melissococcus was recognized as a distinct genus. Notable species include M. plutonius, which is a cause of European foulbrood (an infectious disease that primarily affects honeybees).
