= Association Francophone pour l'Etude et la Recherche sur les Hikikomori =

Mental health association in Italy

AFHIKI
- French Association for the Study and Research on Hikikomori
- Association Francophone pour l'Etude et la Recherche sur les Hikikomori
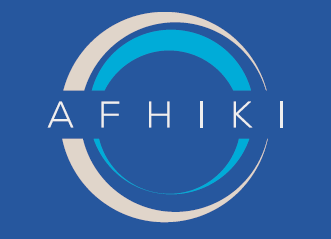
- Logo of AFHIKI as shown on their official website
- Formation: December 10, 2020; 5 years ago
- Founder: Marie-Jeanne Guedj
- Legal status: Association
- Headquarters: Paris, France
- Region served: France
- Fields: Mental health

The Association Francophone pour l'Etude et la Recherche sur les Hikikomori (Abbreviation: AFHIKI, English: French Association for the Study and Research on Hikikomori) is a French nonprofit organization dedicated to the clinical study, scientific research, and professional coordination surrounding the hikikomori phenomenon. It was founded on December 10, 2020, in Paris by psychiatrist and child psychiatrist Dr. Marie-Jeanne Guedj, working across France. AFHIKI works to improve the understanding and institutional management of social reclusion through professional medical seminars, public awareness campaigns, and specialized training programs. In addition to fostering epidemiological research, the organization advises public health authorities on optimizing healthcare coverage and directly supports affected families by managing psychoeducational workshops and regional care directories.

== History ==
The founder, psychiatrist Dr. Marie-Jeanne Guedj-Bourdiau, followed the hikikomori phenomenon in France since 2008, and treated individuals with a video games addiction since 2005.

On 10 December 2020, AFHIKI was officially founded and registered with the French government, classified as a professional organization. Since 2022, AFHIKI has organized and participated in scientific meetings, public lectures, conferences, and symposia on hikikomori, social withdrawal, school refusal, adolescent mental health, and related psychiatric issues.

== Services ==
=== Assistance to hikikomori ===
When a hikikomori starts to leave their room they may be able to access therapy depending on their specific case, including psychiatry. Treatment also combines home visits, youth support groups, and sometimes hospitalization. Patients may also be given antidepressants.

=== Assistance to parents ===
The organization assist the parents or the family of hikikomoris through "parental guidance" as a first step of their approach, drawing partial methodology from the "japanese" method. This is done by teaching parents not to pressure their children and instead making them a diplomatic actor as to make the hikikomori in question understand that they have a support network outside of their room and make them rediscover the "joys" that lay beyond the room they've confined themselves in.

== Research ==
The hikikomori phenomenon in France is understood by AFHIKI as a new form of regurgitation against modern societies. It is a specific clinical and behavioral manifestation that can be identified after six months of isolation. The phenomenon also presents itself following dropping out of school or becoming unemployed, or abuse and harassment.

The association states that the majority of french hikikomori are between the age of 15 to 30, and that they mostly come from privileged backgrounds. Mental illness is not predominantly present, however in some cases schizophrenia and narcissism were identified in certain patients.

Whilst an exact estimate of how many hikikomori exist in France is still not present, the association stated that NEETs, which have been noted by the founders as being the starter point for a person to later become a hikikomori, number at least 400.000.

Prolonged hikikomori syndrome, according to the association, may also lead to the development of posture problems, thinness, obesity and also dental problems for the hikikomori themselves and the development of mental distress and mental health issues for the other family members within the house.
