= Catellicoccus =

Scientific classification
- Domain: Bacteria
- Kingdom: Bacillati
- Phylum: Bacillota
- Class: Bacilli
- Order: Lactobacillales
- Family: Enterococcaceae
- Genus: Catellicoccus; Lawson et al. 2006
- Species: C. marimammalium

Binomial name
- Catellicoccus marimammalium Lawson et al. 2006

Genus of bacteria

Catellicoccus is a monotypic genus of bacteria of the phylum Bacillota. The genus is related to other catalase-negative genera such as Enterococcus.
