= Tetragenococcus =

Scientific classification
- Domain: Bacteria
- Kingdom: Bacillati
- Phylum: Bacillota
- Class: Bacilli
- Order: Lactobacillales
- Family: Enterococcaceae
- Genus: Tetragenococcus; Collins et al. 1993

Type species
- Tetragenococcus halophilus (Mees 1934) Collins et al. 1993

Species
- Tetragenococcus halophilus Tetragenococcus koreensis Tetragenococcus muriaticus Tetragenococcus osmophilus Tetragenococcus solitarius

Genus of bacteria

Tetragenococcus is a gram-positive, facultatively aerobic, moderately halophilic and nonmotile bacterial genus from the family Enterococcaceae.
