= Hozon =

Hozon (保存) and bonji are trademarked seasonings developed by David Chang and marketed by Momofuku. They are made from fermented nuts, grains, or seeds. The name "Hozon" comes from the Japanese word meaning "to preserve".

== Production ==
Hozon is made by fermenting koji fungus and salt on a substrate such as cashews, chickpeas, or lentils. Koji acts as the catalyst for fermentation and is added to the other ingredients in a controlled environment to age. During this time, microbial and enzymatic processes occur causing flavors to develop. Following fermentation, the liquids are separated and used to make bonji, a savory liquid seasoning with a flavor similar to a low-salt soy sauce. This process is derived from the Japanese technique for making miso and tamari, replacing soy with nontraditional ingredients.

=== Usage ===
When fermentation is complete, the resulting mixture can be used as is, or pureed to a smoother consistency. Hozon can be used as a butter substitute, curry, or soup base. Hozon originated and has been produced in the Momofuku Culinary Lab, and since 2012, it has been used by Chef Corey Lee at Benu in San Francisco and by Jamie Bissonnette of Toro.
