= Lacto-3 RNA motif =

The Lacto-3 RNA motif is a conserved RNA structure that was discovered by bioinformatics. Lacto-3 motif RNAs are found in a wide variety of organisms classified under Lactobacillales. Lacto-3 RNAs likely function in trans as small RNAs, and no organism is predicted to contain more than one Lacto-3 RNA.
