= Pilibacter =

Scientific classification
- Domain: Bacteria
- Kingdom: Bacillati
- Phylum: Bacillota
- Class: Bacilli
- Order: Lactobacillales
- Family: Enterococcaceae
- Genus: Pilibacter; Higashiguchi et al. 2006
- Species: P. termitis

Binomial name
- Pilibacter termitis Higashiguchi et al. 2006

Monotypic genus of bacteria

Pilibacter is a genus of bacteria of the Enterococcaceae. This genus contains a single species, Pilibacter termitis, strains of which were isolated from a termite (Coptotermes formosanus Shiraki).

Bacteria in this genus have been found in the respiratory tracts of human patients with pulmonary tuberculosis.
