= Lacto-2 RNA motif =

The lacto-2 RNA motif is an RNA structure that is conserved amongst bacteria within the order Lactobacillales. The motif consists of a stem-loop whose stem is interrupted by many internal loops and bulges. Nucleotide identities in many places are conserved, and one internal loop in particular is highly conserved.

As lacto-2 RNAs are not consistently located in 5′ UTRs, they are presumed to correspond to non-coding RNAs. However, most (80%) of the RNAs are in a position that may correspond to the 5′ UTR, so it is not inconceivable that the RNA has a role as a cis-regulatory element. Many lacto-2 RNAs are present in operons that encode tRNAs and rRNAs, and many are adjacent to genes encoding protein subunits of the ribosome, although they are not necessarily in the same operon as these protein-coding genes. Lacto-2 RNAs also have a weak association with genes involved in nucleotide biosynthesis and transport, including several independent genes within the de-novo purine biosynthesis pathway and some in pyrimidine biosynthesis.
