= Tooth pathology =

- Other names: Tooth diseases, tooth disorders, dental pathology
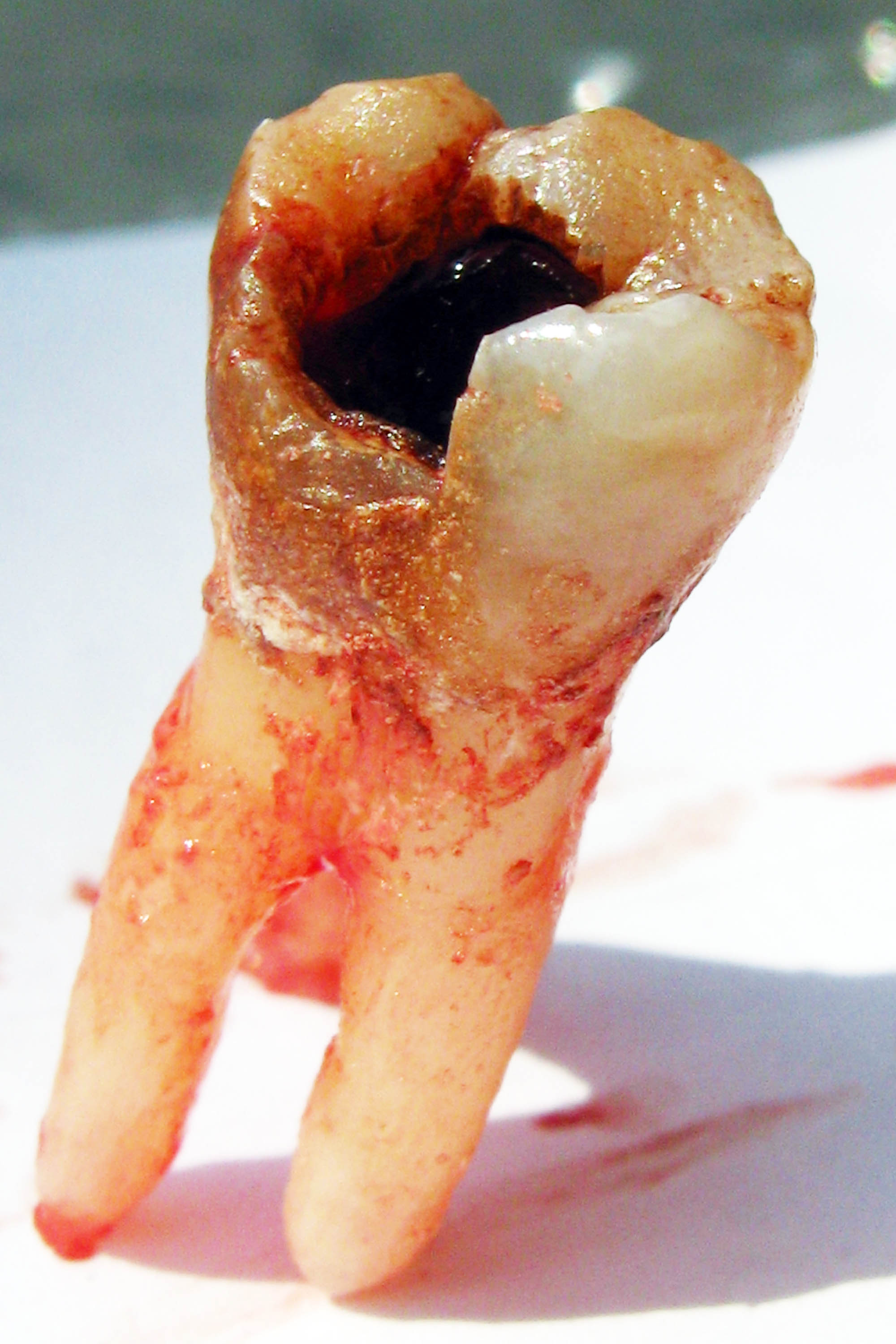
- Cavity
- Specialty: Dentistry

Tooth pathology is any condition of the teeth that can be congenital or acquired. Sometimes a congenital tooth disease is called a tooth abnormality. These are among the most common diseases in humans The prevention, diagnosis, treatment and rehabilitation of these diseases are the base to the dentistry profession, in which are dentists and dental hygienists, and its sub-specialties, such as oral medicine, oral and maxillofacial surgery, and endodontics. Tooth pathology is usually separated from other types of dental issues, including enamel hypoplasia and tooth wear.

== Examples ==
=== Congenital ===
- Anodontia

=== Acquired ===
- Dental caries—Dental caries are known as cavities or tooth decay. Bacteria in the mouth use foods that contain sugar or starch to produce acids which eat away at the tooth’s structure causing destruction to the enamel of the teeth. Meanwhile, the minerals in saliva (calcium and phosphate) together with fluoride are repairing the enamel. Dental caries is a chronic disease that can be prevented and show strongly in 6- to 11-year-old children and 12- to 19-year-old adolescents. 9 out of 10 adults are affected with some type of tooth decay. Prevention includes good oral hygiene that consists of brushing twice daily, flossing, eating nutritious meals and limiting snacking, and visiting the dentist on a regular basis. Fluoride treatments benefit the teeth by strengthening while sealants help chewing surfaces to not decay. Severe cases can lead to tooth extraction and dentures.
- Dental abscess—A dental abscess is a collection of pus that accumulates in teeth or gums as a result of bacterial infection, giving rise to a severe throbbing pain at the site of the abscess. It is caused by consuming sugary or starchy food and poor dental hygiene and is treated by a dentist by draining the pus and, possibly, removing the infected tooth/teeth altogether.
- Periodontal diseases. Periodontal disease refers to infections of the gums and supporting structures of the teeth. Gingivitis, an early stage of periodontal disease, is characterized by inflamed and bleeding gums. If left untreated, the disease can progress to periodontitis, leading to gum recession, bone loss, and eventually tooth loss. Poor oral hygiene, tobacco use, genetic factors and certain systemic conditions increase the risk of periodontal disease. Treatment includes professional deep cleaning (scaling and root planning), antibiotics, and in advanced cases, surgery may be required.
- Pulpitis. Pulpitis is an inflammation of the pulp, or the core of the tooth, where the blood vessels and nerves are located. One of the main signs of its appearance is sharp pain that intensifies with high or low temperature. In most cases, pulpitis occurs as a result of neglected caries, and if untreated, it turns into periodontitis. In the initial stage, pulp inflammation is treated quite simply. The tooth nerve and pulp are not removed and the inflammation is relieved with therapeutic agents. In cases where a live nerve cannot be extracted, it is treated with a special paste containing arsenic or paraformaldehyde. 1-2 days after treatment, the pulp dies and is painlessly extracted.

== See also ==
- Oral medicine
- Oral and maxillofacial pathology
- Tongue disease
