= Marukome =

Japanese miso soup paste producer

Marukome Co., Ltd.

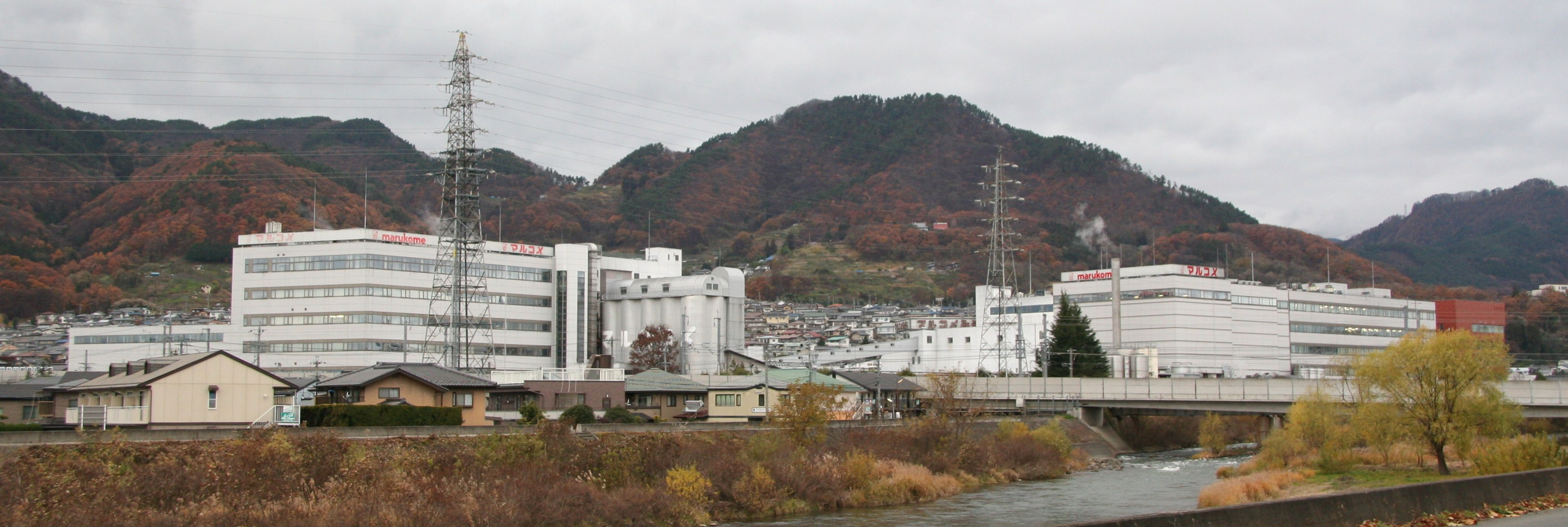
- Marukome headquarters and factory in Nagano
- Native name: マルコメ株式会社
- Company type: Private KK
- Industry: Food
- Founded: 1854; 172 years ago
- Headquarters: Nagano, Japan
- Area served: Worldwide
- Key people: Atsuki Aoki (President)
- Products: Miso paste; Instant miso soup; Seasonings
- Revenue: JPY 43.9 billion (FY 2016) (US$ 390 million) (FY 2016)
- Number of employees: 436 (as of March 31, 2017)
- Website: Official website

Marukome Co., Ltd. (マルコメ株式会社, Marukome Kabushiki-gaisha) is the name of a Japanese miso soup paste producer. Its headquarters are located in the city of Nagano. Marukome accounts for about 13% of the amount of miso produced in Japan each year which makes them one of the top in production volume among 2,500 miso producers in Japan.

On December 5, 2007, Marukome USA, Inc. opened its United States headquarters and factory in Irvine, California.

As a commercial gimmick, Marukome has organized contests for kids to become "Marukome Boy" (マルコメくん) who subsequently represents the company in advertisement. To be a winner, the Marukome Boy should look similar to the company logo of a small boy with a bald head.

== Marketing ==
In 2017 Marukome launched two types of organic miso powder in a collaboration with Australian model Miranda Kerr, with the model providing her personal input into the creation of the new products.
