= Vagococcus =

Scientific classification
- Domain: Bacteria
- Kingdom: Bacillati
- Phylum: Bacillota
- Class: Bacilli
- Order: Lactobacillales
- Family: Enterococcaceae
- Genus: Vagococcus; Collins, et al. 1989

Type species
- Vagococcus fluvialis Collins et al. 1990

Species
- See text

Genus of bacteria

Vagococcus is a genus of gram-positive bacteria. They are motile or nonmotile cocci which do not form spores. The name Vagococcus comes from Latin adjective vagus meaning wandering; and the Greek noun coccus a grain or berry, Vagococcus - wandering coccus, because Vagococcus fluvialis and some other Vagococcus species are motile, an unusual property for a lactic acid bacteria.

== History ==
The first Vagococcus species, Vagococcus fluvialis, was isolated from chicken feces in 1974. However, the genus was not recognized as distinct until 1989.

== Phylogeny ==
The currently accepted taxonomy is based on the List of Prokaryotic names with Standing in Nomenclature (LPSN) and National Center for Biotechnology Information (NCBI).

16S rRNA based LTP_10_2024

- Vagococcus
  - - V. intermedius
    - - V. coleopterorum
      - - V. fessus
        - V. proximus
  - - - V. entomophilus
      - - V. allomyrinae
        - V. salmoninarum
    - - V. xieshaowenii
      - - - V. humatus
          - - V. lutrae
            - - V. acidifermentans
              - V. elongatus
        - - - V. fluvialis
            - - V. carniphilus
              - V. hydrophili
          - - V. silagei
            - - V. bubulae
              - - - V. martis
                  - V. teuberi
                - - V. luciliae
                  - - V. penaei
                    - V. vulneris

120 marker proteins based GTDB 09-RS220

- Vagococcus
  - V. entomophilus Killer et al. 2014
  - - - - V. humatus Sundararaman, Srinivasan & Lee 2017
        - - V. lutrae Lawson et al. 1999
          - - V. elongatus Lawson et al. 2007
            - - V. xieshaowenii Ge et al. 2020
              - "V. zengguangii" Ge et al. 2021
      - - - V. allomyrinae Kim et al. 2022
          - V. salmoninarum Wallbanks et al. 1990
        - - V. intermedius Johansson et al. 2023
          - - V. coleopterorum Hyun et al. 2022
            - - V. fessus Hoyles et al. 2000
              - V. proximus Johansson et al. 2023
    - - V. acidifermentans Wang et al. 2011
      - - - V. silagei Wu et al. 2020
          - - V. penaei Jaffrès et al. 2010
            - V. vulneris Shewmaker et al. 2019
        - - - - V. fluvialis Collins et al. 1990
              - "Ca. V. giribetii" Schwartzman et al. 2023
            - - V. carniphilus Shewmaker et al. 2004
              - V. hydrophili Hyun et al. 2022
          - - - V. bubulae Shewmaker et al. 2019
              - V. luciliae Guzman et al. 2023
            - - V. martis Tak et al. 2017
              - V. teuberi Wullschleger et al. 2018

Unassigned species:

- V. jeotgali Joe et al. 2024

== See also ==
- List of Bacteria genera
- List of bacterial orders
