= Lacto-phage-1 RNA motif =

Lacto-phage-1
- Consensus secondary structure and sequence conservation of Lacto-phage-1 RNA

Identifiers
- Symbol: Lacto-phage-1
- Rfam: RF03004

Other data
- RNA type: Gene; sRNA
- SO: SO:0001263
- PDB structures: PDBe

The Lacto-phage-1 RNA motif is a conserved RNA structure that was discovered by bioinformatics. Lacto-phage-1 motif RNAs are found in Lactobacillales.

It is ambiguous whether Lacto-phage-1 RNAs function as cis-regulatory elements or whether they operate in trans, as there are not enough examples to draw a conclusion. Many Lacto-phage-1 RNAs are associated with the phage gene arpU, and presumably are present in prophages.
