= Miso =

Traditional Japanese seasoning

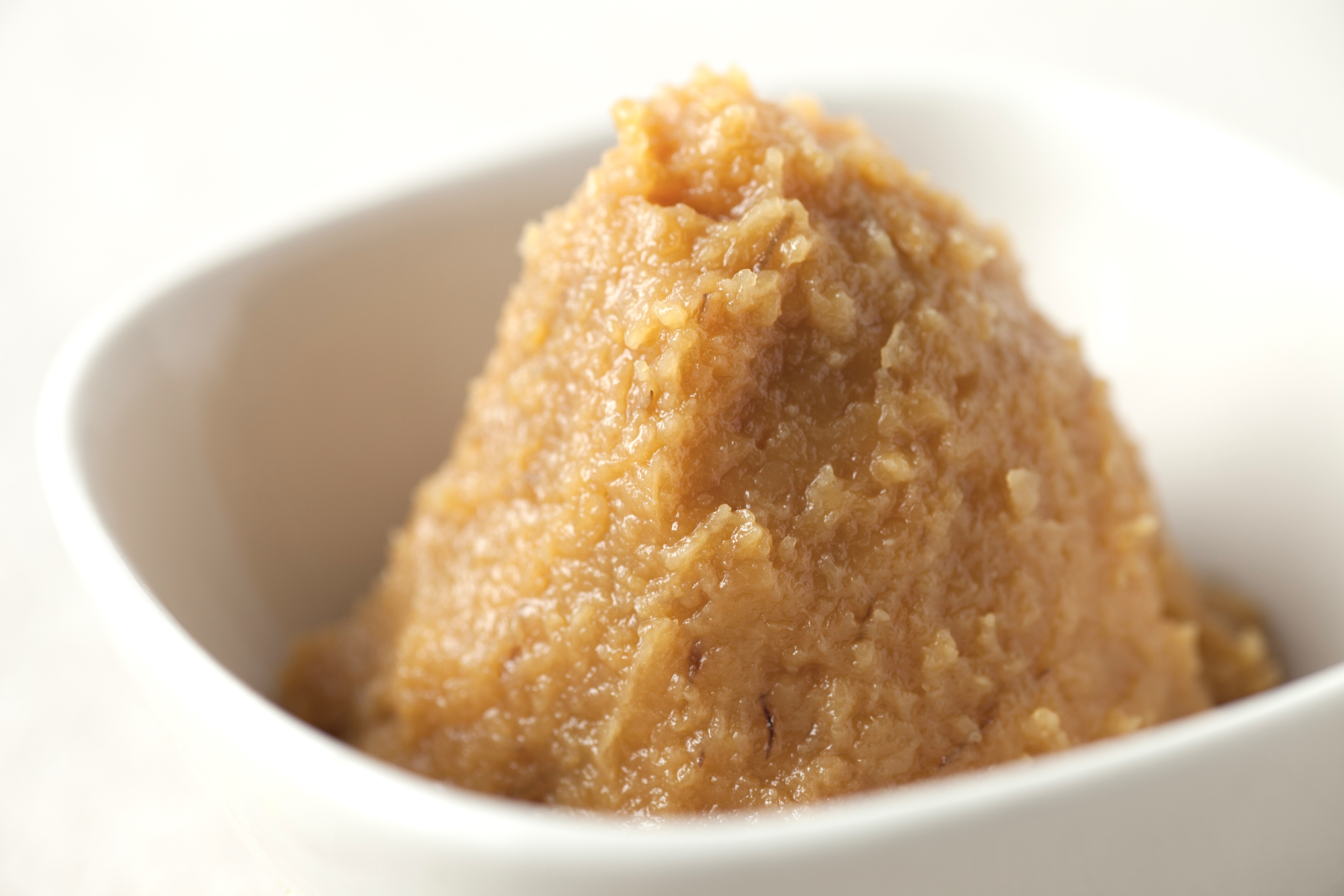
- Miso
- Alternative names: Soybean paste, 味噌 (Japanese)
- Type: Seasoning
- Place of origin: Japan
- Associated cuisine: Japanese
- Main ingredients: Fermented soybeans, salt, kōji (Aspergillus oryzae)

Miso (みそ or 味噌) is a traditional Japanese seasoning. It is a thick paste produced by fermenting soybeans with salt and kōji (the fungus Aspergillus oryzae), and sometimes rice, barley, seaweed, or other ingredients. It is used for sauces and spreads; pickling vegetables, fish, or meats; and mixing with dashi soup stock to serve as miso soup, a Japanese culinary staple food. Miso is high in protein and rich in minerals, and it played an important nutritional role in feudal Japan. Miso is widely used in both traditional and modern cooking in Japan, and as of 2018 had been gaining worldwide interest.

Typically, miso is salty, but its flavor and aroma depend on the ingredients and fermentation process. Different varieties of miso have been variously described as salty, sweet, earthy, fruity, or savory.

== History ==
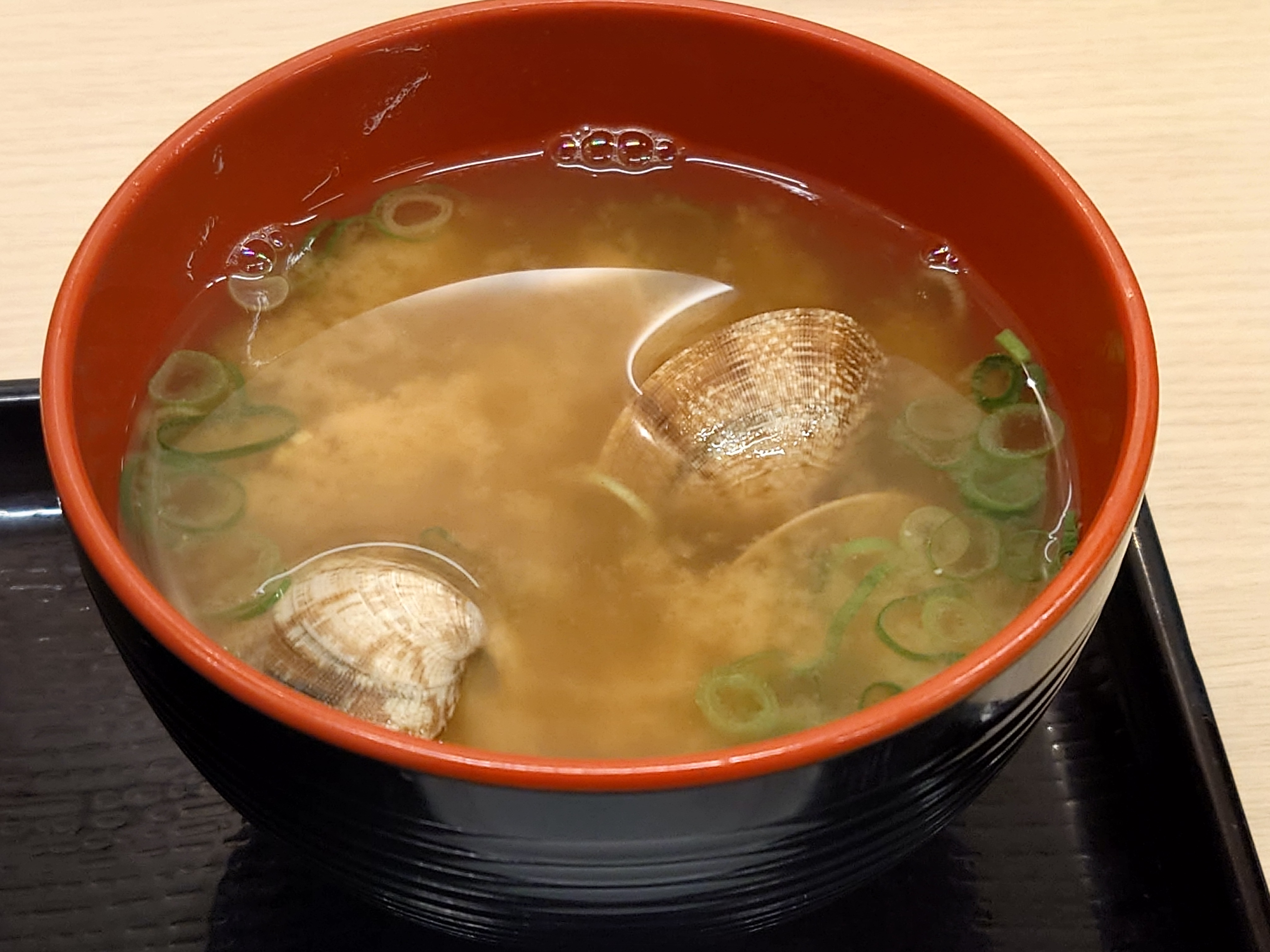
Miso soup with clams

The origin of miso in Japan is not completely clear.

- Grain and fish misos had been manufactured in Japan since the Neolithic era (Jōmon period, 14,000–300 BC). These are called jōmon miso and are similar to the early fish- and soy-based sauces produced throughout East Asia.
- This miso predecessor originated in China during the third century BC. Hishio (醤) and other fermented soy-based foods likely were introduced to Japan at the same time as Buddhism in the sixth century AD. This fermented food was called shi (Chinese: 豉; pinyin: Shì). The beginning of the current origin of miso is mishō or mishou (未醤) in the Nara period (710–794); with hishio still meaning beans. It is believed that the word changed to Misho and then Miso.

In the Kamakura period (1185–1333), a common meal was made up of a bowl of rice, some dried fish, a serving of miso, and a fresh vegetable. Until the Muromachi period (1337 to 1573), miso was made without grinding the soybeans, somewhat like nattō. In the Muromachi era, Buddhist monks discovered that soybeans could be ground into a paste, spawning new methods using miso to flavor other foods. In medieval times, the word temaemiso, meaning homemade miso, appeared. Miso production is relatively simple, so homemade versions spread throughout Japan. Miso was used as military provisions during the Sengoku period, and making miso was an important economic activity for daimyōs of that era.

During the Edo period (1603–1868), miso was also called hishio (醤) and kuki (豆支) and various types of miso that fit with each local climate and culture emerged throughout Japan.

Today, miso is produced industrially in large quantities, and traditional homemade miso has become a rarity. In recent years, many new types of miso have appeared, including ones with added soup stocks or calcium, made with beans other than soy, or having reduced salt for health, among other varieties available.

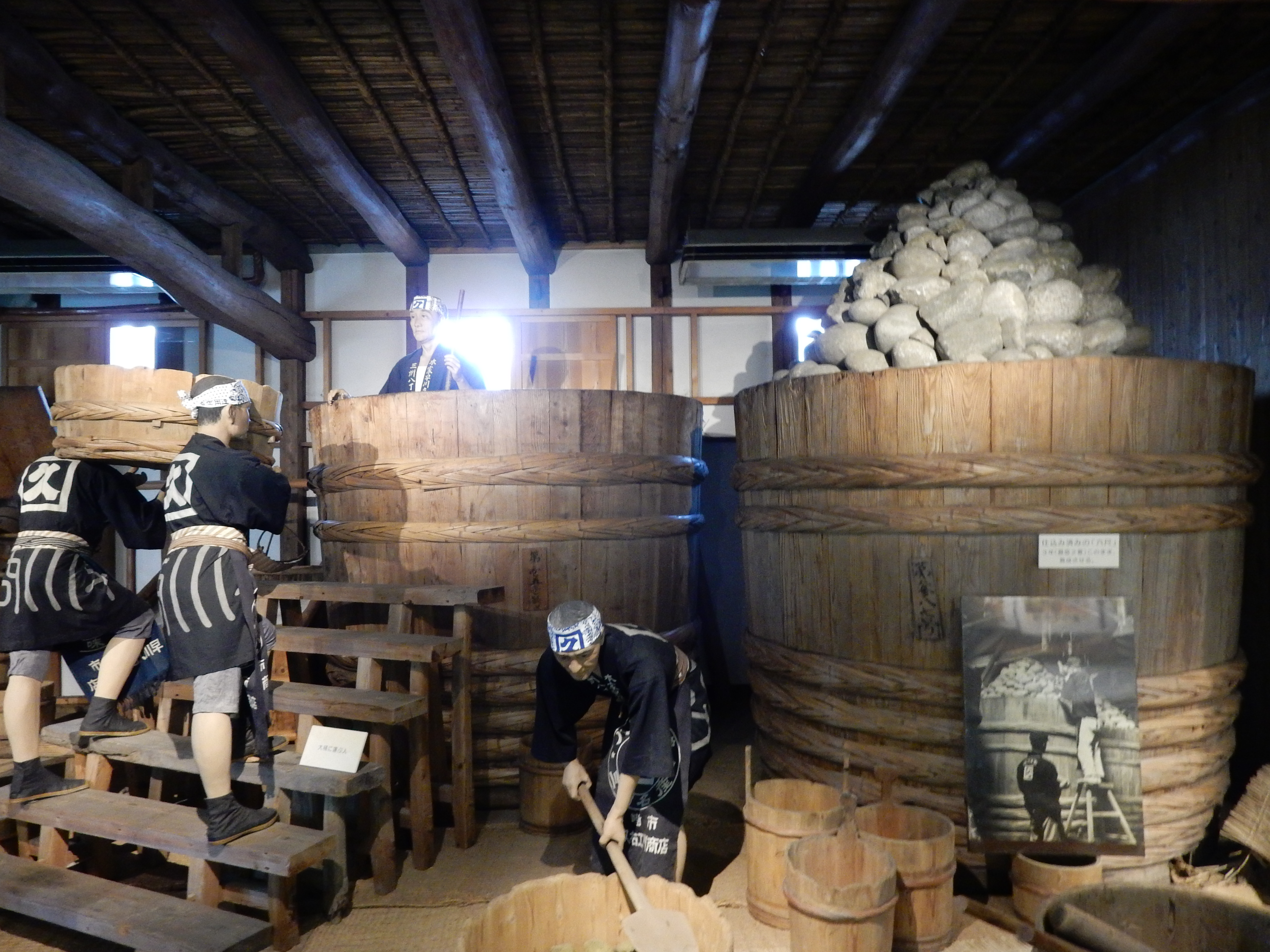
Recreation of miso fermentation process

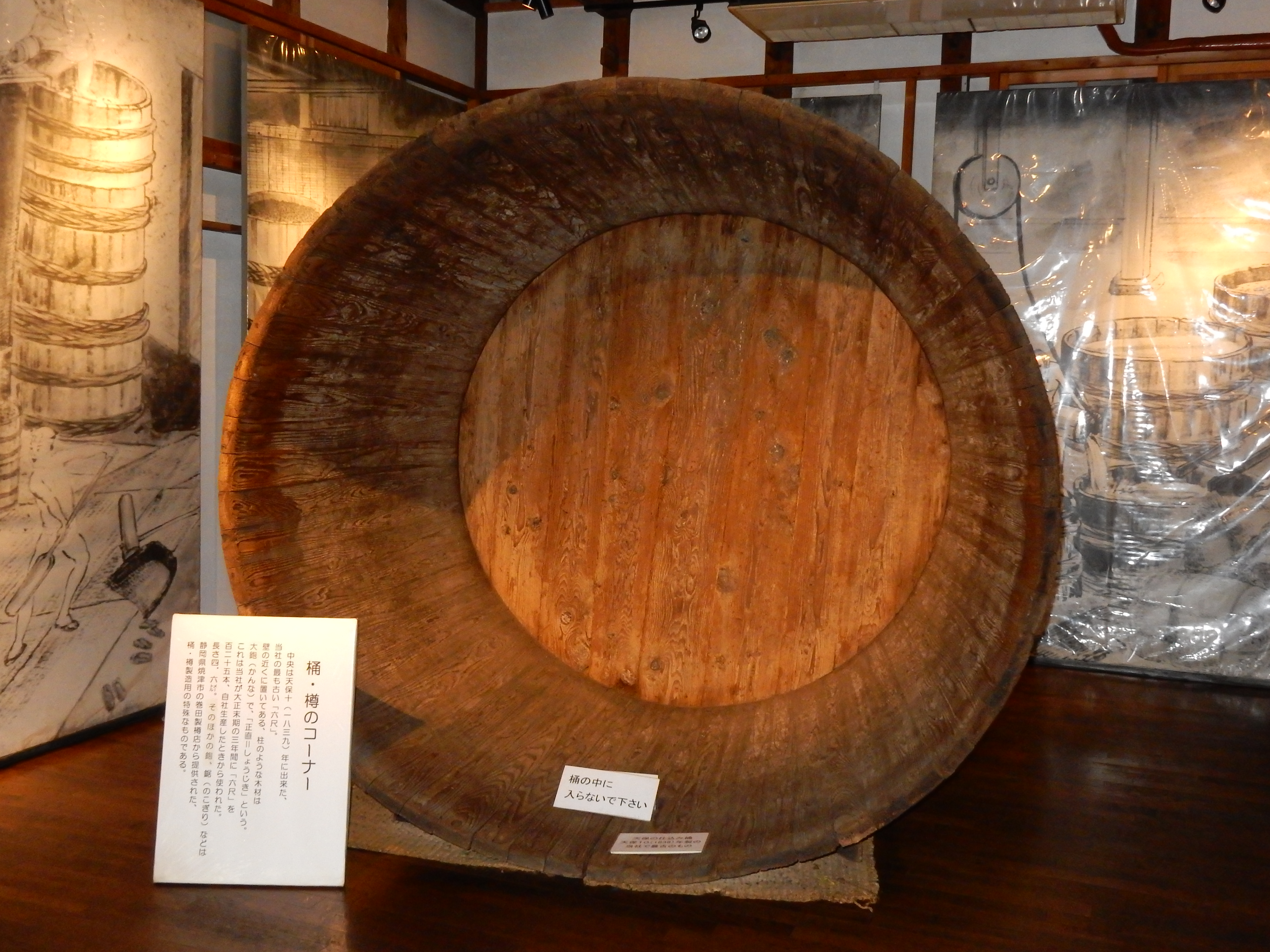
Six shaku fermentation barrel, 1839

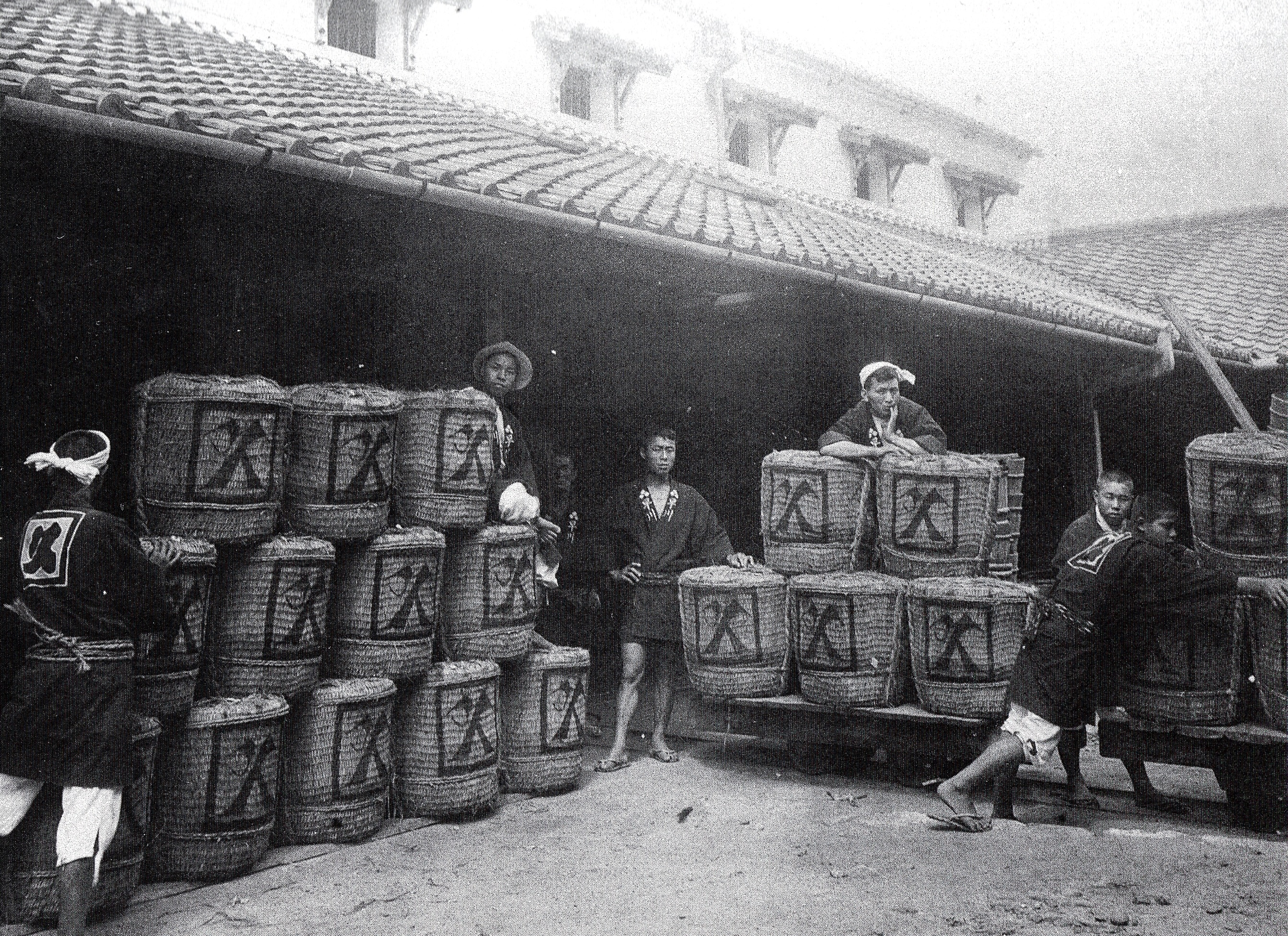
Miso packed for transport. Meiji period, 1910

== Ingredients ==
Miso
Nutritional value per 100 g (3.5 oz)
- Energy: 831 kJ (199 kcal)
- Carbohydrates: 26.47
- Sugars: 6.2
- Dietary fiber: 5.4
- Fat: 6.01
- Saturated: 1.139
- Monounsaturated: 1.242
- Polyunsaturated: 3.204
- Protein: 11.69
Amino acids
Tryptophan	0.155 g
Threonine	0.479 g
Isoleucine	0.508 g
Leucine	0.82 g
Lysine	0.478 g
Methionine	0.129 g
Cystine	0 g
Phenylalanine	0.486 g
Tyrosine	0.352 g
Valine	0.547 g
Arginine	0.784 g
Histidine	0.243 g
Alanine	0.5 g
Aspartic acid	1.171 g
Glutamic acid	1.915 g
Glycine	0.447 g
Proline	0.619 g
Serine	0.601 g
Vitamins and minerals
Vitamins	Quantity %DV^{†}
Vitamin A equiv. beta-Carotene lutein zeaxanthin	0% 4 μg 0% 52 μg 0 μg
Thiamine (B1)	8% 0.098 mg
Riboflavin (B2)	18% 0.233 mg
Niacin (B3)	6% 0.906 mg
Pantothenic acid (B5)	7% 0.337 mg
Vitamin B6	12% 0.199 mg
Folate (B9)	5% 19 μg
Vitamin B12	3% 0.08 μg
Choline	13% 72.2 mg
Vitamin C	0% 0 mg
Vitamin D	0% 0 IU
Vitamin E	0% 0.01 mg
Vitamin K	24% 29.3 μg
Minerals	Quantity %DV^{†}
Calcium	4% 57 mg
Iron	14% 2.49 mg
Magnesium	11% 48 mg
Manganese	37% 0.859 mg
Phosphorus	13% 159 mg
Potassium	7% 210 mg
Selenium	13% 7 μg
Sodium	162% 3728 mg
Zinc	23% 2.56 mg
- Other constituents: Quantity
- Water: 50
- Alcohol (ethanol): 0
- ^{†}Percentages estimated using US recommendations for adults, except for potassium, which is estimated based on expert recommendation from the National Academies.

The ingredients used to produce miso may include any mix of soybeans, barley, rice, buckwheat, millet, rye, wheat, hemp seed, and cycad, among others. Lately, producers in other countries have also begun selling miso made from chickpeas, corn, azuki beans, amaranth, and quinoa. Fermentation time ranges from as little as five days to several years. The variety of Japanese miso is difficult to classify but is commonly done by grain type, color, taste, and background.

- mugi (麦): barley
- tsubu (粒): whole wheat/barley
- genmai (玄米): brown rice
- moromi (醪): chunky, healthy (kōji is unblended)
- nanban (南蛮): mixed with hot chili pepper for dipping sauce
- taima (大麻): hemp seed
- sobamugi (蕎麦): buckwheat
- hadakamugi (裸麦): Highland barley
- nari (蘇鉄): made from cycad pulp, Buddhist temple diet
- gokoku (五穀): "five-grain": soy, wheat, barley, proso millet, and foxtail millet

Many regions have their own specific variation on the miso standard. For example, the soybeans used in Sendai miso are much more coarsely mashed than in normal soy miso.

Miso made with rice such as shinshu miso (信州味噌) and shiro miso (白味噌) is called kome miso (米味噌).

== Types and flavor ==
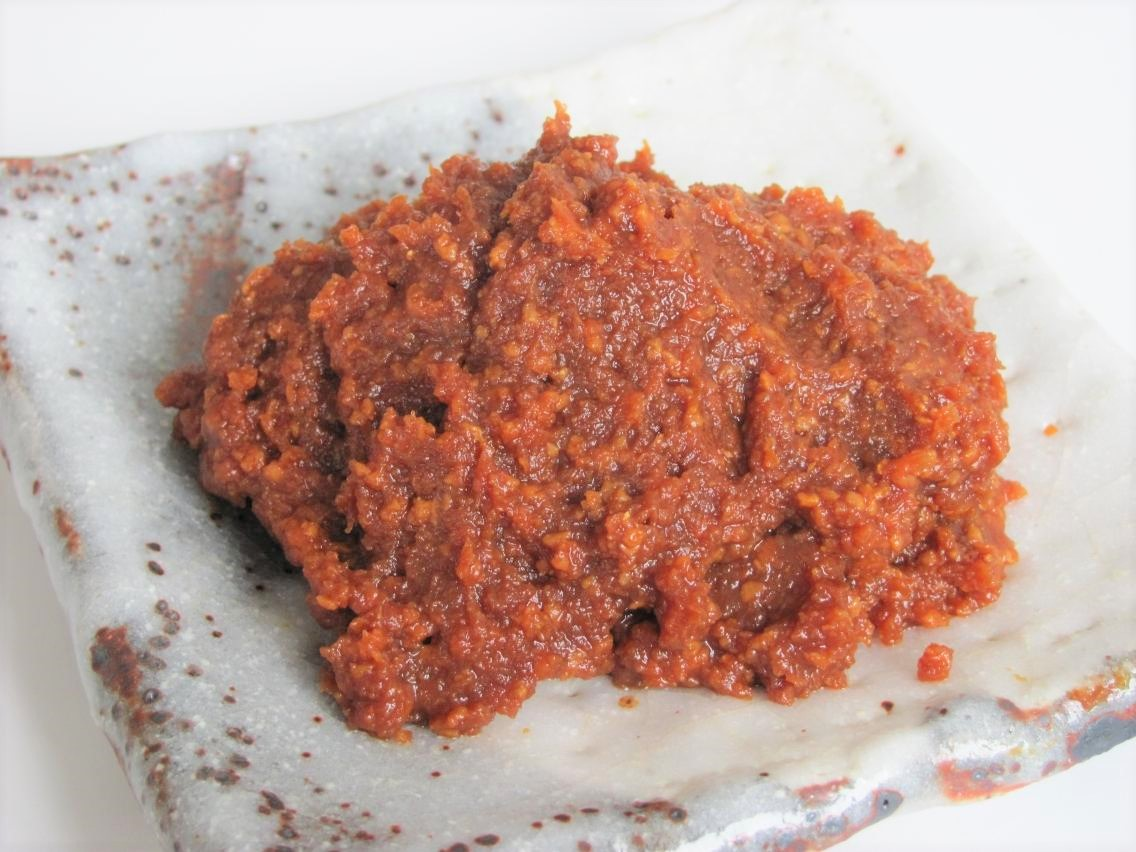
Akamiso (red miso) has a reddish-brown color.

Miso's taste, aroma, texture, and appearance vary by region and season. Other important variables that contribute to a particular miso's flavor include temperature, fermentation duration, salt content, variety of kōji, and fermenting vessel. The most common flavor categories of miso are:

- Shiromiso (白味噌), "white miso"
- Akamiso (赤味噌), "red miso"
- Awasemiso (合わせ味噌), "mixed miso"

Although white and red (shiromiso and akamiso) are the most common misos available, different varieties may be preferred in particular regions of Japan. In the eastern Kantō region that includes Tokyo, the darker brownish akamiso is popular while in the western Kansai region encompassing Osaka, Kyoto, and Kobe, the lighter shiromiso is preferred.

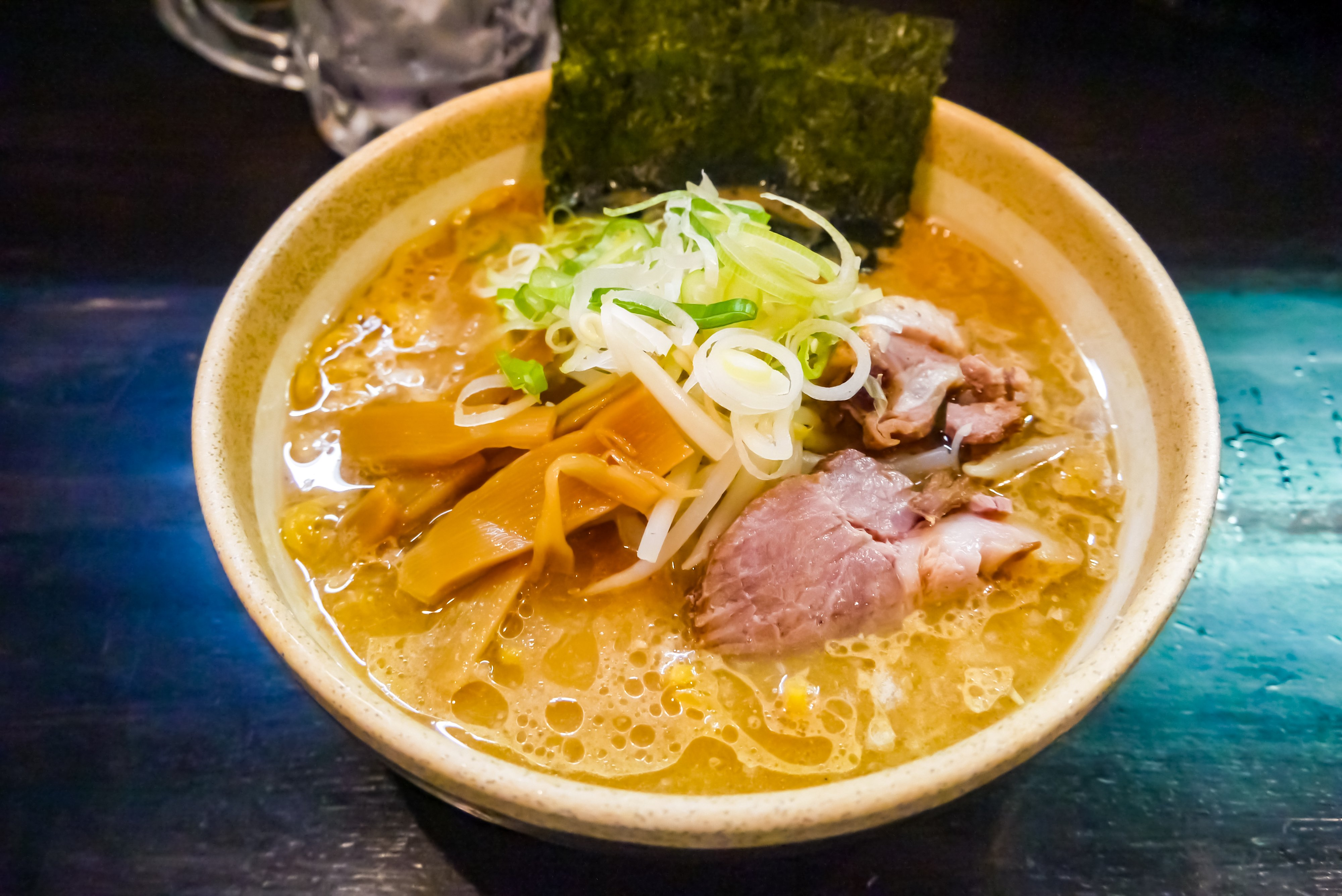
Bowl of ramen with miso broth

A more nuanced breakdown of the flavors is as follows:

- Kome miso (米味噌) or "rice miso" can be yellow, yellowish white, red, etc. Whitish miso is made from boiled soybeans, and reddish miso is made from steamed soybeans. Kome miso is consumed more in eastern Japan and the Hokuriku and Kinki areas.
- Mugi miso (麦味噌) or "barley miso" is a whitish miso produced in Kyushu, western Chugoku, and Shikoku areas. Another reddish mugi miso is produced in the northern Kanto area. Mugi miso has a peculiar smell.
- Mame miso (豆味噌) or "soybean miso" is a darker, more reddish brown than kome miso. This is not as sweet as some other varieties, but it has some astringency and good umami (旨味) flavor. This miso requires a long maturing term. Mame miso is consumed mostly in Aichi prefecture, Gifu prefecture, and Mie prefecture. Soybean (grain-free) miso is also labeled hatchō miso (八丁味噌). Hatchō miso is an Okazaki, Aichi specialty and has its origins in Mikawa Province during the Sengoku period. The processing method with large wooden barrels and stones on the lid remains unchanged.
- Chōgō (調合) or Awase (合わせ) miso, or "mixed miso", comes in many types because it is a mixture or compound of other varieties of miso. This may improve the weak points of each type of miso. For example, mame miso is very salty, but when combined with kome miso, the finished product has a mild taste.
- Akamiso (赤味噌) or red miso is aged, sometimes for more than one year. As a result, due to the Maillard reaction, the color changes gradually from white to red or black, thus giving it the name red miso. Characteristics of the flavor are saltiness and some astringency with umami. It is often a much stronger-tasting miso. Factors in the depth of color are the formula of the soybeans and the quantity used. Generally, steamed soybeans are more deeply colored than boiled soybeans.
- Shiromiso (白味噌) or white miso is the most widely produced miso, made in many regions of the country. Its main ingredients are rice, barley, and a small quantity of soybeans. If more soybeans were added, the miso would be red or brown. Compared with red miso, white miso has a very short fermentation time. The taste is sweet, and the umami is soft or light (compared to red miso).

=== Chemical properties of flavor and aroma compounds ===
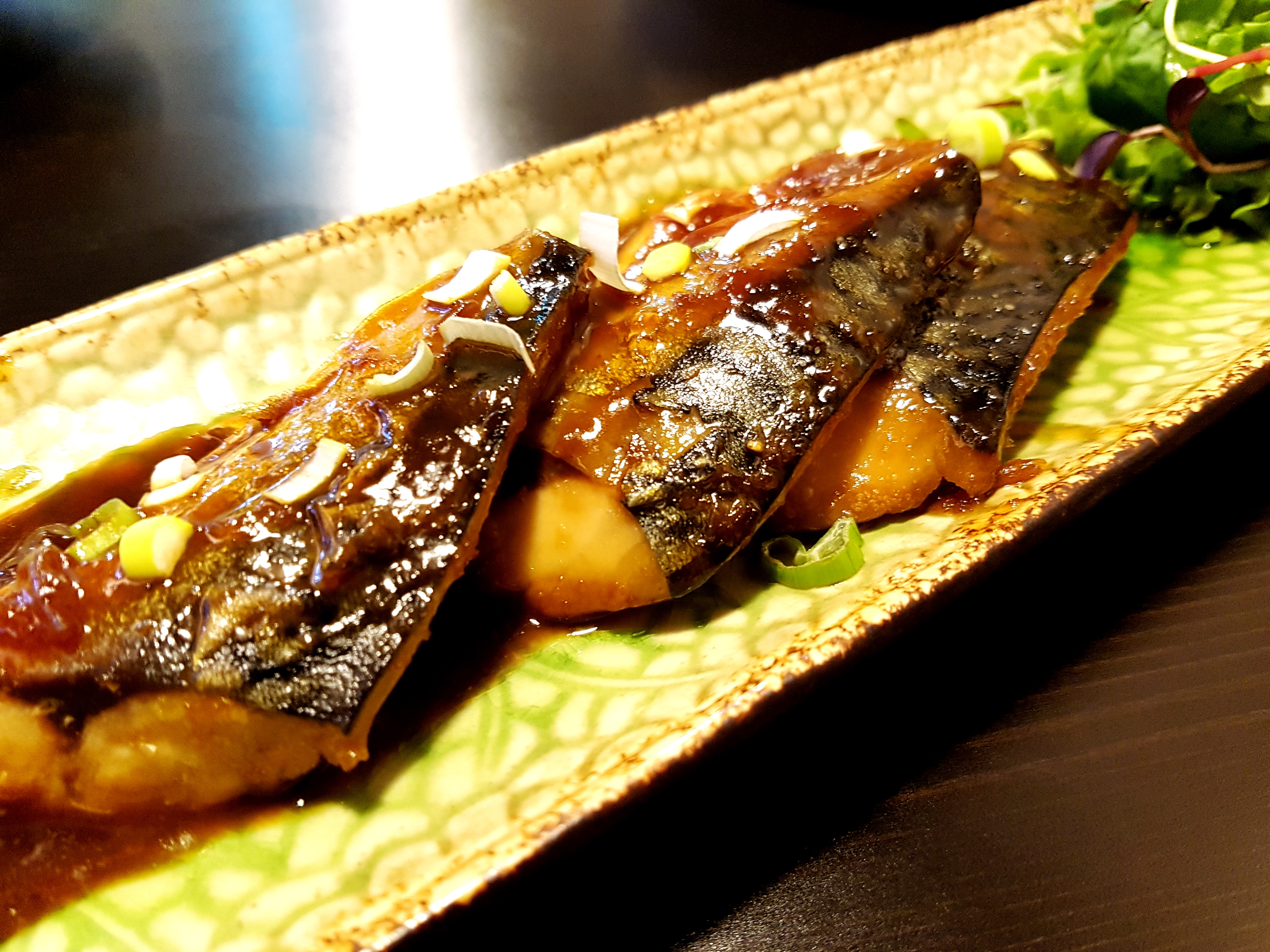
Miso used to flavor saba

The distinct and unique aroma of miso determines its quality. Many reactions occur among the components of miso, primarily the Maillard reaction, a non-enzymatic reaction of an amino group with a reducing sugar. The volatile compounds produced from this reaction give miso its characteristic flavor and aroma. Depending on the microorganism in combination with the variety of soybean or cereal used, many flavor compounds are produced that give rise to the different types of miso. Fermentation products such as furanone compounds, including 4-hydroxy-2(or 5)-ethyl-5(or 2)-methyl-3(2H)-furanone (HEMF) and 4-hydroxy-2,5 dimethyl-3(2H)-furanone (HDMF) are novel flavor compounds of miso. HEMF is especially known for its sweet aroma and is very important for the sensory evaluation of the aroma of rice miso.

The unique sensory properties of miso are complex. The key factor in the final product's overall quality is the microorganisms' enzymatic activity. They use the composition of miso (rice, barley, and soybeans) to produce different pigments, flavors, and aroma compounds.

Proteolysis of soybean protein produces constituent amino acids that impart an umami taste that enhances the relatively dull taste of soybean by itself. Soy protein contains a substantial amount of glutamate, the salt of which is known as MSG or monosodium glutamate, a popular ingredient used by food manufacturers to improve the taste of their products. The umami effect of MSG itself is one-dimensional. The umami taste of miso is multidimensional because of the myriad amino acids and fermentation products.

Barley miso is a traditional farmhouse variety made for personal use. Often called "rural miso", domestic barley is used more than imported barley. Containing glutamic acid and aromatic compounds such as ferulic acid and vanillic acid, barley miso is distinguished by a characteristic flavor.

== Fermentation ==
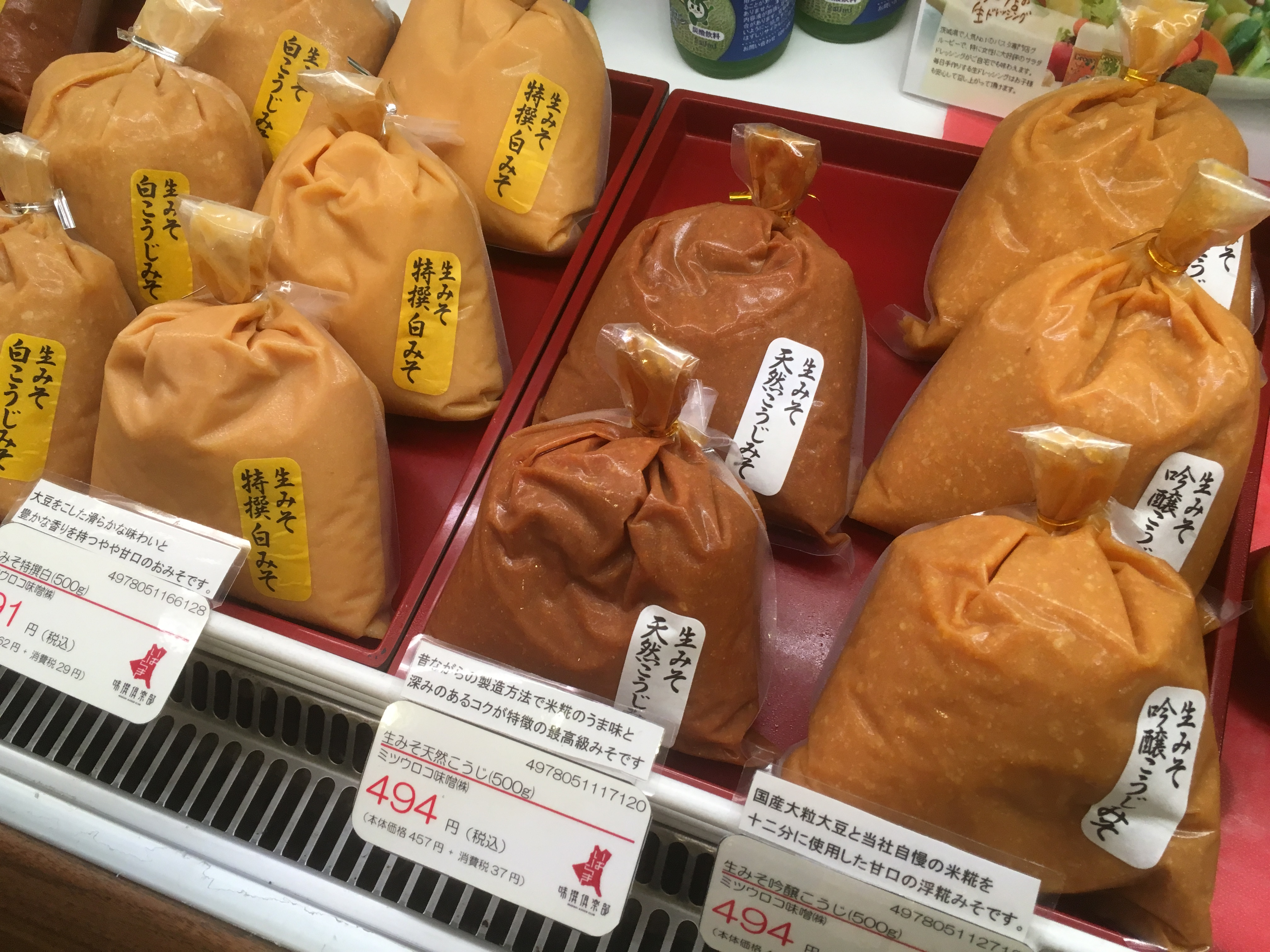
Fresh miso sold in Mito City, Japan

Miso's unique properties and flavor profile can be attributed to the compounds produced through the fermentation process. Miso, depending on the variety, consists of a starter culture called kōji (麹), soybeans, and usually a grain (either rice, barley, or rye). The miso goes through a two-step process; first creating the kōji, and second the kōji is combined with the other components, and the mixture is left to be enzymatically digested, fermented and aged.

=== Creating koji ===
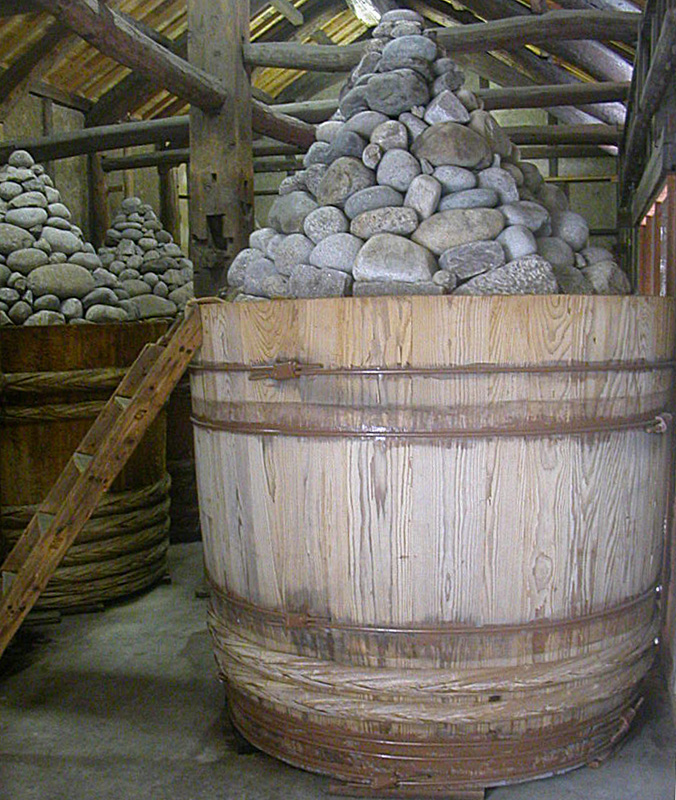
Hatchō miso fermenting in barrels

Koji is produced by introducing the mold Aspergillus oryzae onto steamed white rice. This mold culture comes from dried A. oryzae spores called tane-kōji (種麹, たねこうじ) or "starter koji" and is isolated from plant matter (usually rice) and cultivated. In the past, the natural presence of A. oryzae spores was relied upon to create koji, but because of the difficulty of producing the culture, tane-kōji is added almost universally in both industrial and traditional production of miso. Tane-kōji is produced much in the same way as koji, but also has a small portion of wood ash added to the mixture which gives important nutrients to the fungus as well as promoting sporulation.

A. oryzae is an aerobic fungus and is the most active fermenting agent in koji as it produces amylolytic, and proteolytic enzymes which are essential to creating the final miso product. Amylolytic enzymes such as amylase aid in the breakdown of starch in the grains to sugar and dextrin, while proteolytic enzymes such as protease catalyze the breakdown of proteins into smaller peptides or amino acids. These both aid in the enzymatic digestion of rice and soybeans. Depending on the strain of A. oryzae, the enzymatic composition varies, thereby changing the characteristics of the final miso product. For example, the strain used to create the sweeter white miso would likely produce a higher content of amylolytic enzymes, while comparatively, soybean miso might have a higher content of proteolytic enzymes.

To create optimal conditions for enzymatic production and the growth of A. oryzae, the koji's environment must be carefully regulated. Temperature, humidity, and oxygen content are all important factors in maximizing mold growth and enzyme production and preventing other harmful bacteria from producing. Once the koji has reached a desirable flavor profile, it is usually mixed with salt to prevent further fermentation.

Although other strains of fungi have been used to produce koji, A. oryzae is the most desirable because of several properties, including the fact that it does not produce aflatoxin.

== Storage and preparation ==
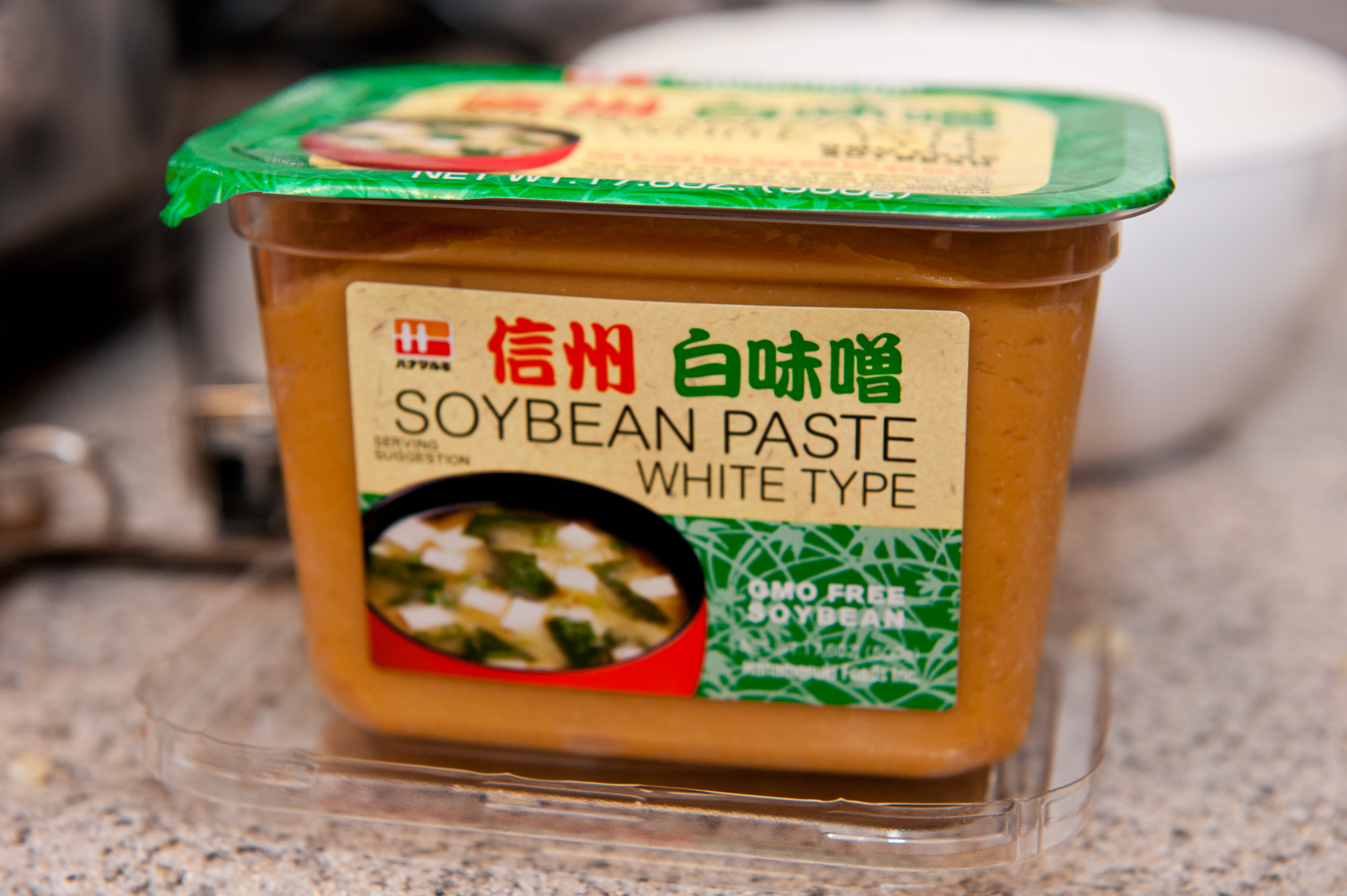
Miso is often sold in square containers

Miso typically comes as a paste in a sealed container requiring refrigeration after opening. Natural miso is a living food containing many beneficial microorganisms such as Tetragenococcus halophilus, which can be killed by overcooking. For this reason, the miso should be added to soups or other foods prepared just before they are removed from the heat.

== Usage ==
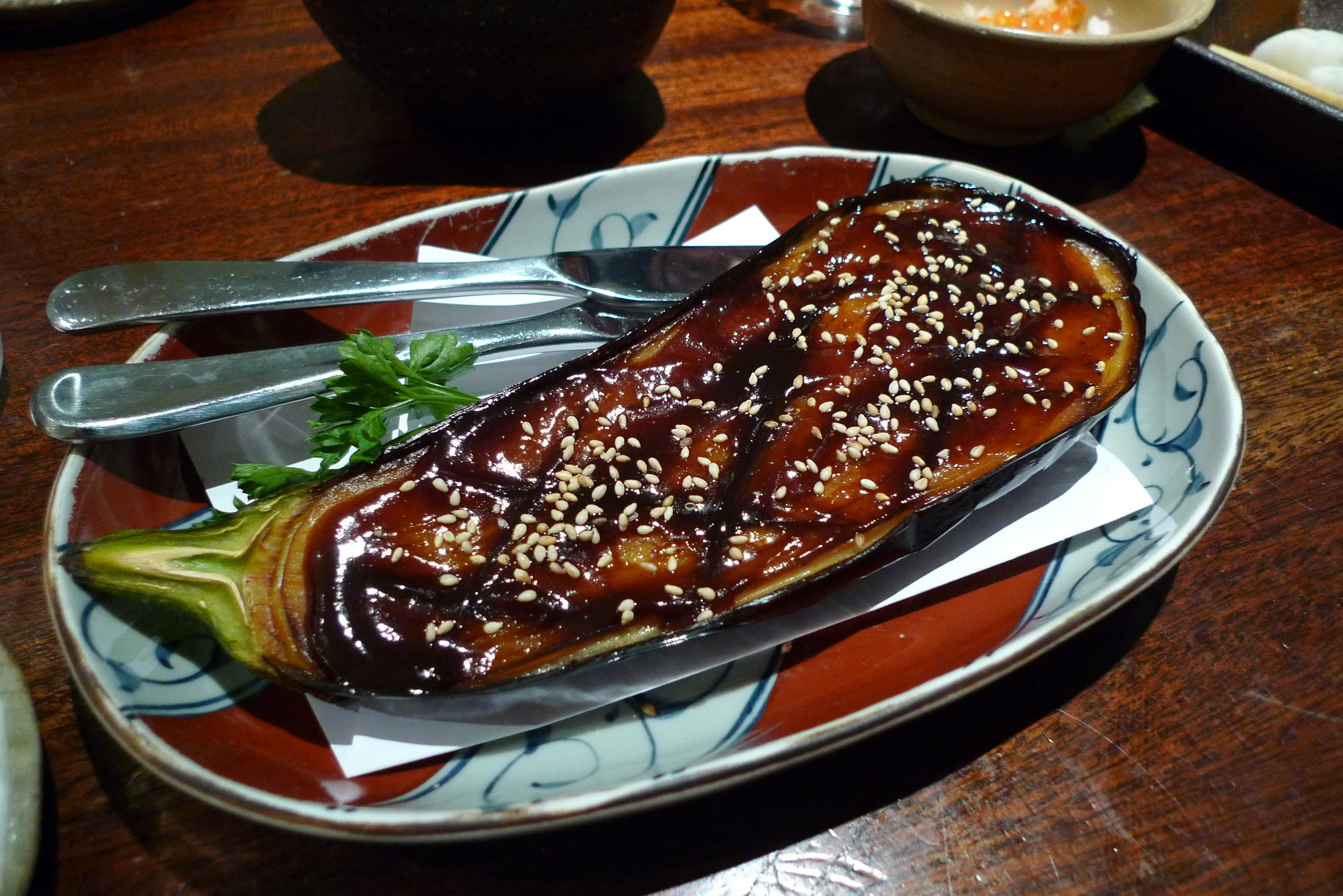
Nasu dengaku, or eggplant with miso sauce

Miso is a part of many Japanese-style meals. It most commonly appears as the main ingredient of miso soup, which is eaten daily by much of the Japanese population. The pairing of plain rice and miso soup is a fundamental unit of Japanese cuisine. This pairing is the basis of a traditional Japanese breakfast.

Miso is used in many other types of soup and soup-like dishes, including some kinds of ramen, udon, nabe, and imoni. Generally, such dishes have the title miso prefixed to their name (for example, miso-udon) and have a heavier, earthier flavor and aroma than other Japanese soups that are not miso-based.

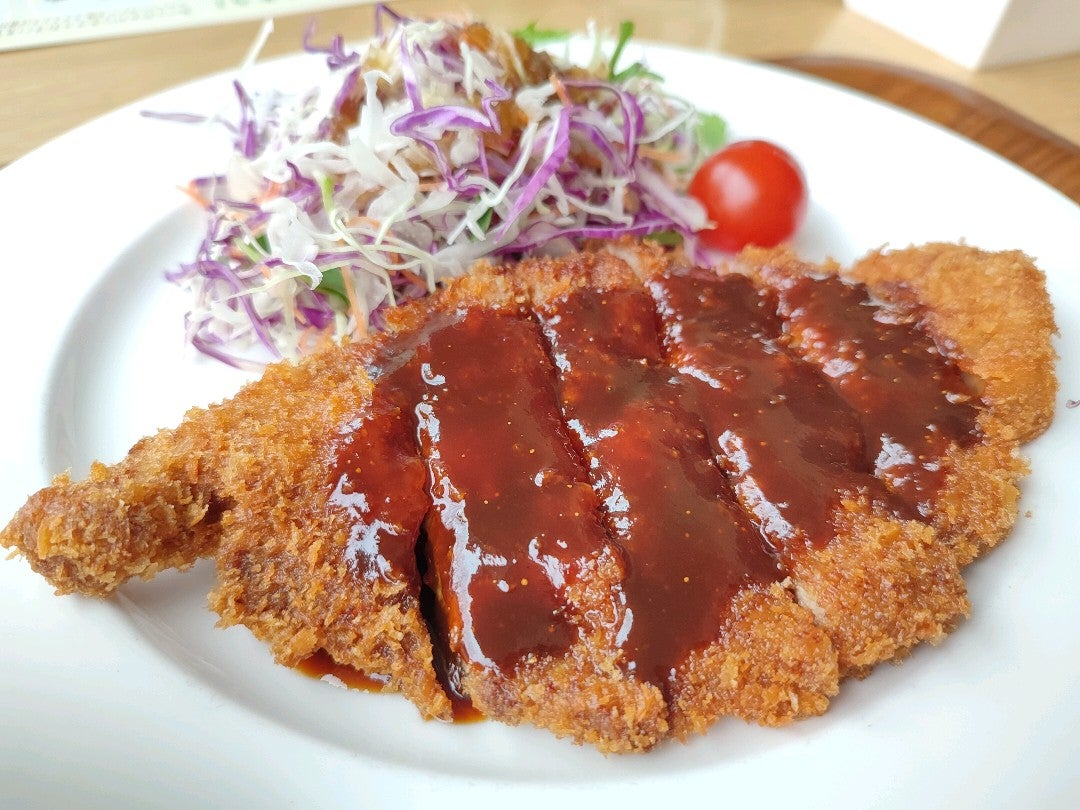
Tonkatsu (fried pork cutlet) with miso based sauce

Many traditional confections use a sweet, thick miso glaze, such as mochi and dango. Miso-glazed treats are strongly associated with Japanese festivals, although they are available year-round at supermarkets. The consistency of miso glaze ranges from thick and taffy-like to thin and drippy.

Soybean miso is used to make a type of pickle called misozuke. These pickles are typically made from cucumber, daikon, napa cabbage, or eggplant, and are sweeter and less salty than the standard Japanese salt pickle.

Other foods with miso as an ingredient include:

- dengaku (miso sweetened with molasses used for grilling)
- yakimochi (charcoal-grilled mochi covered in miso)
- miso-braised vegetables or mushrooms
- marinades: fish or chicken can be mixed with miso and rice wine overnight to be grilled
- corn on the cob in Japan is often coated with shiro miso, wrapped in foil and grilled
- sauces: sauces like misoyaki (a variant on teriyaki)
- dips: used as a dip to eat with vegetables (e.g., cucumbers, daikon, carrots, etc.)
- side dish: miso is often eaten as a condiment and a side dish. Mixed or cooked miso with spices or vegetables is called okazu-miso (おかず味噌), often eaten along with hot rice or spread over onigiri
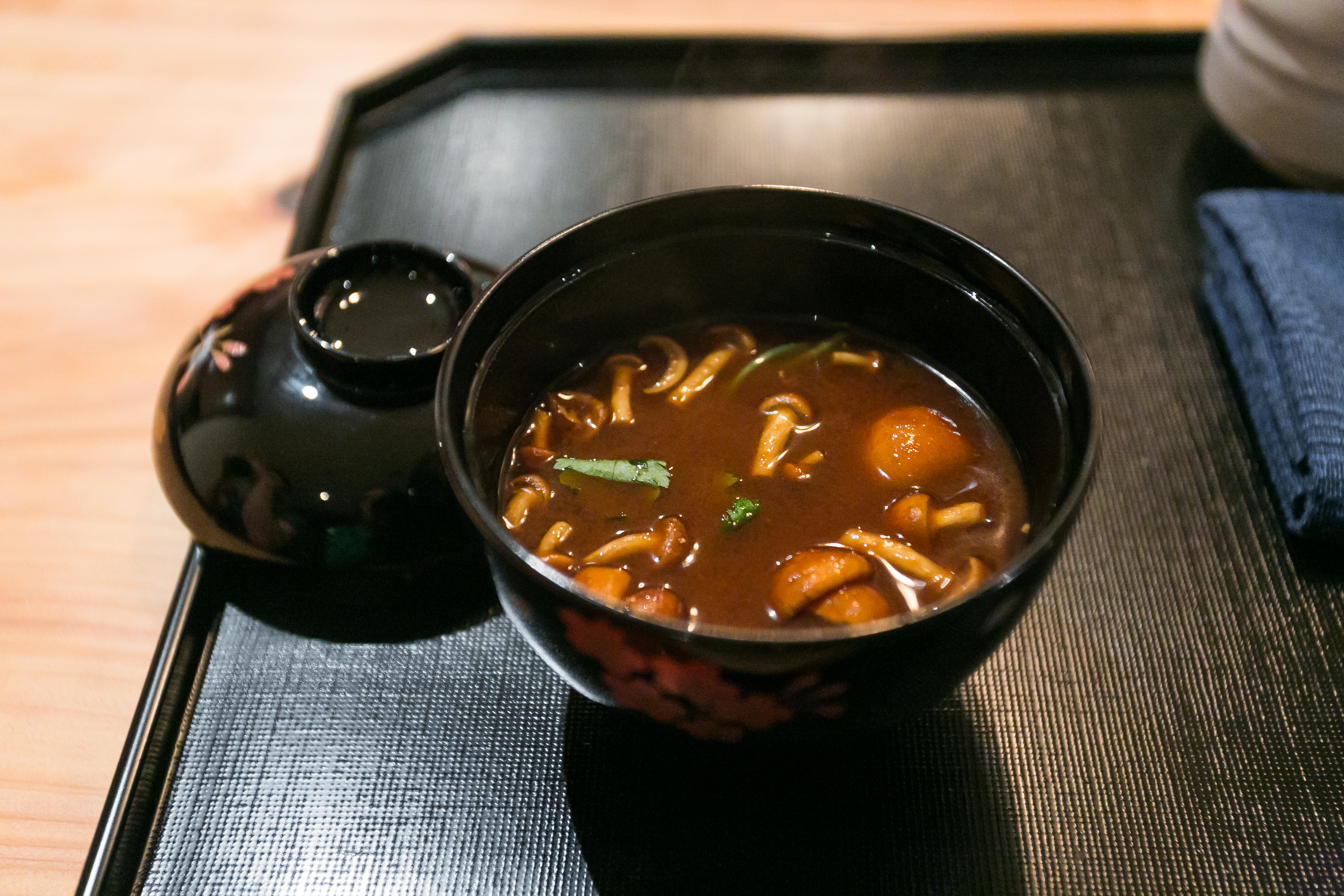
Dark miso soup

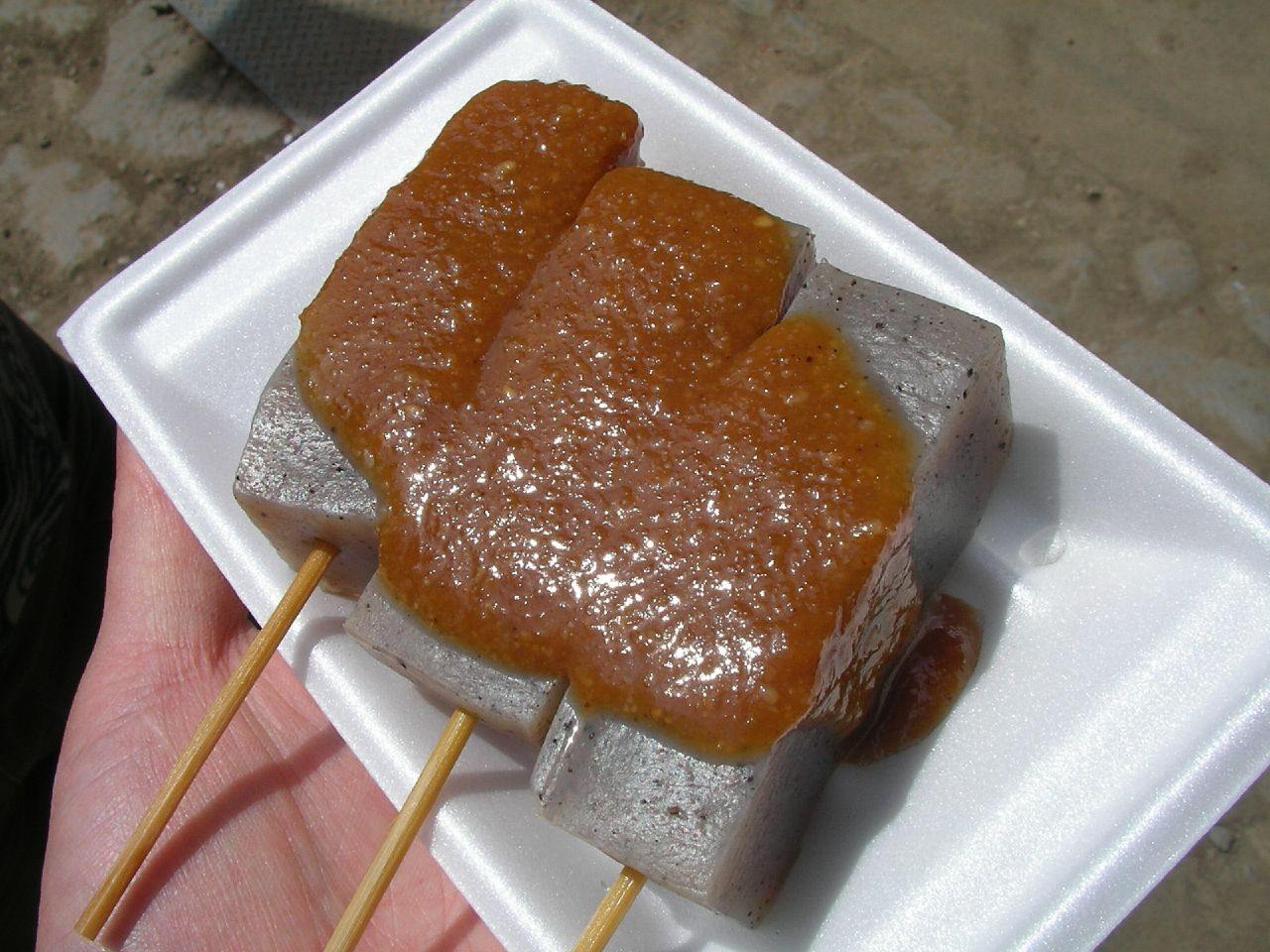
Miso on konnyaku as oden

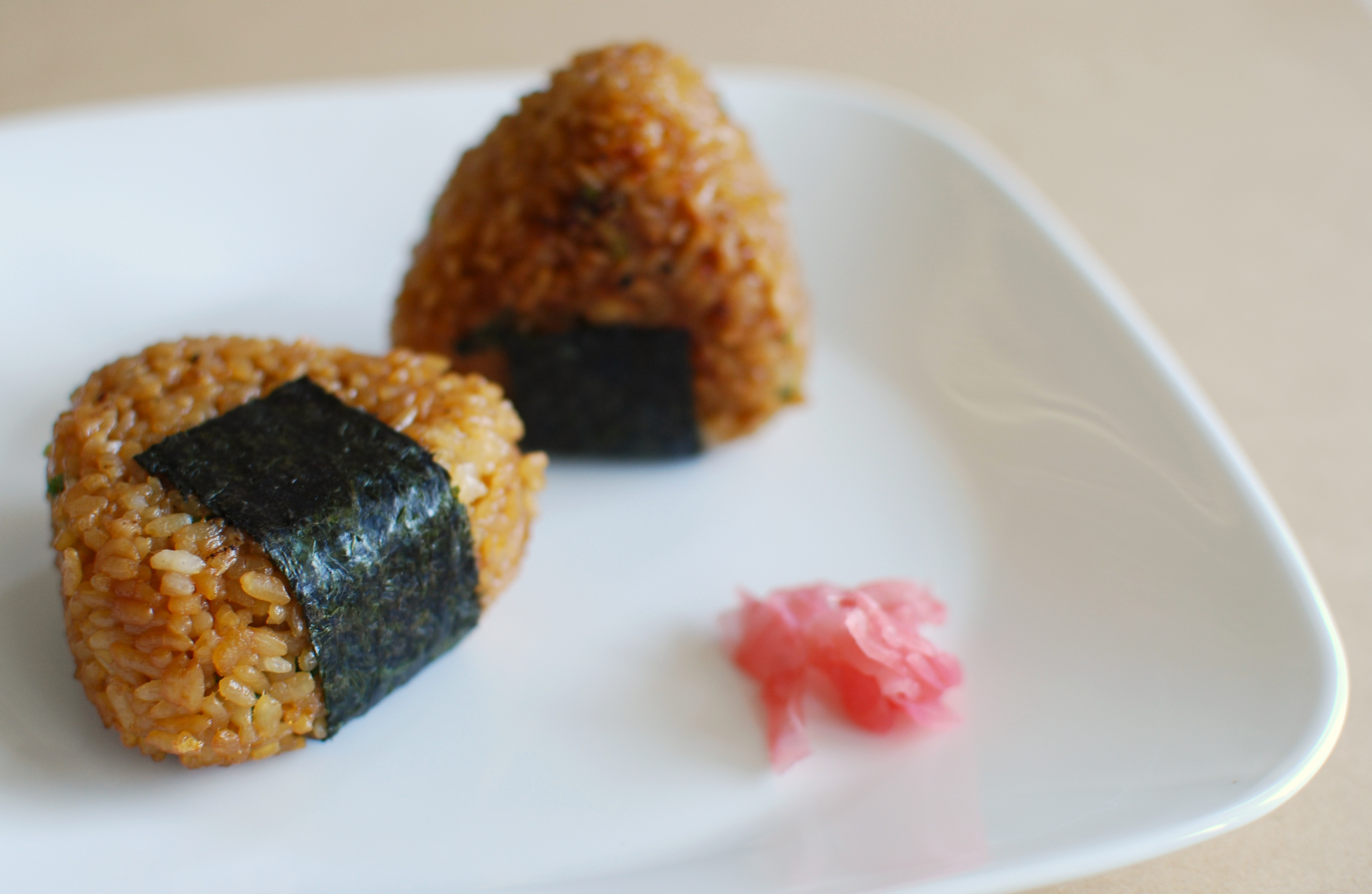
Miso onigiri

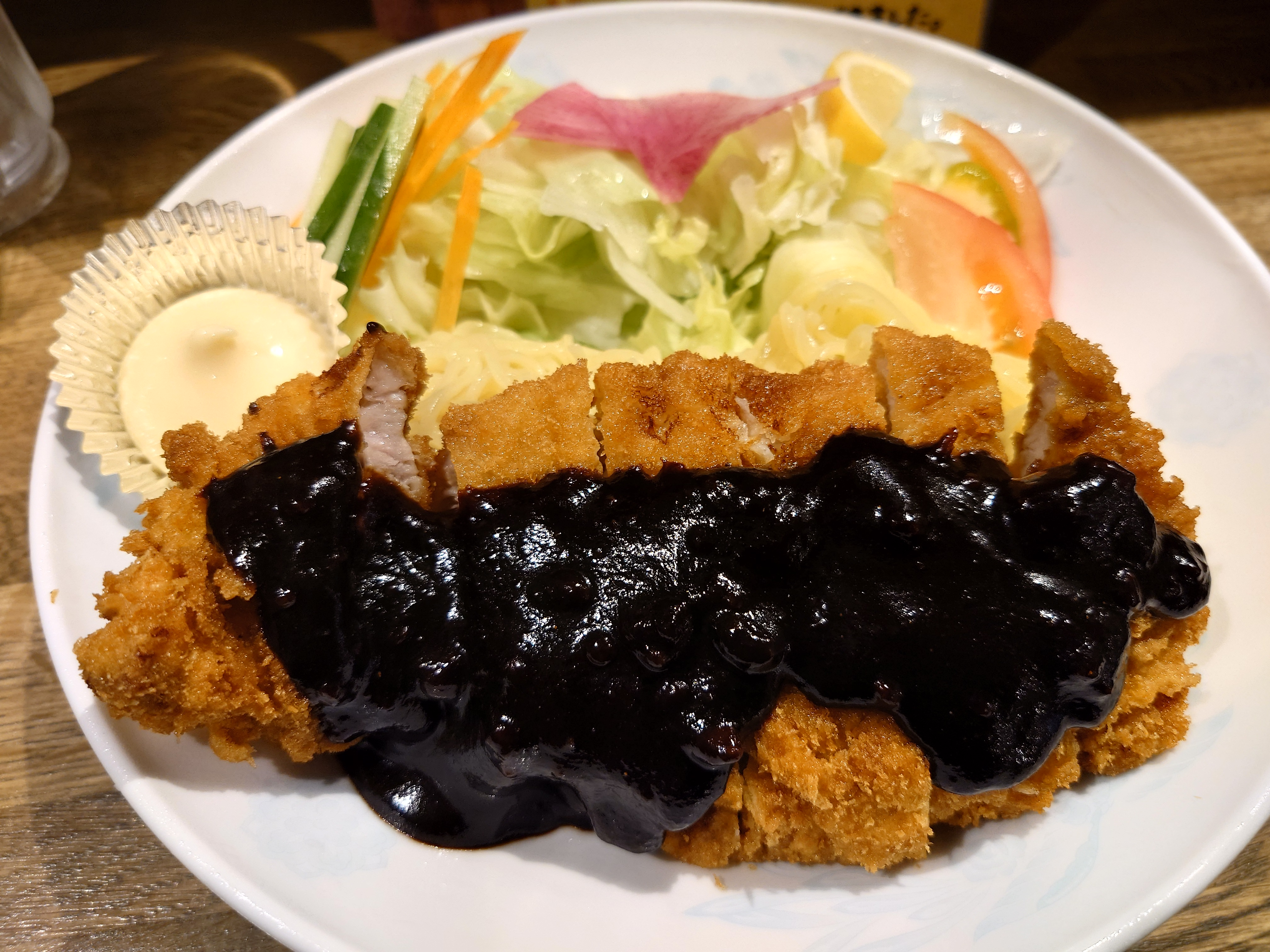
Dark miso sauce on tonkatsu

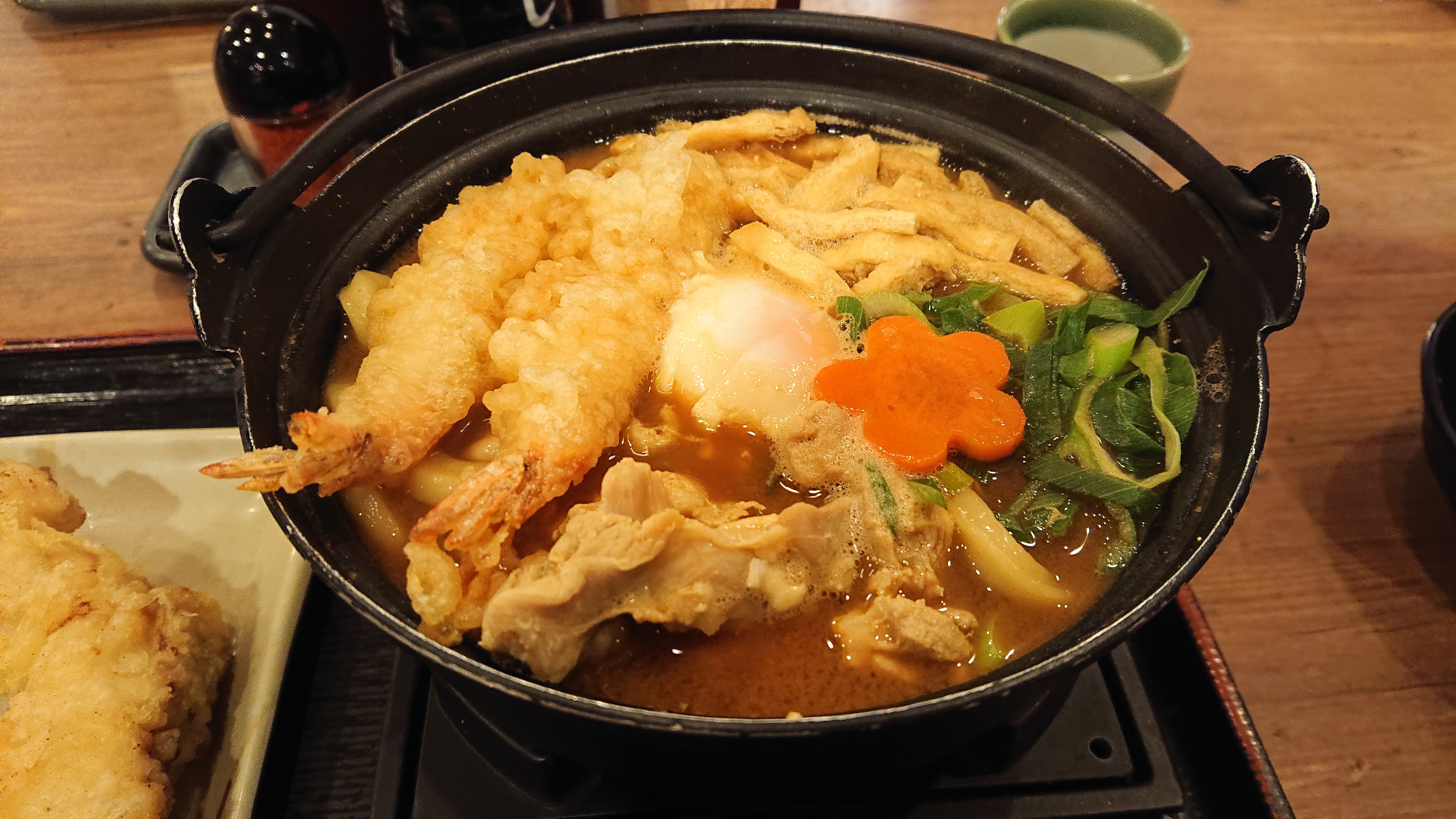
Miso udon with tempura

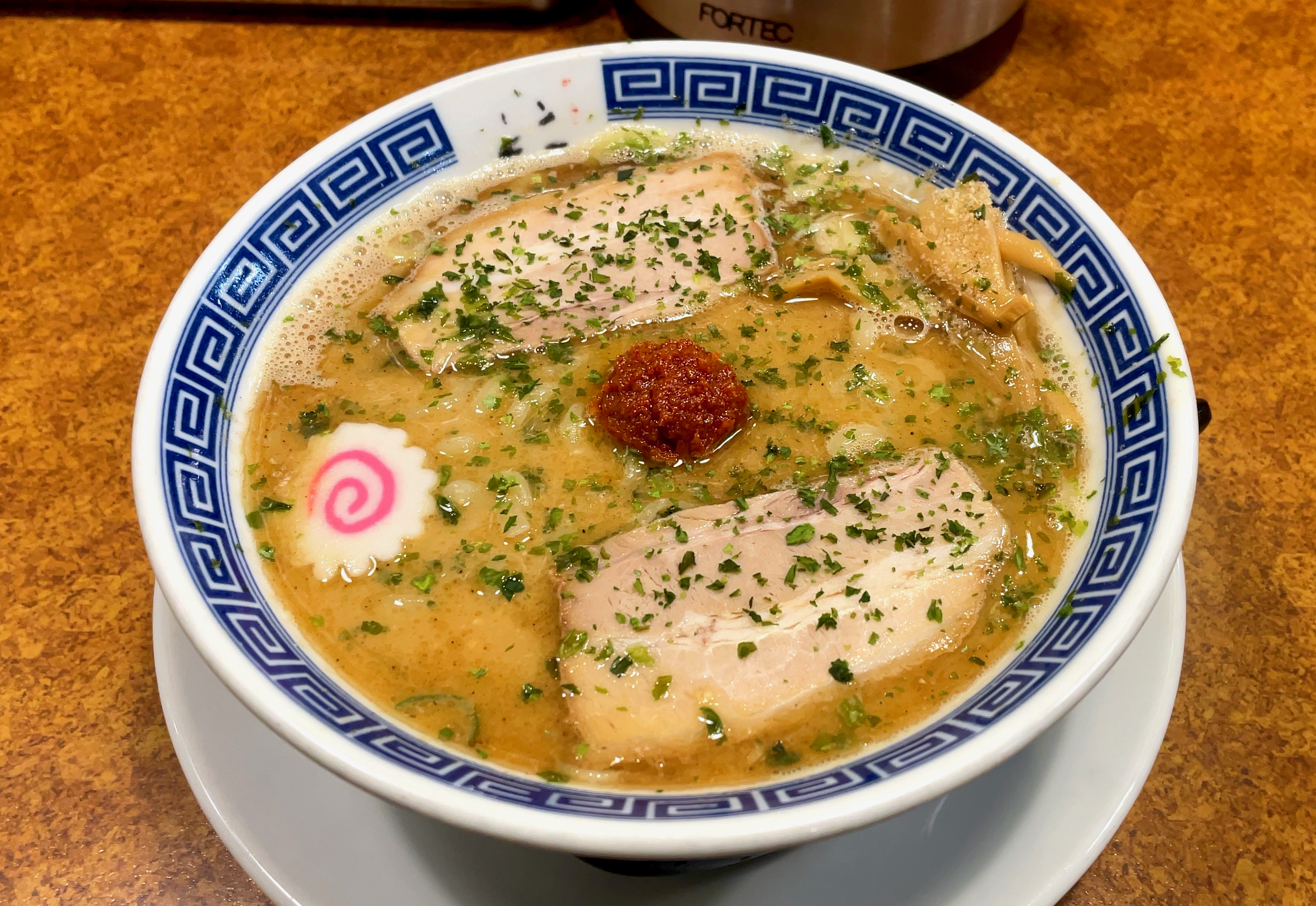
Miso ramen

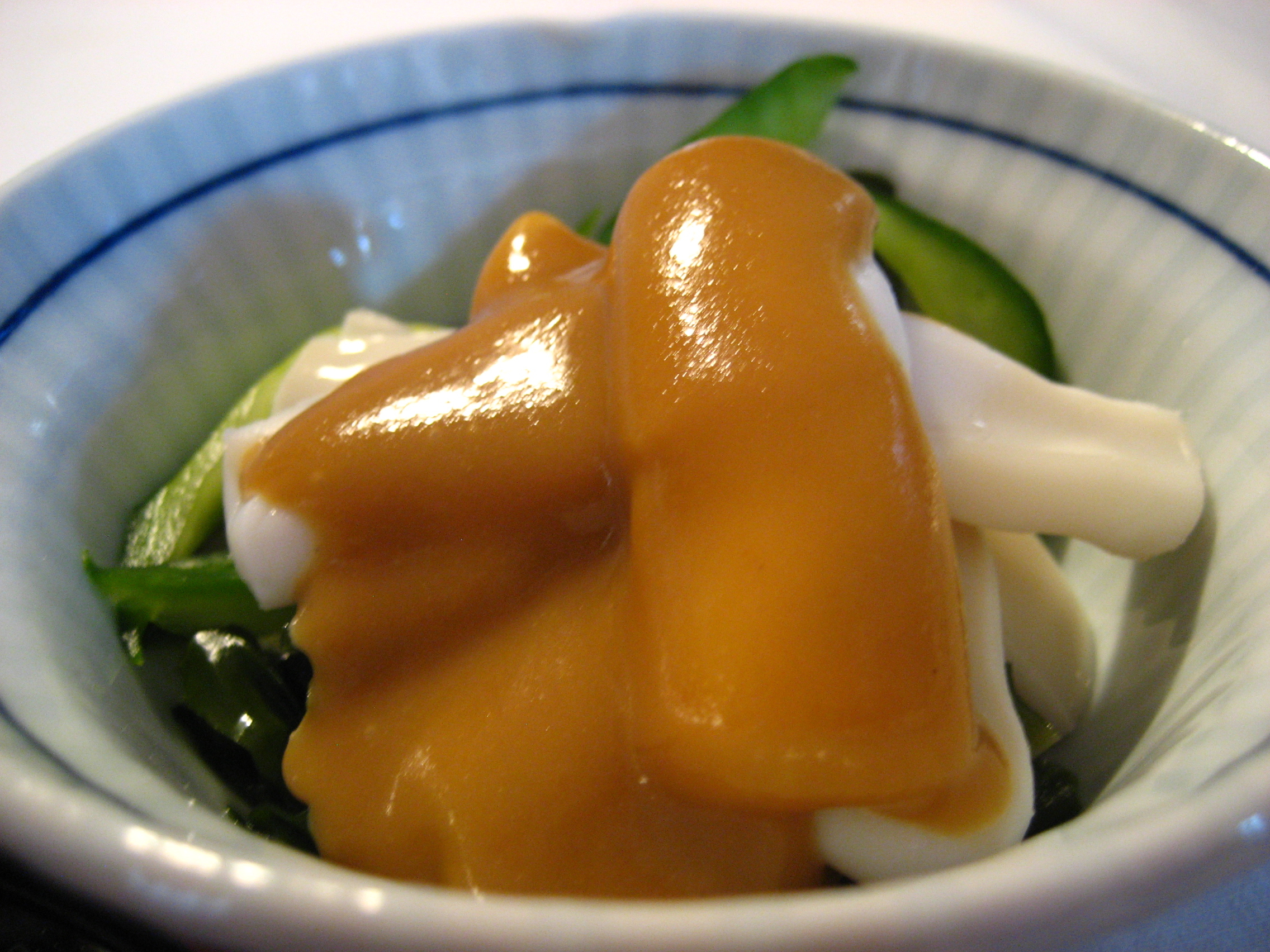
Miso on cucumber and squid salad

== Nutrition and health ==
Claims that miso is high in vitamin B_{12} have been contradicted in some studies.

Some experts suggest that miso is a source of Lactobacillus acidophilus. Miso is relatively high in salt which could contribute to increased blood pressure in the small percentage of the population with sodium-sensitive prehypertension or hypertension. Several studies using salt-sensitive hypertensive models and analyzing long-term intake have suggested that miso lessens salt's effects on blood pressure.

== See also ==
- Dòubànjiàng (豆瓣醬)
- Doenjang (된장)
- Dòuchǐ (豆豉)
- Hozon (保存)
- Fermented bean paste
- List of fermented soy products
- Marukome (マルコメ), a Japanese miso soup paste producer
- Soy sauce
- Tauco (Chinese: 豆醬; pinyin: dòujiàng; Pe̍h-ōe-jī: tāu-chiùⁿ)
- Tương
- Yellow soybean paste
- Nattō (納豆)
- Marmite Yeast extract
