= Oral ecology =

Study of microorganisms in the mouth

Oral ecology is the microbial ecology of the microorganisms found in mouths. Oral ecology, like all forms of ecology, involves the study of the living things found in oral cavities as well as their interactions with each other and with their environment. Oral ecology is frequently investigated from the perspective of oral disease prevention, often focusing on conditions such as dental caries (or "cavities"), candidiasis ("thrush"), gingivitis, periodontal disease, and others. However, many of the interactions between the microbiota and oral environment protect from disease and support a healthy oral cavity. Interactions between microbes and their environment can result in the stabilization or destabilization of the oral microbiome, with destabilization believed to result in disease states. Destabilization of the microbiome can be influenced by several factors, including diet changes, drugs or immune system disorders.

== History ==
Bacteria were first detected under the microscope of Dutch scientist Anton van Leeuwenhoek in the late 17th century from his own healthy human oral sample. After using this technology on a healthy sample, Leeuwenhoek applied his tool to the decayed tooth matter of his wife, where he noted that the organisms present were highly similar to those found in cheese. These are believed to likely have been lactic acid bacteria, however the link between bacterial acid production and tooth decay was not further uncovered until much later. After this discovery and the further development of microscopy, bacteria was found within tooth cavities by multiple scientists throughout the 19th century. Willoughby Miller was the first recorded oral microbiologist, and he performed much of his foundational microbiology research in the laboratory of famed microbiologist Robert Koch. In this time, Miller generated the chemo-parasitic (also referred to as "acidogenic") theory of caries, which proposed that tooth decay is initiated by bacterial acid production on the surface of teeth. This theory is considered to be foundational to the field of dentistry as well as oral ecology, by drawing connections between the activities of microbial entities and its effects on their non-living microscopic environment.

In ecological terms, early work in oral microbiology largely falls into a category of microbial research now described as "reductionist", generally meaning it focused heavily on the isolation of individual microbes before observation or testing. It wasn't until the late 20th century that "holistic" approaches to oral microbiology were coming into the mainstream, and thus microbial ecology was intentionally studied. Holistic microbiology considers not only an organism of interest but also the biological and abiotic context in which the organism naturally is found. Scientist Philip Marsh is credited with developing the ecological plaque hypothesis in 1994, in which he ideated that dental plaque can be both normal and healthy as well as "cariogenic" (creates cavities), depending on the microbial community (or "consortia") present in the biofilm and the community's stability. Furthermore, in his theory, Marsh links the exposure of nonliving environmental influences on the microbial community to the selection and change in microbial constituents that can cause cariogenic conditions.

== Oral environment ==
Teeth, saliva, and oral tissues are the major components of the oral environment in which the oral microbiome resides. Like most environments, some oral environments, such as teeth and saliva, are abiotic (non-living), and some are living, such as the host immune system or host mouth mucosal tissues- including gums, cheek ("buccal") and tongue (when present).

=== Abiotic ===
Saliva holds multiple roles in oral ecology. For example, it creates a physical disturbance to microbes through a washing action. Increase in saliva flow via stimulation (i.e. chewing gum) has been shown to diminish cariogenic plaque formation. Saliva is also largely responsible for environmental pH, water content, nutrients, and host-produced immune cells and antimicrobials. One major antimicrobial found in saliva (as well as mucus) is lysozyme, an enzyme that shears bacterial cells. Another critical role that saliva plays in the microscopic environment is supplying the glycoproteins bacteria use to cling to the surface of teeth.

Teeth are another example of the abiotic environmental factors involved in oral ecology. Bacteria settle on the tooth surface as a solid substrate on which they grow. Compared to floating in saliva, bacteria on teeth gain environmental stability so that they experience a consistent environment of temperature, relative oxygen exposure, nutrient density, physical disturbances, etc. While teeth provide stability to the microbial community, the overgrowth of bacteria is known to result in tooth decay primarily due to acid production from sugar-consuming fermentative metabolisms. Some organisms associated with this condition are lactobacilli, which produce the lactic acid that breaks down tooth enamel. As a result, host diet also influences the ecology of the mouth by altering saliva pH and nutrient content. As a result the microbial life interacts with the oral environment.

Oxygen content is a major variable that can influence the type of microbial flora present in the oral cavity. This variable is slightly unique to the oral cavity due to its exposure to the outside of the host body. In ecology, niches are a set of conditions that can be associated with the presence of a certain organism. Thus, oxygen concentration variation throughout the mouth can be a factor in niche differentiation within this environment. At the microscopic scale, oxygen concentration can dictate where in the mouth aerobic, anaerobic, facultative anaerobic, aerotolerant, or microaerophilic microbes grow or form biofilm. Biofilms themselves can help regulate oxygen exposure and keep anaerobic organisms at the interior, adding to the complexity of the niches within the oral cavity.

Another abiotic environmental influence on oral ecology includes the use of drugs, especially antibiotics and orally-administered antibiotics. Antibiotics can kill oral bacteria as well as cause secondary environmental effects such as a decrease in saliva, leading to further changes in the abiotic microenvironment. The destabilization of the bacteria in a microbiome which results in disease is known as bacterial dysbiosis. For example, the destabilization of the bacterial community in the mouth can lead to a bloom in fungal communities, resulting in diseases such as thrush. Furthermore, the development of antibiotic-resistant populations in response to the treatment can result in an overpopulation of the resistant bacteria after treatment is completed, disturbing the relative abundances found pre-treatment.

=== Biotic (non-bacterial) ===
The host of the oral cavity in which the oral ecology is studied is also of importance. This is an example of a biotic, or living, environmental factor. General host health and immune system function is critical to oral microflora, as it determines which microbes are able to survive in the mouth. The innate immune system, which operates in animals continuously regardless of the presence of disease, is most relevant due to its constant role in oral ecology both in healthy and unhealthy hosts. This includes the production of free-floating antibodies, macrophages, and other immune cells present in saliva. At a healthy, stable state, the host immune system permits the colonization of certain microbes by not targeting them. This can be described as "immune equilibrium", or the conditions where the host and the microbiota in the oral microbiome symbiose.

== Human ==
=== Bacterial ===
In microbial ecology, the principle of priority effect refers to the competitive advantage some microorganisms gain by colonizing a surface first. It is generally believed that primary colonization occurs by transmission from the mother or their breastmilk (vertical transmission), as well as the environment of the newborn (horizontal transmission). It has been found that at different locations in the oral cavity, different microbes are early colonizers. The very initial colonizers of teeth are considered to be Streptococcus, a genus of bacteria that are usually facultative anaerobes that can grow in both aerobic and anaerobic conditions. This is advantageous in an environment that is variably exposed to oxygen throughout the day as well as throughout the oral cavity. Despite over 700 unique species of bacteria being associated with the human mouth, in tooth plaque only between 7-9 "major players" have been repeatedly identified as early colonizers, including Actinomyces, Streptococcus, Neisseria, and Veillonella species. It is believed that the colonization of these specific genera of bacteria influence the stability and homeostasis of the resulting oral microflora. This colonization occurs by the construction of and adhesion to a pellicle made of glycoproteins from host saliva. Upon adhesion to the pellicle, early colonizing bacteria begin to produce the biofilm intended to anchor the colony to the tooth. As is common in microbiomes, this biofilm does not remain a single genera or species. In fact, the vast majority of relevant microbes perform co-aggregation within a biofilm. However, it is understood that not all microbes will co-aggregate together, and ammensal activity does occur between specific species, such as S. mutans and P. gingivalis. The interbacterial interactions as well as the interactions with the host teeth, oxygen conditions, and saliva are what compose bacterial oral ecology.

=== Nonbacterial ===
Bacteria, while being the most abundant, are not the only kind of microbiota present in the oral cavity. Fungal/yeast cells are also present, particularly including the genus Candida. The yeast species C. albicans and C. tropicalis are known as commensals in the human mouth, which means that they are a part of normal flora that engages in a mutually-beneficial relationship with its host. They are the most abundant non-bacterial microbes isolated from the human mouth. As described in the above section, co-aggregation within a biofilm is not uncommon, including the cohabitation of yeasts with bacteria. Candida albicans is known to selectively participate in "dual-species" biofilms with certain species of Streptococcus bacteria through the actual attachment of the yeast to the bacterial cell surface. This allows the yeast to be anchored to the tooth surface indirectly to gain stability.

Some other, but significantly less abundant, non-bacterial microbes in the human mouth include the fungi genera Cryptococcus, Aspergillus, and Fusarium.
