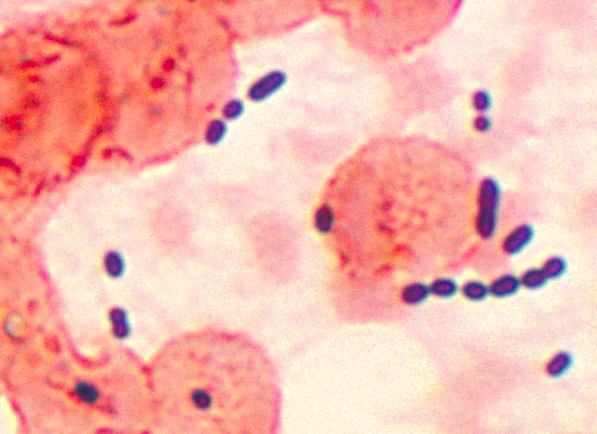
- Enterococcus sp. infection in pulmonary tissue.

Scientific classification
- Domain: Bacteria
- Kingdom: Bacillati
- Phylum: Bacillota
- Class: Bacilli
- Order: Lactobacillales
- Family: Enterococcaceae; Ludwig, Schleifer & Whitman 2010

Genera
- Bavariicoccus; Catellicoccus; Enterococcus; Melissococcus; Pilibacter; Tetragenococcus; Vagococcus

= Enterococcaceae =

Family of bacteria

The Enterococcaceae are a family of Gram-positive bacteria placed in the order Lactobacillales. Representative genera include Enterococcus, Melissococcus, Pilibacter, Tetragenococcus, and Vagococcus. In this family are some important lactic acid bacteria which produce lactic acid as the major metabolic end product.

== Phylogeny ==
The currently accepted taxonomy is based on the List of Prokaryotic names with Standing in Nomenclature (LPSN) and National Center for Biotechnology Information (NCBI).

16S rRNA based LTP_10_2024

- - - Vagococcaceae
      Vagococcus
  - - - Catellicoccaceae
        Catellicoccus
    - - - Enterococcaceae
          - - Enterococcus~1
            - Tetragenococcus
          - - Enterococcus
            - - - Melissococcus
                - Enterococcus~2
              - Enterococcus~3
      - - Enterococcus nangangensis
        - - Pilibacter
          - Streptococcaceae

120 marker proteins based GTDB 09-RS220

- - - - Catellicoccaceae
        Catellicoccus Lawson et al. 2006
    - - Vagococcaceae
        Vagococcus Collins et al. 1990
      - Enterococcaceae
        - Enterococcus_J
        - - Enterococcus canis De Gradf et al. 2003
          - - - Melissococcus corrig.Bailey & Collins 1983
              - Enterococcus Thiercelin & Jouhaud 1903 ex Schleifer & Kilpper-Bälz 1984
            - - Enterococcus_B
              - - Enterococcus_A
                - - Enterococcus_C
                  - - Enterococcus_D
                    - - Enterococcus_E & G
                      - - Enterococcus_F & I
                        - Tetragenococcus Collins, Williams & Wallbanks 1993
  - - Streptococcaceae
      - Pilibacter
      - other
