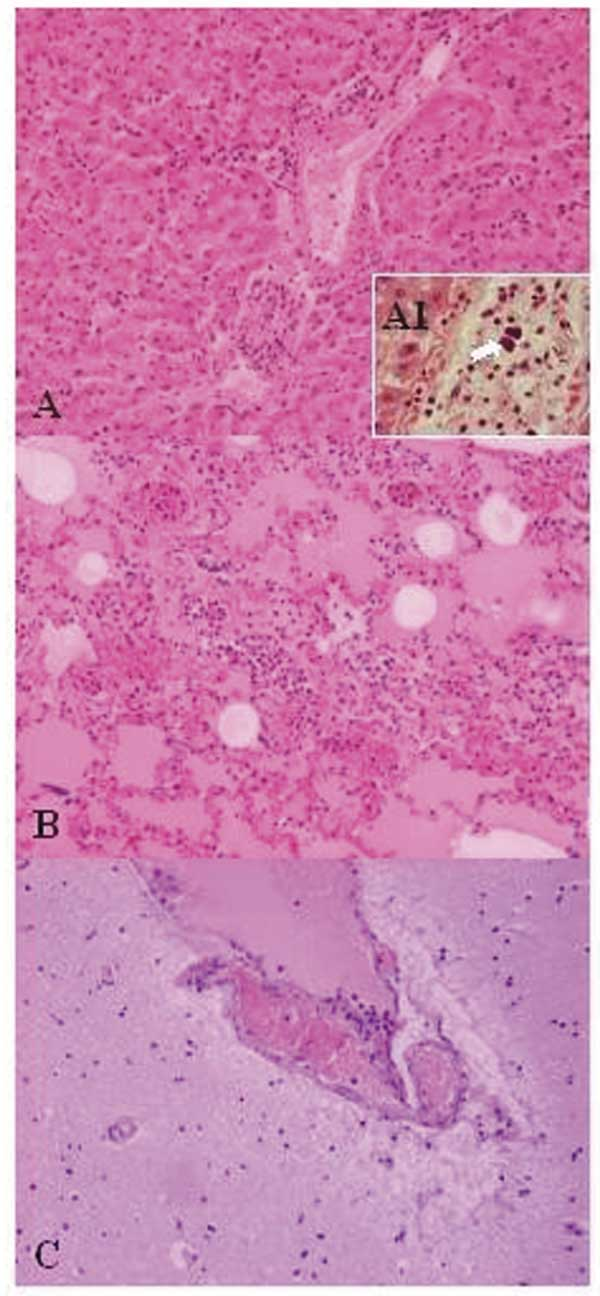
- Lesions of Weissella confusa in the mona monkey (hematoxylin and eosin stain): A) liver: portal triads with neutrophilic infiltration (x10); A1, presence of bacterial emboli inside the vein (arrow) (x40). B) acute pneumonia: edema, congestion, and leukocyte cells exudation in the pulmonary alveoli (x10). C) encephalitis: congestion and marginalized neutrophils in nervous vessels (x10)

Scientific classification
- Domain: Bacteria
- Kingdom: Bacillati
- Phylum: Bacillota
- Class: Bacilli
- Order: Lactobacillales; Ludwig, Schleifer & Whitman 2010

Families
- Aerococcaceae; Carnobacteriaceae; Catellicoccaceae; Enterococcaceae; Lactobacillaceae; Streptococcaceae; Vagococcaceae; Genera incertae sedis; "Aerosphaera"; "Carnococcus"

Synonyms
- "Coccales" Krasilnikov 1949; "Plocamobacteriales" Pribram 1933

= Lactic acid bacteria =

Order of bacteria

Lactobacillales are an order of gram-positive, low-GC, acid-tolerant, generally nonsporulating, nonrespiring, either rod-shaped (bacilli) or spherical (cocci) bacteria that share common metabolic and physiological characteristics. These bacteria, usually found in decomposing plants and milk products, produce lactic acid as the major metabolic end product of carbohydrate fermentation, giving them the common name lactic acid bacteria (LAB).

Production of lactic acid has linked LAB with food fermentations, as acidification inhibits the growth of spoilage agents. Proteinaceous bacteriocins are produced by several LAB strains and provide an additional hurdle for spoilage and pathogenic microorganisms. Furthermore, lactic acid and other metabolic products contribute to the organoleptic and textural profile of a food item. The industrial importance of the LAB is further evidenced by their generally recognized as safe (GRAS) status, due to their ubiquitous appearance in food and their contribution to the healthy microbiota of animal and human mucosal surfaces.

The genera that comprise the LAB are at its core Lactobacillus, Leuconostoc, Pediococcus, Lactococcus, and Streptococcus, as well as the more peripheral Aerococcus, Carnobacterium, Enterococcus, Oenococcus, Sporolactobacillus, Tetragenococcus, Vagococcus, and Weissella. All but Sporolactobacillus are members of the Lactobacillales order, and all are members of the Bacillota phylum.

Although lactic acid bacteria are generally associated with the order Lactobacillales, bacteria of the genus Bifidobacterium (phylum Actinomycetota) also produce lactic acid as the major product of carbohydrate metabolism.

== Characteristics ==
The lactic acid bacteria (LAB) are either rod-shaped (bacilli), or spherical (cocci), and are characterized by an increased tolerance to acidity (low pH range). This aspect helps LAB to outcompete other bacteria in a natural fermentation, as they can withstand the increased acidity from organic acid production (e.g., lactic acid). Laboratory media used for LAB typically include a carbohydrate source, as most species are incapable of respiration. LAB are catalase-negative. LAB are amongst the most important groups of microorganisms used in the food industry. Their relative simple metabolism has also prompted their use as microbial cell factories for the production of several commodities for the food and non-food sectors

== Metabolism ==
LAB genera are classified in terms of two main pathways of hexose fermentation:

1. Under conditions of excess glucose and limited oxygen, homolactic LAB catabolize one mole of glucose in the Embden-Meyerhof-Parnas pathway to yield two moles of pyruvate. Intracellular redox balance is maintained through the oxidation of NADH, concomitant with pyruvate reduction to lactic acid. This process yields two moles of ATP per mole of glucose consumed. Representative homolactic LAB genera include Lactococcus, Enterococcus, Streptococcus, Pediococcus, and group I lactobacilli
2. Heterofermentative LAB use the pentose phosphate pathway, alternatively referred to as the pentose phosphoketolase pathway. One mole of glucose-6-phosphate is initially dehydrogenated to 6-phosphogluconate and subsequently decarboxylated to yield one mole of CO_{2}. The resulting pentose-5-phosphate is cleaved into one mole glyceraldehyde phosphate (GAP) and one mole acetyl phosphate. GAP is further metabolized to lactate as in homofermentation, with the acetyl phosphate reduced to ethanol via acetyl-CoA and acetaldehyde intermediates. In theory, end products (including ATP) are produced in equimolar quantities from the catabolism of one mole of glucose. Obligate heterofermentative LAB include Leuconostoc, Oenococcus, Weissella, and group III lactobacilli

Some members of Lactobacillus appear also able to perform aerobic respiration, making them facultative anaerobes, unlike the other members of the order, which are all aerotolerant. Using oxygen helps these bacteria deal with stress.

== Streptococcus reclassification ==
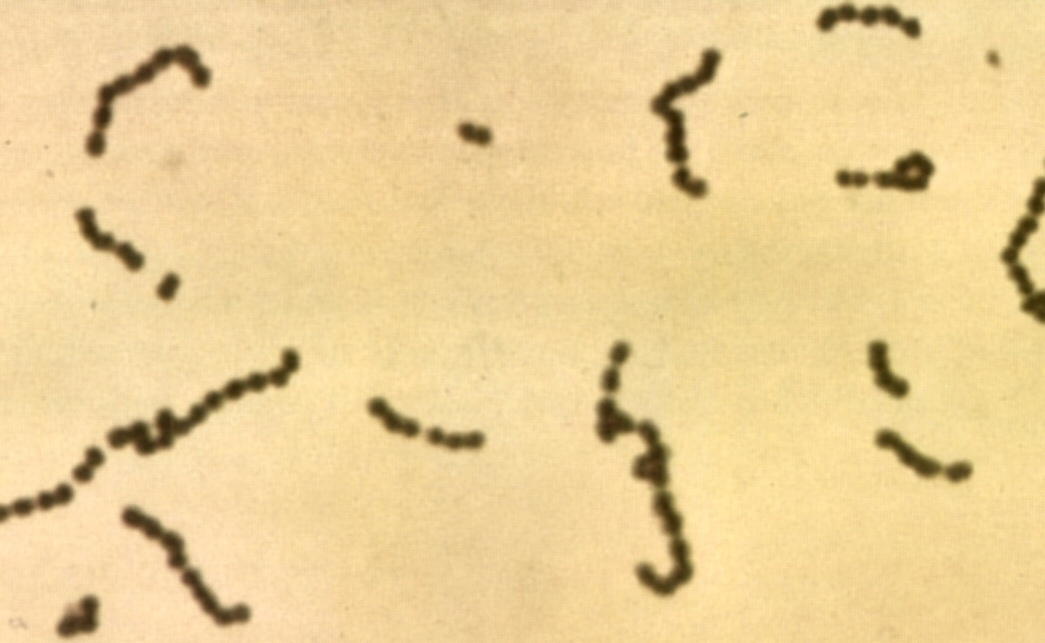
Streptococcus

In 1985, members of the diverse genus Streptococcus were reclassified into Lactococcus, Enterococcus, Vagococcus, and Streptococcus based on biochemical characteristics, as well as molecular features. Formerly, streptococci were segregated primarily based on serology, which has proven to correlate well with the current taxonomic definitions. Lactococci (formerly Lancefield group N streptococci) are used extensively as fermentation starters in dairy production, with humans estimated to consume 10^{18} (one billion billion) lactococci annually. Partly due to their industrial relevance, both L. lactis subspecies (L. l. lactis and L. l. cremoris) are widely used as generic LAB models for research. L. lactis ssp. cremoris, used in the production of hard cheeses, is represented by the laboratory strains LM0230 and MG1363. In similar manner, L. lactis ssp. lactis is employed in soft cheese fermentations, with the workhorse strain IL1403 ubiquitous in LAB research laboratories. In 2001, Bolotin et al. sequenced the genome of IL1403, which coincided with a significant shift of resources to understanding LAB genomics and related applications.

== Phylogeny ==
The currently accepted taxonomy is based on the List of Prokaryotic names with Standing in Nomenclature (LPSN) and National Center for Biotechnology Information (NCBI).

16S rRNA based LTP_10_2024

- Lactobacillales
  - Aerococcaceae
  - - Aerococcaceae~
    - - Aerococcaceae~
      - - Carnobacteriaceae~1
        - - Carnobacteriaceae~2
          - - Carnobacteriaceae
            - - - Vagococcaceae
                - - Catellicoccaceae
                  - - Enterococcaceae
                    - - Enterococcus nangangensis
                      - - Pilibacter
                        - Streptococcaceae
              - - Leuconostocaceae
                - Lactobacillaceae

120 marker proteins based GTDB 09-RS220

- Lactobacillales
  - Listeriaceae
  - - - Carnobacteriaceae
      - Aerococcaceae
    - - - - Catellicoccaceae
          - - Vagococcaceae
            - Enterococcaceae
        - Streptococcaceae
      - Lactobacillaceae

== Uses ==
=== Fermentation ===
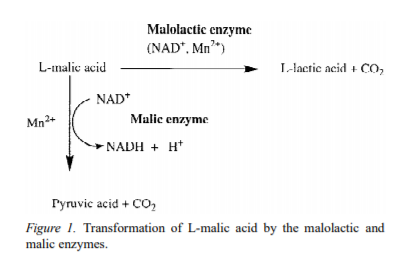

Lactic acid bacteria are used in the food industry for a variety of reasons such as the production of cheese and yogurt products. Popular drinks such as kombucha are made using lactic acid bacteria, with kombucha having been known to have traces of Lactobacillus and Pediococcus once the drink is made.

The beer and wine-making process utilizes certain lactic acid bacteria, mostly Lactobacillus. Lactic acid bacteria is used to start the wine-making process by starting the malolactic fermentation. After the malolactic fermentation, yeast cells are used to start the alcoholic fermentation process in grapes. The malolactic fermentation mechanism is mainly transformation of L-malic acid (dicarboxylic acid) to an lactic acid (monocarboxylic acid). This change occurs due to the presence of malolactic and malic enzymes. All malic acid are degraded and this increase the pH levels which changes the taste of the wine. Not only do they start the process but they are responsible for the different aromas produced in wine by the nutrients presence and the quality of the grapes. Also, the presence of different strains can change the desirability of aromas' presence. The different availability of enzymes that contribute to the vast spectrum of aromas in wine are associated with glycosidases, β-glucosidases, esterases, phenolic acid decarboxylases and citrate lyases.

By using molecular biology, researchers can help pick out different desirable strains that help improve the quality of wine and help with the removable of the undesirable strains. The same can be said about brewing beer as well which uses yeast with some breweries using lactic acid bacteria to change the taste of their beer.

=== Probiotics ===
Probiotics are products aimed at delivering living, potentially beneficial, bacterial cells to the gut ecosystem of humans and other animals, whereas prebiotics are indigestible carbohydrates delivered in food to the large bowel to provide fermentable substrates for selected bacteria. Most strains used as probiotics belong to the genus Lactobacillus. (Other probiotic strains used belong to the genus Bifidobacterium.)

Probiotics have been evaluated in research studies in animals and humans with respect to antibiotic-associated diarrhea, travellers' diarrhea, pediatric diarrhea, inflammatory bowel disease, irritable bowel syndrome and Alzheimer's disease. Future applications of probiotics have been conjectured to include delivery systems for vaccines and immunoglobulins, and the treatment of different gastrointestinal diseases and vaginosis.

=== Foods ===
The quest to find food ingredients with valuable bioactive properties has encouraged interest in exopolysaccharides from LAB. Functional food products that offer health and sensory benefits beyond their nutritional composition are becoming progressively more important to the food industry. The sensory benefits of exopolysaccharides are well established, and there is evidence for the health properties that are attributable to exopolysaccharides from LAB. However, there is a wide variation in molecular structures of exopolysaccharides and the complexity of the mechanisms by which physical changes in foods and bioactive effects are elicited.

Some LAB produce bacteriocins which limit pathogens by interfering with cell wall synthesis or causing pore formation in the cell membrane. Nisin, a bacteriocin produced by LAB, was first researched as a food preservative in 1951 and has since been widely commercially used in foods due to its antimicrobial activity against Gram positive bacteria. Nisin is utilized as a food additive in at least 50 countries. In addition to having antibacterial activity, LAB can inhibit fungal growth. Various LAB, largely from genus Lactococcus and Lactobacillus, suppress mycotoxigenic mold growth due to the production of anti-fungal metabolites. Furthermore, LAB have the potential to reduce the abundance of mycotoxins in foods by binding to them. In a study for postharvest food product safety conducted with 119 LAB isolated from the rhizosphere of olive trees and desert truffles, mostly within the genera of Enterococcus and Weissella, researchers found strong antibacterial activity against Stenotrophomonas maltophilia, Pantoea agglomerans, Pseudomonas savastanoi, Staphylococcus aureus and Listeria monocytogenes, and anti-fungal activity against Botrytis cinerea, Penicillium expansum, Verticillium dahliae and Aspergillus niger.

=== Fertilizer ===
Researchers have studied the impact of lactic acid bacteria on indoleacetic acid production, phosphate solubilization, and nitrogen fixation on citrus. While most of the bacterial isolates were able to produce IAA, phosphate-solubilization was limited to only one of the eight LAB isolates.

=== One Health and cross-domain applications ===
In addition to their established roles in food fermentation and clinical probiotics, lactic acid bacteria are increasingly investigated for agricultural and environmental applications. Several studies reported that LAB strains can bind and remove heavy metals from aqueous and food matrices, suggesting potential roles in bioremediation and decontamination of contaminated waters and foodstuffs. Laboratory studies also indicate that some Lactobacillus strains can adsorb micro- and nanoplastic particles and reduce plastic-induced effects in controlled model systems, pointing to a possible role in microplastic mitigation strategies under specific conditions. Building on these lines of evidence, recent conceptual syntheses propose a One Health or "multi-domain probiotic" framing that positions selected LAB strains as cross-domain agents linking soil health, plant productivity, food safety, and human well-being. However, reported effects are strain-dependent, and further interdisciplinary research is needed to confirm efficacy and safety in complex ecological settings.

== Management of bacteriophages in industry ==
A broad number of food products, commodity chemicals, and biotechnology products are manufactured industrially by large-scale bacterial fermentation of various organic substrates. Because this involves cultivating enormous quantities of bacteria each day in large fermentation vats, a serious threat in these industries is the risk of contamination by bacteriophages, which can rapidly bring fermentations to a halt and cause economical setbacks. Areas of interest in managing this risk include the sources of phage contamination, measures to control their propagation and dissemination, and biotechnological defense strategies developed to restrain them. In the context of the food fermentation industry, the relationship between bacteriophages and their bacterial hosts is very important. The dairy fermentation industry has openly acknowledged the problem of phage contamination, and has worked for decades with academia and starter-culture manufacturers to develop defence strategies and systems to curtail phages' propagation and evolution.

=== Bacteriophage–host interaction ===
The first contact between an infecting phage and its bacterial host is the phage's attaching to the host cell. This attachment is mediated by the phage's receptor binding protein (RBP), which recognizes and binds to a receptor on the bacterial surface. RBPs are also referred to as host-specificity proteins, host determinants, and antireceptors. A variety of molecules have been suggested to act as host receptors for bacteriophages infecting LAB; among those are polysaccharides and (lipo)teichoic acids, as well as a single-membrane protein. A number of RBPs of LAB phages have been identified by the generation of hybrid phages with altered host ranges. These studies, however, also found additional phage proteins to be important for successful phage infection. Analysis of the crystal structure of several RBPs indicates that these proteins share a common tertiary folding, and support previous indications of the saccharide nature of the host receptor. Gram-positive LAB have a thick peptidoglycan layer, which must be traversed to inject the phage genome into the bacterial cytoplasm. Peptidoglycan-degrading enzymes are expected to facilitate this penetration, and such enzymes have been found as structural elements of a number of LAB phages.

== Lactic acid bacteria and dental plaque ==
LAB are able to synthesize levans from sucrose, and dextrans from glucose. Dextrans, like other glucan, enable bacteria to adhere to the surface of teeth, which in turn can cause tooth decay through the formation of dental plaque and production of lactic acid. While the primary bacteria responsible for tooth decay is Streptococcus mutans, LAB do feature among the other most common oral bacteria that cause decay.

== Lactic acid bacteria genera ==
- Abiotrophia
- Aerococcus
- Carnobacterium
- Enterococcus
- Lactobacillus
- Lactococcus
- Leuconostoc
- Oenococcus
- Pediococcus
- Streptococcus
- Tetragenococcus
- Vagococcus
- Weissella

== See also ==
- Gaffkaemia
- Malolactic fermentation
- Lactic acid fermentation
- Lacto-2 RNA motif
- List of bacterial orders
- List of bacteria genera
- Lacto-3 RNA motif
- Lacto-phage-1 RNA motif
