= Superfood =

Marketing term for food with supposed health benefits

Superfood is a marketing term for food claimed to confer health benefits resulting from an exceptional nutrient density. The term is not commonly used by experts, dietitians and nutrition scientists, most of whom dispute that particular foods have the health benefits claimed by their advocates. Even without scientific evidence of exceptional nutrient content, many new, exotic, and foreign fruits or ancient grains are marketed under the term – or superfruit or supergrain respectively – after being introduced or re-introduced to Western markets.

In 2007, the marketing of products as "superfoods" was prohibited in the European Union unless accompanied by a specific authorized health claim supported by credible scientific research.

== Definition and use of the term ==
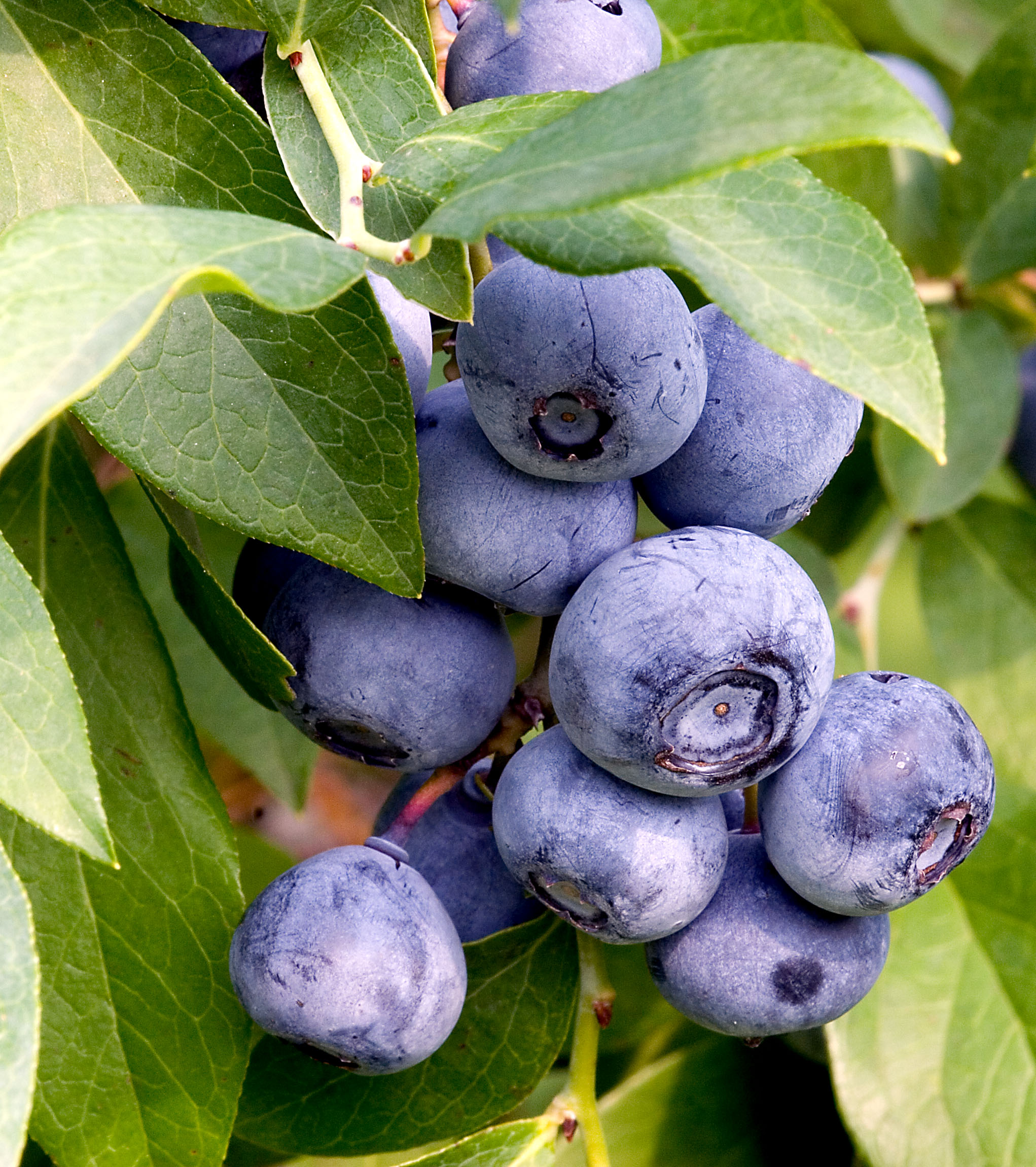
Commonly cited as a superfood, blueberries actually provide moderate levels of nutrients compared to many vegetables and other fruits.

The term has no official definition by regulatory authorities in major consumer markets, such as the United States Food and Drug Administration and Department of Agriculture or the European Food Safety Authority. It appears to have been first used in a Canadian newspaper in 1949 when referring to the supposed nutritional qualities of a muffin. In the late 20th and early 21st centuries, the term "superfood" was used as a marketing tool for selling specific foods, dietary supplements, foods with selected food additives, and self-help books about fad diets, promising an enhancement to health. "Superfood" products were sold at a higher price than similar foods not marketed with the label. The purported health benefits and effects of foods described as superfoods are unsupported or disputed by scientific studies.

As of 2007, the marketing of products as superfoods was prohibited in the European Union unless accompanied by a specific authorized health claim supported by credible scientific research. The ruling was a marketing guide issued to manufacturers to assure scientific proof or evidence why a food would be labeled as extra healthy or classified as a superfood. The European Food Information Council stated that it was impractical for people to have a diet based only on superfoods when nutrients are provided readily from a diet based on a diversity of foods, especially a diet including fruits and vegetables.

According to Cancer Research UK, "the term 'superfood' is really just a marketing tool, with little scientific basis to it". Although superfoods are often promoted as preventing or curing diseases, including cancer, Cancer Research UK cautioned that they "cannot substitute for a generally healthy and balanced diet". According to Catherine Collins, chief dietitian at St George's Hospital in London, the term can be harmful: "There are so many wrong ideas about superfoods that I don't know where best to begin to dismantle the whole concept."

Superfruits are a subset of superfoods as first used in 2004. The designation of a fruit as a superfruit is entirely up to the product manufacturer, as the term is primarily used to create consumer demand.

The Irish Cancer Society has described the use of superfoods as a scam to promote false hope that certain foods can cure cancer.

== Examples ==
The Dutch food safety organization Voedingscentrum ('Nutrition Centre') noted that the health claims marketers used to sell goji berry, hemp seed, chia seed, and wheatgrass were not scientifically proven. The organization warned that people who consumed such foods in large quantities may develop an "impaired, one-sided diet".

Berries remain under research and do not have evidence of providing any health benefits different from other fresh fruits. Specifically, blueberries are not especially nutrient dense (a superfood characteristic); they have moderate content of only three essential nutrients: vitamin C, vitamin K, and manganese.

== History and economics ==
In 2007, the superfoods category was forecast to become a billion-dollar global industry by 2011, with several thousand new superfruit products expected to enter the marketplace. According to Datamonitor, superfruit product launches grew at a rate of 67% (2007–2008), but underwent significant category erosion beginning in 2011, when introductions of food and nonfood products featuring pomegranate, açaí or goji declined by 56% (2011–2012 vs. 2009–2010).

More than a dozen industry publications on functional foods and beverages have referred to various exotic species as superfruits, with estimates for some 10,000 new product introductions in 2007–2008. Relatively rare fruits originating from Oceania (noni), China (goji, seabuckthorn), Southeast Asia (mangosteen), or tropical South America (açaí) and unknown to American consumers were among the first wave of superfruits successfully used in product manufacturing from 2005 to 2010.

The company Tahitian Noni began selling noni juice in 1996 and achieved billions of dollars in sales during their first 10 years. Earlier reports showed pomegranate-based products grew nearly 400% over 2005–2007 from new product launches, a gain that exceeded the previous six years. Similarly, sales of XanGo, a multiple-fruit juice containing mangosteen juice, grew from $40 million in 2002 to $200 million in 2005.

Manufacturers may use some fruits to enhance the flavor of food products in an attempt to mask other tastes or provide impressions of novelty and health. Five thousand new products were introduced in 2005 based on berries alone. The superfruit category was one of the top 10 global trends in consumer products in 2008.

Over the years 2011 to 2015, the number of food or beverage products containing the words "superfood", "superfruit" or "supergrain" doubled. Grains such as quinoa, barley, spelt, and millet are marketed as "heritage" or "ancient" superfoods because they have been consumed over centuries, are perceived as a whole food, and require minimal processing.

== See also ==
- Diet-based cancer treatments that are unproven
- Fad diet
- Functional food
