= Granulicatella adiacens =

Scientific classification
- Domain: Bacteria
- Kingdom: Bacillati
- Phylum: Bacillota
- Class: Bacilli
- Order: Lactobacillales
- Family: Carnobacteriaceae
- Genus: Granulicatella
- Species: G. adiacens

Binomial name
- Granulicatella adiacens Collins & Lawson, 2000

Bacteria

Granulicatella adiacens is a fastidious Gram-positive cocci (pairs, chains) and is part of the nutritionally variant streptococci (NVS). Like other constituents of the NVS, it can cause bacteremia and infective endocarditis (IE), with significant morbidity and mortality. NVS has less often been implicated in a variety of other infections, including those of the orbit, nasolacrimal duct and breast implants. It is a commensal of the human mouth, genital, and intestinal tracts, although it is rarely implicated in infections, in part due to it being a fastidious organism and rarely being identified in the laboratory environment. However, its identification has become more frequent with use of commercial mediums and automated identification systems. Because it has been difficult to identify, it has been considered one of the causes of culture negative IE. Identifying G. adiacens can allow more appropriate selection of antibiotics, especially when susceptibility testing is not available.

== Clinical relevance ==
Granulicatella adiacens susceptibility in California
Antibiotic	Susceptible (%)
Penicillin	38.9
Cefotaxime	18.9
Ceftriaxone	43.3
Erythromycin	52.2
Levofloxacin	84.5
Clindamycin	91.9
Meropenem	100
Vancomycin	100

=== Infective endocarditis ===
Of human diseases caused by G. adiacens, infective endocarditis (IE) is the most common. Among the members of the genus Granulicatella, G. adiacens seems to be more capable of causing IE, possibly due to its capacity to bind to the cardiac valvular tissue. IE from NVS species has been described as indolent-onset, often in the setting of preexisting heart valve damage. The aortic and mitral valves are most commonly affected. More often than not, IE due to NVS produces detectable vegetations, although other classic IE signs (e.g., Osler nodes) are usually not present. Treatment failure is frequently observed, and approximately 1/4 of cases require prosthetic valve replacement.

=== Antibiotic treatment ===
The Granulicatella genus is more resistant to antibiotics than viridans streptococci (another common cause of IE), although it is still often susceptible to clindamycin, erythromycin, rifampicin and vancomycin.

=== Malodorous breath ===
Granulicatella spp. have been associated with malodorous breath (halitosis) in Japan.

== Laboratory identification ==
It grows best on media supplemented with thiol or pyridoxal. Phenotypic identification of this genus is difficult, but feasible with automated identification systems. 16S rRNA gene sequencing is confirmatory.

== Classification history ==
In 1961, a new type of viridans streptococci was classified as "nutritionally variant streptococci" (NVS). In 1989, NVS was subdivided into Streptococcus defectiva and Streptococcus adiacens, which in 1995 were relocated to create a new genus Abiotrophia. In 2000, three members of the Abiotrophia genus were reclassified into the genus Granulicatella (Granulicatella adiacens, balaenopterae and elegans).
