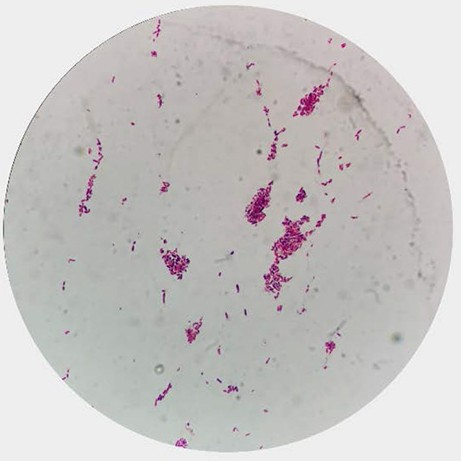
- Bacterial smear

Scientific classification
- Domain: Bacteria
- Kingdom: Bacillati
- Phylum: Bacillota
- Class: Bacilli
- Order: Lactobacillales
- Family: Aerococcaceae
- Genus: Abiotrophia
- Species: A. defectiva

Binomial name
- Abiotrophia defectiva (Bouvet et al. 1989) Kawamura et al. 1995

Type strain
- GIFU 12707

Synonyms
- Streptococcus defectivus Bouvet et al. 1989

= Abiotrophia defectiva =

Species of bacteria

Abiotrophia defectiva is a Gram-positive, facultative anaerobic, pleomorphic, usually commensal, bacterium of the genus Abiotrophia most commonly found in the oral microbiota, colonising early dental plaque. Other locations for A. defectiva consist of the gastrointestinal and genitourinary tracts. Despite typically being commensal, it has been identified as a possible cause of culture-negative infective endocarditis, dental caries and bacteremia.

== Taxonomy and classification ==
When discovered, A. defectiva was initially known as a nutritionally variant streptococci (NVS), and due to its poor adherence to a standard shape, there was difficulty in classifying it to a genus. It was later classified a member of the genus Streptococcus under the name Streptococcus defectivus. It was classified under this genus due to morphological and biochemical factors such as their chain-forming cocci, an absence of catalase activity and their growth and gas production behaviour in different broth environments. Low DNA relatedness between A. defectiva and the type and reference strains of Streptococcus distinguished it as a separate species rather than a strain.

In 1995, it was reclassified under its current name Abiotrophia defectiva due to its low phylogenetic similarity to other Streptococcus species with the closest related being Streptococcus hyointestinalis with a homology level of 89.2%, which led to its reclassification to its own new genus, Abiotrophia. It is the only species classified under its genus, and is the type species.

== Morphology ==
Abiotrophia defectiva is typically coccus-shaped. However, due to its pleomorphism, can morph into other shapes, such as ovoid (0.40–0.55 μm), coccobacilli or rod-shaped cells depending on growth conditions. It can appear alone, in pairs, or form chains of variable length. As a NVS, A. defectiva had thicker cell walls and improper septation.

On a Gram stain, A. defectiva most commonly appears as Gram-positive, however, in certain growing conditions can stain Gram-variable, most commonly in low-nutrient environments.

As A. defectiva is non-motile, it lacks any external structures that aid movement such as flagella.

== Physiology ==
Abiotrophia defectiva is a fastidious organism, and requires complex living conditions in order to grow. Being facultative anaerobic, it requires an atmosphere of 5–10% CO₂ to grow optimally. In laboratory conditions, it requires a medium supplemented with pyridoxal or cysteine to support its growth, as it requires the pyridoxal in human blood to support itself.

If the required nutrients are not present in order for the bacterium to support itself, it will attempt to form satellite colonies with other species that can supply required nutrients, such as Staphylococcus aureus.

Abiotrophia defectiva is both catalase-negative and oxidase-negative, and produces lactic acid.

== Clinical significance ==
=== Pathogenicity ===
Abiotrophia defectiva is an opportunistic bacterium that has links to a wide variety of bloodstream-related diseases, As it is found in the oral cavity, people with recent dental procedures or poor dental hygiene are at a higher risk of infection via entry into the bloodstream from the mouth. Twenty-seven putative virulence factors have been identified.

=== Linked diseases ===
Abiotrophia defectiva has been most significantly linked to culture-negative infective endocarditis, related to approximately 1–2% of cases. Due to its fastidious nature, it is difficult to diagnose early, and is resistant to common antibiotics. It has a mortality rate of 17% which is higher than other bacteria that can cause the infection. It can lead to other complications such as septic embolisation, cerebral abscess, mycotic aneurysm, endophthalmitis and other infection-related diseases.

It is also a cause of bacteraemia, a bloodstream infection in which A. defectiva typically gains access via the oral cavity. Bacteraemia from A. defectiva can lead to other more severe diseases such as infective endocarditis.

While less common, there have also been reported cases of A. defectiva being a cause of postkeratoplasty keratitis, brain infarction, subarachnoid haemorrhage, native vertebral osteomyelitis, and septic arthritis. There have also been rare cases of peritonitis, and prosthetic joint infection.
