= Facklamia hominis =

Scientific classification
- Domain: Bacteria
- Kingdom: Bacillati
- Phylum: Bacillota
- Class: Bacilli
- Order: Lactobacillales
- Family: Aerococcaceae
- Genus: Facklamia
- Species: F. hominis

Binomial name
- Facklamia hominis Collins et al. 1997

Type strain
- ATCC 700628, CCUG 36813, CIP 105962, LMG 18980

Species of bacterium

Facklamia hominis is a Gram-positive and anaerobic bacterium from the family of Facklamia which has been isolated from humans. The genus Facklamia was first described in 1997 using 16S rRNA sequencing and has since been identified from both a wide range of animal sources and infrequently as a human pathogen.
