= Facklamia languida =

Scientific classification
- Domain: Bacteria
- Kingdom: Bacillati
- Phylum: Bacillota
- Class: Bacilli
- Order: Lactobacillales
- Family: Aerococcaceae
- Genus: Facklamia
- Species: F. languida

Binomial name
- Facklamia languida Lawson et al. 1999

Type strain
- CCUG 37842, CIP 105964, LMG 19532

Species of bacterium

Facklamia languida is a Gram-positive bacteria from the family of Facklamia which has been isolated from humans.
