= Desemzia incerta =

Scientific classification
- Domain: Bacteria
- Kingdom: Bacillati
- Phylum: Bacillota
- Class: Bacilli
- Order: Lactobacillales
- Family: Carnobacteriaceae
- Genus: Desemzia
- Species: D. incerta

Binomial name
- Desemzia incerta (Steinhaus 1941) Stackebrandt et al. 1999

Type strain
- ATCC 8363, DSM 20581 9

Synonyms
- Bacterium incertum, Brevibacterium incertum

Species of bacterium

Desemzia incerta is a bacterium from the genus of Desemzia which has been isolated from the ovaries of the cicada Tibicen linnei.
