= Trichococcus collinsii =

Scientific classification
- Domain: Bacteria
- Kingdom: Bacillati
- Phylum: Bacillota
- Class: Bacilli
- Order: Lactobacillales
- Family: Carnobacteriaceae
- Genus: Trichococcus
- Species: T. collinsii

Binomial name
- Trichococcus collinsii Liu et al. 2002

Type strain
- 37AN3

Species of bacterium

Trichococcus collinsii is a bacterium from the genus Trichococcus.
