= Pyridoxine 4-oxidase =

pyridoxine 4-oxidase

Identifiers
- EC no.: 1.1.3.12
- CAS no.: 37250-82-1

Databases
- BRENDA: enzyme data
- ExPASy: NiceZyme view
- KEGG: enzyme entry
- MetaCyc: metabolic pathway
- Rhea: reactions
- PDB structures: RCSB PDB PDBe PDBsum
- Gene Ontology: AmiGO / QuickGO
Search
- PMC: articles
- PubMed: articles
- NCBI: proteins

In enzymology, pyridoxine 4-oxidase (EC 1.1.3.12) is an enzyme that catalyzes the chemical reaction

pyridoxine
O_{2}
H_{2}O_{2}
O_{2}
H_{2}O_{2}
pyridoxal

The two substrates of this enzyme are pyridoxine and oxygen. Its products are pyridoxal and hydrogen peroxide.

This enzyme belongs to the family of oxidoreductases, specifically those acting on the CH-OH group of donor with oxygen as acceptor. The systematic name of this enzyme class is pyridoxine:oxygen 4-oxidoreductase. Other names in common use include pyridoxin 4-oxidase, and pyridoxol 4-oxidase. This enzyme participates in vitamin B_{6} metabolism. It employs one cofactor, FAD.
