= Pyridoxine 4-dehydrogenase =

pyridoxine 4-dehydrogenase

Identifiers
- EC no.: 1.1.1.65
- CAS no.: 9028-64-2

Databases
- IntEnz: IntEnz view
- BRENDA: BRENDA entry
- ExPASy: NiceZyme view
- KEGG: KEGG entry
- MetaCyc: metabolic pathway
- PRIAM: profile
- PDB structures: RCSB PDB PDBe PDBsum
- Gene Ontology: AmiGO / QuickGO
Search
- PMC: articles
- PubMed: articles
- NCBI: proteins

In enzymology, pyridoxine 4-dehydrogenase (EC 1.1.1.65) is an enzyme that catalyzes the chemical reaction

Pyridoxine
+ NADP^{+}
H^{+}
H^{+}
Pyridoxal
+ NADPH

The two substrates of this enzyme are pyridoxine and oxidised nicotinamide adenine dinucleotide phosphate (NADP^{+}). Its products are pyridoxal, reduced NADPH, and a proton.

This enzyme belongs to the family of oxidoreductases, specifically those acting on the CH-OH group of donors with NAD^{+} or NADP^{+} as acceptors. The systematic name of this enzyme class is pyridoxine:NADP^{+} 4-oxidoreductase. Other names in common use include pyridoxin dehydrogenase, pyridoxol dehydrogenase, and pyridoxine dehydrogenase. This enzyme participates in vitamin B_{6} metabolism.
