= Facklamia ignava =

Scientific classification
- Domain: Bacteria
- Kingdom: Bacillati
- Phylum: Bacillota
- Class: Bacilli
- Order: Lactobacillales
- Family: Aerococcaceae
- Genus: Facklamia
- Species: F. ignava

Binomial name
- Facklamia ignava Collins et al. 1998

Type strain
- ATCC 700631, CCUG 37419, CIP 105583, LMG 18981, strain 164-97

Species of bacterium

Facklamia ignava is a Gram-positive bacteria from the family of Facklamia which has been isolated from humans.
