= Alkalibacterium iburiense =

Scientific classification
- Domain: Bacteria
- Kingdom: Bacillati
- Phylum: Bacillota
- Class: Bacilli
- Order: Lactobacillales
- Family: Carnobacteriaceae
- Genus: Alkalibacterium
- Species: A. iburiense

Binomial name
- Alkalibacterium iburiense Nakajima et al. 2005

Type strain
- M3

Synonyms
- Alkalibacterium iburiensis

Species of bacterium

Alkalibacterium iburiense is a Gram-positive, obligately alkaliphilic, indigo-reducing, facultatively anaerobic and straight rod-shaped bacterium from the genus Alkalibacterium.
