= Granulicatella balaenopterae =

Scientific classification
- Domain: Bacteria
- Kingdom: Bacillati
- Phylum: Bacillota
- Class: Bacilli
- Order: Lactobacillales
- Family: Carnobacteriaceae
- Genus: Granulicatella
- Species: G. balaenopterae

Binomial name
- Granulicatella balaenopterae Lawson and Collins, 2000

Type strain
- CCUG 37380T

Synonyms
- Abiotrophia balaenopterae

Species of bacterium

Granulicatella balaenopterae (Basonym: Abiotrophia balaenopterae) is a bacterium from the genus Granulicatella which has been isolated from the lung of a beached common minke whale.

In 2000, following rRNA gene sequencing from Lawson and Collins, Granulicatella balaenopterae was reclassified from its previous genus, Abiotrophia, to Granulicatella.
