= Facklamia tabacinasalis =

Scientific classification
- Domain: Bacteria
- Kingdom: Bacillati
- Phylum: Bacillota
- Class: Bacilli
- Order: Lactobacillales
- Family: Aerococcaceae
- Genus: Facklamia
- Species: F. tabacinasalis

Binomial name
- Facklamia tabacinasalis Collins et al. 1999

Type strain
- ATCC 700838, CCUG 30090, CIP 106117

Species of Gram-positive bacterium

Facklamia tabacinasalis is a Gram-positive bacteria from the family of Facklamia which has been isolated from powdered tobacco.
