= Alkalibacterium indicireducens =

Scientific classification
- Domain: Bacteria
- Kingdom: Bacillati
- Phylum: Bacillota
- Class: Bacilli
- Order: Lactobacillales
- Family: Carnobacteriaceae
- Genus: Alkalibacterium
- Species: A. indicireducens

Binomial name
- Alkalibacterium indicireducens Yumoto et al. 2008

Type strain
- A11

Synonyms
- Alkalibacterium polygonumreducens

Species of bacterium

Alkalibacterium indicireducens is a Gram-positive, obligately alkaliphilic, facultatively anaerobic and rod-shaped bacterium from the genus Alkalibacterium.
