= Facklamia miroungae =

Scientific classification
- Domain: Bacteria
- Kingdom: Bacillati
- Phylum: Bacillota
- Class: Bacilli
- Order: Lactobacillales
- Family: Aerococcaceae
- Genus: Facklamia
- Species: F. miroungae

Binomial name
- Facklamia miroungae Hoyles et al. 2001

Type strain
- CCUG 42728, CIP 106764, CCUG42728, A/G13/99/2

Species of Gram-positive bacterium

Facklamia miroungae is a Gram-positive and facultatively anaerobic bacteria from the family of Facklamia which has been isolated from the nasal cavity of a southern elephant seal (Mirounga leonina).
