= Jeotgalibaca ciconiae =

Scientific classification
- Domain: Bacteria
- Kingdom: Bacillati
- Phylum: Bacillota
- Class: Bacilli
- Order: Lactobacillales
- Family: Carnobacteriaceae
- Genus: Jeotgalibaca
- Species: J. ciconiae

Binomial name
- Jeotgalibaca ciconiae Lee et al. 2020

Type strain
- H21T32

Species of bacterium

Jeotgalibaca ciconiae is a Gram-positive, facultatively anaerobic and non-spore-forming bacterium from the genus Jeotgalibaca which has been isolated from the faeces of an oriental stork (Ciconia boyciana).
