= Granulicatella elegans =

Scientific classification
- Domain: Bacteria
- Kingdom: Bacillati
- Phylum: Bacillota
- Class: Bacilli
- Order: Lactobacillales
- Family: Carnobacteriaceae
- Genus: Granulicatella
- Species: G. elegans

Binomial name
- Granulicatella elegans (Roggenkamp et al. 1999) Collins and Lawson 2000

Synonyms
- Abiotropha elegans

Species of bacteria

Granulicatella elegans is a species of bacteria known to reside in humans, occasionally acting as an opportunistic pathogen.

== Discovery and taxonomy ==
Granulicatella elegans was first isolated from the blood of a hospital patient suffering from acute endocarditis in Munich, Germany. It was first described under the name Abiotropha elegans. It was later moved to the new genus Granulicatella along with other species of Abiotropha upon the discovery that Abiotropha was polyphyletic. Its species name elegans refers to its fastidious growth requirements.

== Description ==
Granulicatella elegans is gram-positive, non-motile, and facultatively anaerobic. Its shape differs based on its nutritional state, appearing as coccoid-shaped cells in short chains when grown in nutritionally sufficient media. It is both catalase-negative and oxidase-negative. Growth has been observed at 27-37°C but not at 20°C or 42°C. Very small colonies are known to grow on Schaedler-sheep blood agar. It is capable of fermenting raffinose.

== Pathogenicity ==
While Granulicatella elegans can exist as part of the normal flora of the human mouth, as well as rarely of the flora of the vagina, it has also been implicated in disease such as infective endocarditis. Transmission of G. elegans from the oral cavity to the bloodstream is thought to be a possible cause of infection.

Many G. elegans isolates have been found to be resistant to the antibiotic erythromycin.
