= Alloiococcus otitis =

Scientific classification
- Domain: Bacteria
- Kingdom: Bacillati
- Phylum: Bacillota
- Class: Bacilli
- Order: Lactobacillales
- Family: Carnobacteriaceae
- Genus: Alloiococcus
- Species: A. otitis

Binomial name
- Alloiococcus otitis Aguirre and Collins 1992

Species of bacterium

Alloiococcus otitis is a species of bacteria first isolated from human middle-ear fluid, the type species of its monotypic genus. The type strain is NCFB 2890.
