= Atopostipes suicloacalis =

Scientific classification
- Domain: Bacteria
- Kingdom: Bacillati
- Phylum: Bacillota
- Class: Bacilli
- Order: Lactobacillales
- Family: Carnobacteriaceae
- Genus: Atopostipes
- Species: A. suicloacalis

Binomial name
- Atopostipes suicloacalis Cotta et al. 2004

Type strain
- DSM 15692, NRRL 23919, PPC79

Synonyms
- Atopostipes suicloacale

Species of bacterium

Atopostipes suicloacalis is a rod-shaped and non-spore-forming bacterium from the genus of Atopostipes which has been isolated from a swine manure storage pit in the United States.
