= Alkalibacterium kapii =

Scientific classification
- Domain: Bacteria
- Kingdom: Bacillati
- Phylum: Bacillota
- Class: Bacilli
- Order: Lactobacillales
- Family: Carnobacteriaceae
- Genus: Alkalibacterium
- Species: A. kapii

Binomial name
- Alkalibacterium kapii Ishikawa et al. 2009

Species of bacterium

Alkalibacterium kapii is a Gram-positive and non-spore-forming bacterium from the genus Alkalibacterium which has been isolated from ka-pi (fermented Shrimp paste).
