= Allofustis seminis =

Scientific classification
- Domain: Bacteria
- Kingdom: Bacillati
- Phylum: Bacillota
- Class: Bacilli
- Order: Lactobacillales
- Family: Carnobacteriaceae
- Genus: Allofustis
- Species: A. seminis

Binomial name
- Allofustis seminis Collins et al. 2003

Type strain
- CCUG 45438, CCUG 45438, CIP 107425, DSM 15817

Species of bacterium

Allofustis seminis is a Gram-positive, facultatively anaerobic, rod-shaped and non-spore-forming bacterium from the genus of Allofustis which has been isolated from pig semen in Canada.
