= Trichococcus ilyis =

Scientific classification
- Domain: Bacteria
- Kingdom: Bacillati
- Phylum: Bacillota
- Class: Bacilli
- Order: Lactobacillales
- Family: Carnobacteriaceae
- Genus: Trichococcus
- Species: T. ilyis

Binomial name
- Trichococcus ilyis Strepis et al. 2016

Type strain
- R210

Species of bacterium

Trichococcus ilyis is a bacterium from the genus Trichococcus which has been isolated from sludge from an anaerobic sulfate-reducing bioreactor from Jiangsu.
