= Eremococcus coleocola =

Scientific classification
- Domain: Bacteria
- Kingdom: Bacillati
- Phylum: Bacillota
- Class: Bacilli
- Order: Lactobacillales
- Family: Aerococcaceae
- Genus: Eremococcus
- Species: E. coleocola

Binomial name
- Eremococcus coleocola Collins et al. 1999

Type strain
- ATCC BAA-57, CCUG 38207, CIP 106310, DSM 15696, M1832/95/2, M923/98/1

Species of bacterium

Eremococcus coleocola is a Gram-positive and facultatively anaerobic bacteria from the family of Eremococcus which has been isolated from the reproductive tract of horses in England.
