= Pyridoxal oxidase =

Class of enzymes

pyridoxal oxidase

Identifiers
- EC no.: 1.2.3.8
- CAS no.: 76415-81-1

Databases
- IntEnz: IntEnz view
- BRENDA: BRENDA entry
- ExPASy: NiceZyme view
- KEGG: KEGG entry
- MetaCyc: metabolic pathway
- PRIAM: profile
- PDB structures: RCSB PDB PDBe PDBsum
- Gene Ontology: AmiGO / QuickGO
Search
- PMC: articles
- PubMed: articles
- NCBI: proteins

In enzymology, pyridoxal oxidase (EC 1.2.3.8) is an enzyme that catalyzes the chemical reaction

pyridoxal
+ H_{2}O
O_{2}
H_{2}O_{2}
O_{2}
H_{2}O_{2}
4-pyridoxic acid

The three substrates of this enzyme are pyridoxal, water, and oxygen. Its products are 4-pyridoxic acid and hydrogen peroxide.

This enzyme belongs to the family of oxidoreductases, specifically those acting on the aldehyde or oxo group of donor with oxygen as acceptor. The systematic name of this enzyme class is pyridoxal:oxygen 4-oxidoreductase. This enzyme participates in vitamin B_{6} metabolism. It employs one cofactor, molybdenum.
