= Alkalibacterium gilvum =

Scientific classification
- Domain: Bacteria
- Kingdom: Bacillati
- Phylum: Bacillota
- Class: Bacilli
- Order: Lactobacillales
- Family: Carnobacteriaceae
- Genus: Alkalibacterium
- Species: A. gilvum

Binomial name
- Alkalibacterium gilvum Ishikawa et al. 2013

Species of bacterium

Alkalibacterium gilvum is a Gram-positive, non-spore-forming, halophilic, alkaliphilic and non-motile bacterium from the genus Alkalibacterium which has been isolated from cheeses from Europe.
