= Trichococcus flocculiformis =

Scientific classification
- Domain: Bacteria
- Kingdom: Bacillati
- Phylum: Bacillota
- Class: Bacilli
- Order: Lactobacillales
- Family: Carnobacteriaceae
- Genus: Trichococcus
- Species: T. flocculiformis

Binomial name
- Trichococcus flocculiformis Scheff et al. 1984

Type strain
- DSM 2094

Species of bacterium

Trichococcus flocculiformis is a Gram-positive bacterium from the genus Trichococcus with a flagellum which has been isolated from sewage sludge from a sewage treatment plant from Echterdingen in Germany.
