= Jeotgalibaca dankookensis =

Scientific classification
- Domain: Bacteria
- Kingdom: Bacillati
- Phylum: Bacillota
- Class: Bacilli
- Order: Lactobacillales
- Family: Carnobacteriaceae
- Genus: Jeotgalibaca
- Species: J. dankookensis

Binomial name
- Jeotgalibaca dankookensis Lee et al. 2014

Type strain
- EX-07

Species of bacterium

Jeotgalibaca dankookensis is a Gram-positive, aerobic, halotolerant and non-motile bacterium from the genus Jeotgalibaca which has been isolated from Saeu-jeot.
