= Jeotgalibaca arthritidis =

Scientific classification
- Domain: Bacteria
- Kingdom: Bacillati
- Phylum: Bacillota
- Class: Bacilli
- Order: Lactobacillales
- Family: Carnobacteriaceae
- Genus: Jeotgalibaca
- Species: J. arthritidis

Binomial name
- Jeotgalibaca arthritidis Zamora et al. 2017

Type strain
- 1805-02

Species of bacterium

Jeotgalibaca arthritidis is a Gram-positive bacterium from the genus Jeotgalibaca which has been isolated from the liquid of a joint from pigs.
