= Pyridoxal 4-dehydrogenase =

pyridoxal 4-dehydrogenase

Identifiers
- EC no.: 1.1.1.107
- CAS no.: 37250-39-8

Databases
- IntEnz: IntEnz view
- BRENDA: BRENDA entry
- ExPASy: NiceZyme view
- KEGG: KEGG entry
- MetaCyc: metabolic pathway
- PRIAM: profile
- PDB structures: RCSB PDB PDBe PDBsum
- Gene Ontology: AmiGO / QuickGO
Search
- PMC: articles
- PubMed: articles
- NCBI: proteins

In enzymology, pyridoxal 4-dehydrogenase (EC 1.1.1.107) is an enzyme that catalyzes the chemical reaction

pyridoxal
+ NAD^{+}
H^{+}
H^{+}
4-pyrixoxolactone
+ NADH

The two substrates of this enzyme are pyridoxal and oxidised nicotinamide adenine dinucleotide (NAD^{+}). Its products are 4-pyridoxolactone, reduced NADH, and a proton.

This enzyme belongs to the family of oxidoreductases, specifically those acting on the CH-OH group of donor with NAD^{+} or NADP^{+} as acceptor. The systematic name of this enzyme class is pyridoxal:NAD^{+} 4-oxidoreductase. This enzyme is also called pyridoxal dehydrogenase. This enzyme participates in vitamin B_{6} metabolism.
