= Carnobacterium pleistocenium =

Scientific classification
- Domain: Bacteria
- Kingdom: Bacillati
- Phylum: Bacillota
- Class: Bacilli
- Order: Lactobacillales
- Family: Carnobacteriaceae
- Genus: Carnobacterium
- Species: C. pleistocenium

Binomial name
- Carnobacterium pleistocenium Pikuta et al. 2005

Species of bacterium

Carnobacterium pleistocenium is a recently discovered Gram-positive bacterium from the arctic part of Alaska. It was found in permafrost, seemingly frozen there for 32,000 years. Melting the ice, however, brought these extremophiles back to life. This is the first case of an organism "coming back to life" from ancient ice. These bacterial cells were discovered in a tunnel dug by the Army Corps of Engineers in the 1960s to allow scientists to study the permafrost in preparation for the construction of the Trans-Alaska pipeline system.

The discovery of this bacterium is of particular interest for NASA, for it may be possible for such life to exist in the permafrost of Mars or on the surface of Europa. It is also of interest for scientists investigating the potential for cryogenically freezing life forms to reduce the transportation costs (in terms of life support systems) that would be associated with long-duration space travel.
