= Marinilactibacillus piezotolerans =

Scientific classification
- Domain: Bacteria
- Kingdom: Bacillati
- Phylum: Bacillota
- Class: Bacilli
- Order: Lactobacillales
- Family: Carnobacteriaceae
- Genus: Marinilactibacillus
- Species: M. piezotolerans

Binomial name
- Marinilactibacillus piezotolerans Toffin et al. 2005

Type strain
- LT20

Species of bacterium

Marinilactibacillus piezotolerans is a Gram-positive, piezotolerant, non-spore-forming, rod-shaped and non-motile bacterium from the genus Marinilactibacillus which has been isolated from deep sub-seafloor sediments from Nankai Trough.
