= Ignavigranum ruoffiae =

Scientific classification
- Domain: Bacteria
- Kingdom: Bacillati
- Phylum: Bacillota
- Class: Bacilli
- Order: Lactobacillales
- Family: Aerococcaceae
- Genus: Ignavigranum
- Species: I. ruoffiae

Binomial name
- Ignavigranum ruoffiae Collins et al. 1999

Type strain
- 1607-97, ATCC 700630, CCUG 37658, CDC 1607-97, CIP 105896, Collins 1607-95, DSM 15695, SS-1483

Species of bacterium

Ignavigranum ruoffiae is a Gram-positive and facultatively anaerobic bacteria from the family of Ignavigranum which has been isolated from a human wound in the United States.
