= Marinilactibacillus psychrotolerans =

Scientific classification
- Domain: Bacteria
- Kingdom: Bacillati
- Phylum: Bacillota
- Class: Bacilli
- Order: Lactobacillales
- Family: Carnobacteriaceae
- Genus: Marinilactibacillus
- Species: M. psychrotolerans

Binomial name
- Marinilactibacillus psychrotolerans Ishikawa et al. 2003

Synonyms
- Marinilactobacillus psychrotolerans

Species of bacterium

Marinilactibacillus psychrotolerans is a Gram-positive, mesophilic, alkaliphilic, slightly halophilic, highly halotolerant, non-spore-forming and motile bacterium from the genus Marinilactibacillus which has been isolated from a sponge from the Oura beach.
