= Alkalibacterium subtropicum =

Scientific classification
- Domain: Bacteria
- Kingdom: Bacillati
- Phylum: Bacillota
- Class: Bacilli
- Order: Lactobacillales
- Family: Carnobacteriaceae
- Genus: Alkalibacterium
- Species: A. subtropicum

Binomial name
- Alkalibacterium subtropicum Ishikawa et al. 2011

Type strain
- O24-2

Synonyms
- Alkalibacterium subtropicalis

Species of bacterium

Alkalibacterium subtropicum is a slightly halophilic and alkaliphilic bacterium from the genus Alkalibacterium.
