= Noni juice =

Juice of the fruit of the species Morinda citrifolia

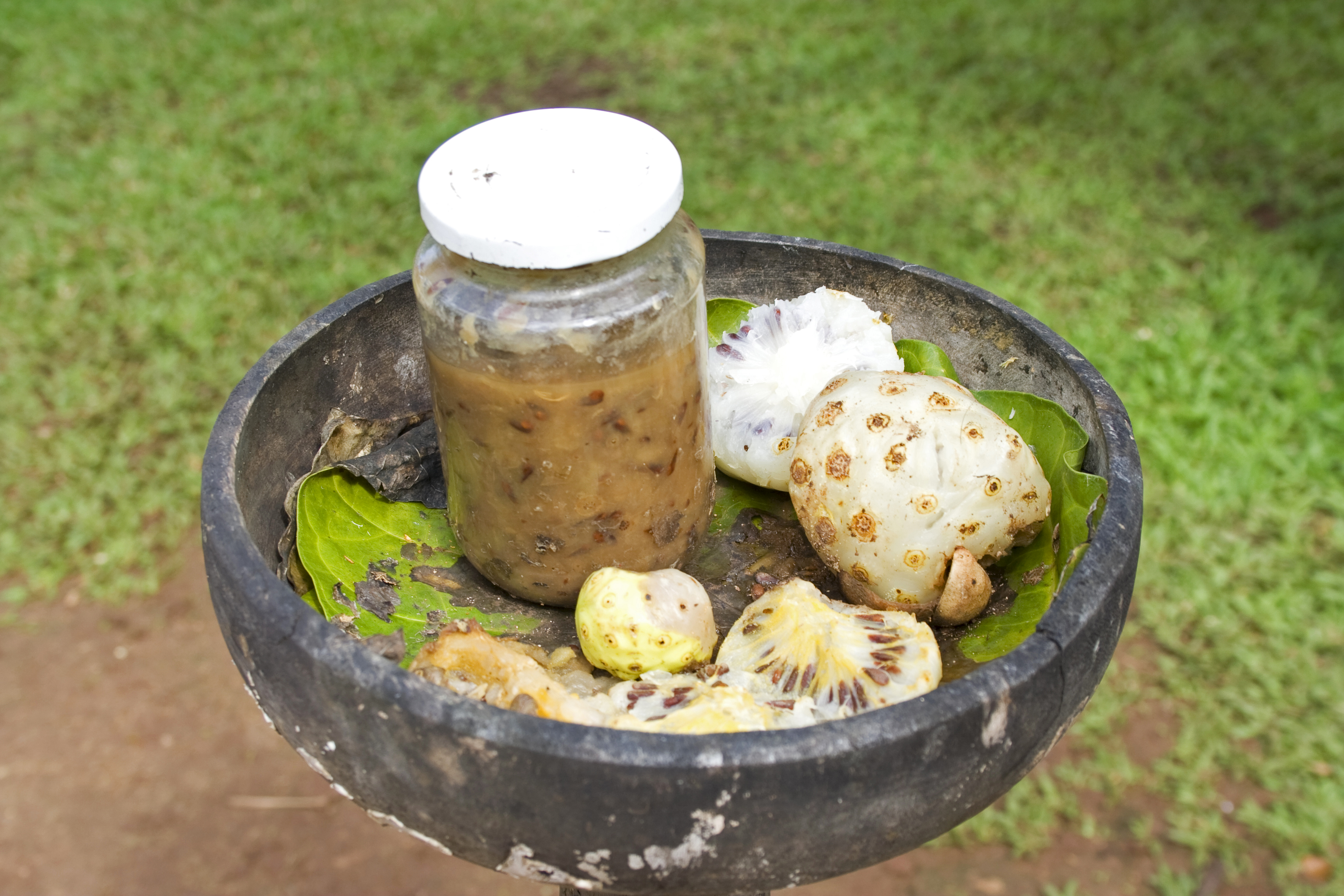
Noni fruit and juice

Noni juice is derived from the fruit of the Morinda citrifolia tree indigenous to Southeast Asia and Australasia. It has been promoted, illegally in several cases, as a cure for a number of human diseases. However, there is no evidence to support any claims of therapeutic benefit.

== Regulatory warnings ==
=== Tahitian Noni (Morinda, Inc.) ===
On August 26, 1998, the Attorneys General of Arizona, California, New Jersey, and Texas announced a multi-state settlement with Morinda, Inc. following charges that the company had made "unsubstantiated claims in consumer testimonials and other promotional material indicating that its Tahitian Noni juice could treat, cure or prevent numerous diseases such as diabetes, clinical depression, hemorrhoids and arthritis." Such claims rendered the beverage an unapproved new drug under state and federal food and drug laws and should not have been sold until it received approval. Under the terms of the agreement, Morinda agreed to:

- No longer make drug claims, or claims that the product can cure, treat, or prevent any disease until "Tahitian Noni" is approved and cleared for those uses by the U.S. Food and Drug Administration.
- Not make any other claims, whether health claims or others, regarding the benefits of Tahitian Noni unless such claims are true and the company can substantiate the claim by reliable scientific evidence.
- Not use testimonials which imply that the advertised claimed results are the typical or ordinary experience of consumers in actual conditions of use, unless Morinda possesses and relies upon adequate substantiation that the results are typical or ordinary.

=== Other ===
In August 2004, the US Food and Drug Administration issued a Warning Letter to Flora, Inc. for violating section 201(g)(1) of the Federal Food, Drug, and Cosmetic Act (the Act) [21 U.S.C. § 321(g)(1)]. Flora made twelve unfounded health claims about the purported benefits of noni juice as a medical product, in effect causing the juice to be evaluated as a drug. Under the Act, this necessitates all safety and clinical trial evidence for the juice providing such effects in humans.

The FDA letter also cited 1) absent scientific evidence for health benefits of the noni phytochemicals scopoletin and damnacanthal, neither of which has been confirmed with biological activity in humans, and 2) lack of scientific foundation for health claims made by two proponents of noni juice, Dr. Isabella Abbot and Dr. Ralph Heinicke. Two other FDA letters have been issued for the same types of violations.

== Toxicity ==
Research has pointed to anthraquinones found in noni roots, leaves and fruit as potentially toxic to the liver and other organs. In 2005, two published clinical case reports described incidents of acute hepatitis caused by ingesting Tahitian Noni juice. These case reports were reviewed in 2006 by the European Food Safety Authority (EFSA), which initially reported that data available at the time of the case reports were not sufficient to establish a causal relationship between consumption of the juice and hepatotoxicity; however, an increasing number of subsequent case reports suggested that some individuals may be particularly sensitive to hepatotoxic effects of noni fruit products. The U.S. National Center for Complementary and Integrative Health advised against consumption of noni products if one has a history of liver disorders.

The potential for toxicity caused by noni juices remained under surveillance by EFSA, individual food safety authorities in France, Finland and Ireland, and medical investigators in Germany.

Noni products may contain high amounts of potassium, leading to one advisory that people on potassium-restricted diets because of kidney problems should avoid using noni.

== Medical claims ==
Although noni plants and juices have been promoted by practitioners of alternative medicine as a cure for a number of human maladies including HIV, heart disease and cancer, the American Cancer Society concluded that "there is no reliable clinical evidence that noni juice is effective in preventing or treating cancer or any other disease in humans".

== See also ==
- List of unproven and disproven cancer treatments
- Tahitian Noni juice
