= Globicatella sanguinis =

Scientific classification
- Domain: Bacteria
- Kingdom: Bacillati
- Phylum: Bacillota
- Class: Bacilli
- Order: Lactobacillales
- Family: Aerococcaceae
- Genus: Globicatella
- Species: G. sanguinis

Binomial name
- Globicatella sanguinis Collins et al. 1995

Type strain
- ATCC 51173, CCUG 32999, CIP 107044, DSM 7447

Species of bacterium

Globicatella sanguinis is a bacterium from the family of Globicatella. Globicatella sanguinis can cause in rare cases acute meningitis and urosepsis.
