= Facklamia sourekii =

Scientific classification
- Domain: Bacteria
- Kingdom: Bacillati
- Phylum: Bacillota
- Class: Bacilli
- Order: Lactobacillales
- Family: Aerococcaceae
- Genus: Facklamia
- Species: F. sourekii

Binomial name
- Facklamia sourekii Collins et al. 1999

Type strain
- ATCC 700629, CCUG 28783 A, CIP 105940, 28783A, SS 1019, de Moor M13582

Species of Gram-positive bacterium

Facklamia sourekii is a Gram-positive and facultatively anaerobic bacteria from the family of Facklamia which has been isolated from humans.
