= Dolosigranulum pigrum =

Scientific classification
- Domain: Bacteria
- Kingdom: Bacillati
- Phylum: Bacillota
- Class: Bacilli
- Order: Lactobacillales
- Family: Carnobacteriaceae
- Genus: Dolosigranulum
- Species: D. pigrum

Binomial name
- Dolosigranulum pigrum Aguirre et al. 1994

Type strain
- ATCC 51524, CCUG 33392, CIP 104051, IFO 15550, LMG 15126, NBRC 15550, NCFB 2975, NCIMB 702975, R91/1468

Species of bacterium

Dolosigranulum pigrum is a Gram-positive bacterium from the genus of Dolosigranulum. Dolosigranulum pigrum can cause infections in the upper respiratory tract, as well as nosocomial pneumonia and sepsis. The metabolism of this organism has been reconstructed. It is available as a genome-scale metabolic model, which indicates incomplete biochemical pathways within the central carbon metabolism. Consequently, its metabolism depends on other members of its microbial habitat, such as Staphylococcus aureus, whose growth D. pigrum negatively impacts.

D. pigrum is highly adapted to the human nasal passages. In an analysis of 8,184 samples from six human body sites, Dolosigranulum sequencing reads were identified in 41% of nasal samples, 15% of skin samples, and less than 1% of fecal and oral cavity samples. Moreover, in samples in which Dolosigranulum was detected, the organism was far more abundant in nasal samples (18% mean relative abundance) than in samples from other body sites (less than 2% mean relative abundance). Analyses of data from the Earth Microbiome Project revealed that Dolosigranulum reads were rarely identified in environmental sources (e.g., water, soil) but were found in samples from a variety of animal species, including rodents, fish, birds, dogs, and primates.
