= Trichococcus alkaliphilus =

Scientific classification
- Domain: Bacteria
- Kingdom: Bacillati
- Phylum: Bacillota
- Class: Bacilli
- Order: Lactobacillales
- Family: Carnobacteriaceae
- Genus: Trichococcus
- Species: T. alkaliphilus

Binomial name
- Trichococcus alkaliphilus Dai et al. 2018

Type strain
- B5

Species of bacterium

Trichococcus alkaliphilus is a psychrotolerant and facultative anaerobic bacterium from the genus Trichococcus which has been isolated from the Zoige Wetland from the Qinghai-Tibetan Plateau.
