= Atopococcus tabaci =

Scientific classification
- Domain: Bacteria
- Kingdom: Bacillati
- Phylum: Bacillota
- Class: Bacilli
- Order: Lactobacillales
- Family: Carnobacteriaceae
- Genus: Atopococcus
- Species: A. tabaci

Binomial name
- Atopococcus tabaci Collins et al. 2005

Type strain
- CCUG 48253, CIP 108502, DSM 17538

Species of bacterium

Atopococcus tabaci is a Gram-positive and aerobic bacterium from the genus of Atopococcus which has been isolated from tobacco in Sweden.
