= Dolosicoccus paucivorans =

Scientific classification
- Domain: Bacteria
- Kingdom: Bacillati
- Phylum: Bacillota
- Class: Bacilli
- Order: Lactobacillales
- Family: Aerococcaceae
- Genus: Dolosicoccus
- Species: D. paucivorans

Binomial name
- Dolosicoccus paucivorans Collins et al. 1999

Type strain
- ATCC BAA-56, CCUG 39307, CIP 106314, DSM 15742, strain 2992-95

Species of bacterium

Dolosicoccus paucivorans is a Gram-positive bacteria from the family of Dolosicoccus which has been isolated from human blood in the United States.
