= Globicatella sulfidifaciens =

Scientific classification
- Domain: Bacteria
- Kingdom: Bacillati
- Phylum: Bacillota
- Class: Bacilli
- Order: Lactobacillales
- Family: Aerococcaceae
- Genus: Globicatella
- Species: G. sulfidifaciens

Binomial name
- Globicatella sulfidifaciens Vandamme et al. 2001

Type strain
- CCUG 44365, CIP 107175, DSM 15739, LMG 18844, GEM 604

Synonyms
- Globicatella sulfidofaciens

Species of bacterium

Globicatella sulfidifaciens is a Gram-positive bacteria from the family of Globicatella which has been isolated from the lungs of cattle and lambs in Belgium. It is associated with purulent infections of domestic mammals and urinary tracts of swine. Unlike other Globicatella species and species of related genera, G. sulfidifaciens is PYR negative. Globicatella sulfidifaciens bacteria are resistant against the antibiotics neomycin, erythromycin and clindamycin.
