= Facklamia =

Scientific classification
- Domain: Bacteria
- Kingdom: Bacillati
- Phylum: Bacillota
- Class: Bacilli
- Order: Lactobacillales
- Family: Aerococcaceae
- Genus: Facklamia; Collins et al. 1997

Type species
- Facklamia hominis Collins et al. 1997

Species
- F. hominis F. ignava F. languida F. miroungae F. sourekii F. tabacinasalis

Genus of Gram-positive bacteria

Facklamia is a Gram-positive genus of bacteria from the family Aerococcaceae. Facklamia bacteria are pathogens in humans.
