= Desemzia =

Scientific classification
- Domain: Bacteria
- Kingdom: Bacillati
- Phylum: Bacillota
- Class: Bacilli
- Order: Lactobacillales
- Family: Carnobacteriaceae
- Genus: Desemzia; Stackebrandt et al. 1999

Type species
- Desemzia incerta

Species
- D. incerta

Genus of bacteria

Desemzia is a bacterial genus from the family of Carnobacteriaceae, with one known species (Desemzia incerta).
