= Marinilactibacillus =

Scientific classification
- Domain: Bacteria
- Kingdom: Bacillati
- Phylum: Bacillota
- Class: Bacilli
- Order: Lactobacillales
- Family: Carnobacteriaceae
- Genus: Marinilactibacillus; Ishikawa et al. 2003

Type species
- Marinilactibacillus psychrotolerans

Species
- M. piezotolerans M. psychrotolerans

Synonyms
- Marinilactobacillus; Marinolactobacillus

Genus of bacteria

Marinilactibacillus is a genus of bacteria from the family of Carnobacteriaceae.
