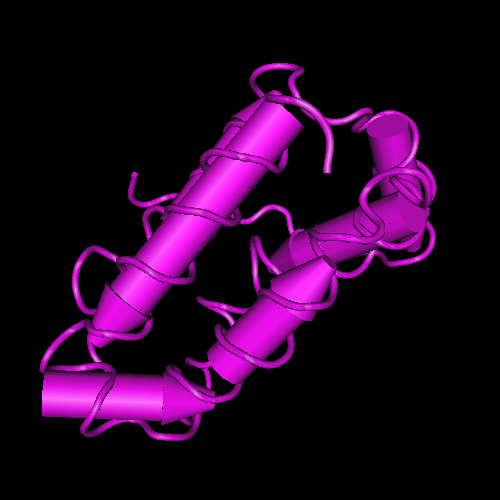
- NMR solution structure of the carnobacteriocin B2 protein

Scientific classification
- Domain: Bacteria
- Kingdom: Bacillati
- Phylum: Bacillota
- Class: Bacilli
- Order: Lactobacillales
- Family: Carnobacteriaceae
- Genus: Carnobacterium; Collins et al. 1987

Species
- Carnobacterium alterfunditum Carnobacterium divergens Carnobacterium funditium Carnobacterium gallinarum Carnobacterium iners Carnobacterium inhibens Carnobacterium jeotgali Carnobacterium maltaromaticum Carnobacterium mobile Carnobacterium piscicola Carnobacterium pleistocenium Carnobacterium viridans

= Carnobacterium =

Genus of bacteria

Carnobacterium is a genus of Gram-positive bacteria within the family Carnobacteriaceae. C. divergens and C. maltaromaticum are found in the wild and in food products and can grow anaerobically. These species are not known to be pathogenic in humans, but may cause disease in fish.

A species of Carnobacterium, C. maltaromaticum strain CB1, has been evaluated under the Canadian Environmental Protection Act, 1999, as a food additive for vacuum- or modified atmosphere-packaged ready-to-eat meat and fresh comminuted, processed meat. Based on the hazard and exposure considerations, the risk assessment conducted by Health Canada concluded that C. maltaromaticum strain CB1 is not considered to be toxic to the Canadian environment or human health as described in Section 64 of CEPA 1999.

Carnobacterium sp. has also been found in the gut of stingless carrion-eating vulture bees, besides other acidophilic (acid-loving) Lactobacillus sp.
