= Isobaculum =

Scientific classification
- Domain: Bacteria
- Kingdom: Bacillati
- Phylum: Bacillota
- Class: Bacilli
- Order: Lactobacillales
- Family: Carnobacteriaceae
- Genus: Isobaculum; Collins et al. 2002

Type species
- Isobaculum melis

Species
- I. melis

Genus of bacteria

Isobaculum is a Gram-positive and facultatively anaerobic genus of bacteria from the family of Carnobacteriaceae, with one known species (Isobaculum melis). Isobaculum melis has been isolated from the intestine of a badger in England.
