= Lacticigenium =

Scientific classification
- Domain: Bacteria
- Kingdom: Bacillati
- Phylum: Bacillota
- Class: Bacilli
- Order: Lactobacillales
- Family: Carnobacteriaceae
- Genus: Lacticigenium; Iino et al. 2009

Type species
- Lacticigenium naphtae

Species
- L. naphthae

Genus of bacteria

Lacticigenium is a Gram-positive, facultatively anaerobic, mesophilic, neutrophilic, non-spore-forming and motile genus of bacteria from the family of Carnobacteriaceae with one known species (L. naphthae).
