= Dolosicoccus =

Scientific classification
- Domain: Bacteria
- Kingdom: Bacillati
- Phylum: Bacillota
- Class: Bacilli
- Order: Lactobacillales
- Family: Aerococcaceae
- Genus: Dolosicoccus; Collins et al. 1999

Type species
- Dolosicoccus paucivorans Collins et al. 1999

Species
- D. paucivorans

Genus of bacteria

Dolosicoccus is a Gram-positive, facultatively anaerobic and non-motile genus of bacteria from the family of Aerococcaceae with one known species (Dolosicoccus paucivorans).
