= Alkalibacterium =

Scientific classification
- Domain: Bacteria
- Kingdom: Bacillati
- Phylum: Bacillota
- Class: Bacilli
- Order: Lactobacillales
- Family: Carnobacteriaceae
- Genus: Alkalibacterium; Ntougias and Russell 2001

Type species
- A. olivapovliticus

Genus of bacteria

Alkalibacterium is a genus in the phylum Bacillota (Bacteria).

== Etymology ==
The generic name Alkalibacterium derives from: Latin alkali (ashes of saltwort) alkali; and bacterium, a small rod, to give "a bacterium living under alkaline conditions".

== Species ==
The genus contains eleven species:

- A. gilvum Ishikawa et al. 2013
- A. iburiense Nakajima et al. 2005, named for Iburi, the place where the micro-organism was isolated
- A. indicireducens Yumoto et al. 2008, with indicireducens meaning indigo-reducing
- A. kapii Ishikawa et al. 2009, kapii meaning of ka-pi, a Thai fermented shrimp paste
- A. olivapovliticus corrig. Ntougias and Russell 2001, type species of the genus, with olivapovliticus meaning pertaining to the waste of the olives
- A. olivoapovliticus Ntougias and Russell 2001
- A. pelagium Ishikawa et al. 2009, pelagium, of the sea, marine
- A. psychrotolerans Yumoto et al. 2004, with psychrotolerans meaning tolerating a cold environment
- A. putridalgicola Ishikawa et al. 2009, from putridalgicola meaning dweller on putrid marine algae
- A. subtropicum shikawa et al. 2011
- A. thalassium Ishikawa et al. 2009 with thalassium meaning of/from the sea
