= Morinda, Inc. =

American multi-level marketing company

Morinda
- Company type: Subsidiary of Morinda Holdings, Inc.
- Industry: Multi-level Marketing
- Founded: July 1, 1996
- Headquarters: American Fork, Utah
- Key people: Kerry O. Asay, John Wadsworth, Kelly Olsen, Kim Asay, Stephen Story
- Website: http://www.morinda.com

Morinda is a multi-level marketing company based in American Fork, Utah that sells Tahitian Noni juice and other products made from the noni plant. The company was founded in 1996 and has manufacturing facilities in Tahiti, Japan, China, Germany, and Utah. Morinda, formerly known as Tahitian Noni International and Morinda Bioactives, was a subsidiary of Morinda Holdings, Inc. prior to merging with and becoming a wholly owned subsidiary of New Age Beverages Corporation in December 2019.

== Products ==
Morinda's main product is a noni juice blend sold under the brand name Tahitian Noni. The company also markets various dietary supplements, personal care products, and essential oils.

Tahitian Noni juice consists of a blend of pasteurized reconstituted noni puree (89%) mixed with grape and blueberry juice concentrates (11%), which is pasteurized prior to bottling. The manufacturer's recommended serving size is 30 mL/day (1 ounce). Several websites and blogs claimed there are many health benefits of noni juices. However, according to the European Commission's Scientific Committee on Food, the nutritional content (i.e., macronutrients, vitamins, and minerals) of Tahitian Noni juice is comparable to the ranges known for typical fruit juices, and the agency concluded that there was no evidence that the juice had any special health benefits beyond those of other fruit juices. The nutritional content of noni juice is roughly comparable to that of apple juice.

== Controversy ==
=== Attorneys General (AZ, CA, NJ, TX) vs. Morinda Holdings, Inc. ===
On August 26, 1998, the Attorneys General of Arizona, California, New Jersey, and Texas announced a multi-state settlement with Morinda, Inc., the charges stating that Morinda had made "unsubstantiated claims in consumer testimonials and other promotional material that its Tahitian Noni juice could treat, cure or prevent numerous diseases, including diabetes, clinical depression, hemorrhoids and arthritis." Such claims rendered the beverage an unapproved new drug under state and federal food and drug laws and should not have been sold until it received approval. Under the terms of the agreement, Morinda agreed to:

- No longer make drug claims, or claims that the product can cure, treat, or prevent any disease until "Tahitian Noni" is approved and cleared for those uses by the U.S. Food and Drug Administration.
- Not make any other claims, whether health claims or others, regarding the benefits of Tahitian Noni unless such claims are true and the company can substantiate the claim by reliable scientific evidence.
- Not use testimonials which imply that the advertised claimed results are the typical or ordinary experience of consumers in actual conditions of use, unless Morinda possesses and relies upon adequate substantiation that the results are typical or ordinary.

The settlement also called for Morinda to pay $100,000 for investigative costs and to provide a refund for the full purchase price to any consumer who submitted a written refund request.

=== Tahitian Noni & XanGo settlement ===
Tahitian Noni sued XanGo and several of its top executives in February 2003 in 4th District Court in Provo, Utah, alleging that executives stole Tahitian Noni's concept for a mangosteen-based supplement while they were employed by TNI's parent-company, to which XanGo counter-sued. In a joint statement, Tahitian Noni and XanGo did not disclose particulars regarding the settlement, only stating that they have "agreed to resolve their disputes and the litigation between them and their founders."

=== Possible contamination in Spain ===
Residents of Spain were alerted in February 2007 to avoid consuming certain improperly labeled bottles of Tahitian Noni Juice while the health department there awaited toxicology reports for a man who died after drinking the juice. According to reports in Spain, a 40-year-old man from Ogijares drank some noni juice for breakfast and began to experience strange sensations in his mouth and blurred vision. He died shortly thereafter, and another family member, who also drank some juice, reported similar symptoms. Reports stated that there were large amounts of cocaine found in the bottles and the body of the deceased man.

The bottles recovered from the deceased man's home were submitted to the Spanish Institute of Toxicology, where it was confirmed the bottles were contaminated with cocaine. The bottles in question bore labels from Mexico, and the lot number and expiration dates were illegible. Spanish authorities urged consumers to check the labels on their bottles of juice and report any irregularities. Consumers were also asked not to purchase bottles of juice outside the company's normal distribution channels.

=== Hepatotoxicity ===
Following several medical case reports of hepatotoxicity among consumers of noni juice, a 2009 study on Tahitian Noni by the European Food Safety Authority advised that data available at the time of the case reports were not sufficient to establish a causal relationship between consumption of the juice and hepatotoxicity; however, an increasing number of subsequent case reports suggested that some individuals may be particularly sensitive to hepatotoxic effects of noni fruit products.
