= Pisciglobus =

Scientific classification
- Domain: Bacteria
- Kingdom: Bacillati
- Phylum: Bacillota
- Class: Bacilli
- Order: Lactobacillales
- Family: Carnobacteriaceae
- Genus: Pisciglobus; Tanasupawat et al. 2011

Type species
- Pisciglobus halotolerans

Species
- P. halotolerans

Genus of bacteria

Pisciglobus is a Gram-positive, facultatively anaerobic, non-spore-forming and non-motile genus of bacteria from the family of Carnobacteriaceae with one known species (Pisciglobus halotolerans). Pisciglobus halotolerans has been isolated from fish sauce from Thailand.
