= Allofustis =

Scientific classification
- Domain: Bacteria
- Kingdom: Bacillati
- Phylum: Bacillota
- Class: Bacilli
- Order: Lactobacillales
- Family: Carnobacteriaceae
- Genus: Allofustis; Collins et al. 2003

Type species
- Allofustis semini

Species
- A. seminis

Genus of bacteria

Allofustis is a Gram-positive, rod-shaped, facultatively anaerobic and non-spore-forming bacterial genus from the family of Carnobacteriaceae, with one known species (Allofustis seminis).
