= Globicatella =

Scientific classification
- Domain: Bacteria
- Kingdom: Bacillati
- Phylum: Bacillota
- Class: Bacilli
- Order: Lactobacillales
- Family: Aerococcaceae
- Genus: Globicatella; Collins et al. 1995

Type species
- Globicatella sanguinis

Species
- Globicatella sanguinis Globicatella sulfidifaciens

Genus of bacteria

Globicatella is a non-spore-forming and non-motile genus of bacteria from the family of Aerococcaceae. Globicatella sanguinis can in rare cases cause infections of the bloodstream, heart, central nervous system, or urinary tract.

A novel and unnamed species has been identified causing soft tissue infection following a cat bite.
