= Ignavigranum =

Scientific classification
- Domain: Bacteria
- Kingdom: Bacillati
- Phylum: Bacillota
- Class: Bacilli
- Order: Lactobacillales
- Family: Aerococcaceae
- Genus: Ignavigranum; Collins et al. 1999

Type species
- Ignavigranum ruoffiae Collins et al. 1999

Species
- I. ruoffiae

Genus of bacteria

Ignavigranum is a Gram-positive, facultatively anaerobic non-spore-forming and non-motile genus of bacteria from the family of Aerococcaceae with one known species (Ignavigranum ruoffiae).
