= Atopostipes =

Scientific classification
- Domain: Bacteria
- Kingdom: Bacillati
- Phylum: Bacillota
- Class: Bacilli
- Order: Lactobacillales
- Family: Carnobacteriaceae
- Genus: Atopostipes; Cotta et al. 2004

Type species
- Atopostipes suicloacalis

Species
- A. suicloacalis

Genus of bacteria

Atopostipes is a Gram-positive, non-spore-forming, facultatively anaerobic and non-motile bacterial genus from the family of Carnobacteriaceae, with one known species (Atopostipes suicloacalis).
