= Dolosigranulum =

Scientific classification
- Domain: Bacteria
- Kingdom: Bacillati
- Phylum: Bacillota
- Class: Bacilli
- Order: Lactobacillales
- Family: Carnobacteriaceae
- Genus: Dolosigranulum; Aguirre et al. 1994

Type species
- Dolosigranulum pigrum

Species
- D. pigrum

Genus of bacteria

Dolosigranulum is a Gram-positive, non-spore-forming, facultatively anaerobic and non-motile bacterial genus from the family of Carnobacteriaceae, with one known species (Dolosigranulum pigrum).
