= Atopococcus =

Scientific classification
- Domain: Bacteria
- Kingdom: Bacillati
- Phylum: Bacillota
- Class: Bacilli
- Order: Lactobacillales
- Family: Carnobacteriaceae
- Genus: Atopococcus; Collins et al. 2005

Type species
- Atopococcus tabaci

Species
- A. tabaci

Genus of bacteria

Atopococcus is a Gram-positive, non-spore-forming and non-motile bacterial genus from the family of Carnobacteriaceae, with one known species (Atopococcus tabaci).
