= Eremococcus =

Scientific classification
- Domain: Bacteria
- Kingdom: Bacillati
- Phylum: Bacillota
- Class: Bacilli
- Order: Lactobacillales
- Family: Aerococcaceae
- Genus: Eremococcus; Collins et al. 1999

Type species
- Eremococcus coleocola Collins et al. 1999<

Species
- E. coleocola

Genus of bacteria

Eremococcus is a genus of bacteria from the family of Aerococcaceae with one known species (Eremococcus coleocola).
