= Alloiococcus =

Scientific classification
- Domain: Bacteria
- Kingdom: Bacillati
- Phylum: Bacillota
- Class: Bacilli
- Order: Lactobacillales
- Family: Carnobacteriaceae
- Genus: Alloiococcus; Aguirre and Collins 1992

Type species
- Alloiococcus otitis

Species
- A. otitis

Genus of bacteria

Alloiococcus is a genus of Gram-positive and nonmotile bacteria from the family of Carnobacteriaceae. Only one species of this genus is known (Alloiococcus otitis).
