= XanGo =

American multi-level marketing company

Xango, LLC.
- Type: Acquired
- Industry: Multi-level Marketing
- Founded: 2002
- Defunct: 2017
- Headquarters: Lehi, Utah, USA
- Key people: Aaron Garrity, Gary Hollister, Joe Morton, Gordon Morton and Kent Wood
- Website: Xango.com at the Wayback Machine (archived May 16, 2017)

Xango, LLC, (sometimes referred to as XANGO and XanGo) was an American multi-level marketing company founded in 2002. It was acquired by Zija International in May 2017.

The company marketed and distributed Xango juice, a blended juice product consisting of mangosteen and other juices, and skin care, personal care, energy supplement and nutritional supplement products. The company was warned in 2006 by the FDA for illegally marketing more than 20 human health benefits for Xango juice.

== Company overview ==
=== Executives 2008–2012 ===
- Gary Hollister, founder, chairman emeritus, former chief executive, former chairman of the Board
- Aaron Garrity, founder, chairman of the board, CEO, former president
- Joe Morton, founder, board of directors
- Gordon Morton, founder, board of directors
- Kent Wood, founder, board of directors

=== Revenues 2003–2012 ===
Xango was a privately held company and as such did not publicly disclose its financial statements. Company press releases in 2005–2006 stated that sales totaled $40 million in 2003 and $150 million in 2004, and that 2005 sales were more than twice those of 2004. In October 2007 the company said that cumulative sales since its inception five years earlier were over $1 billion and by November 2008 had exceeded $1.5 billion.

In December 2012, Direct Selling News reported that Xango concluded its first ten years of operation in November 2012 with sales operations in 43 countries, 27 office locations, 49 distribution centers, more than two million distributors, and about $2 billion in cumulative revenues. Xango's revenues and annual reports have fueled much public and legal speculation that it is a pyramid scheme.

=== Financial sponsorships and contributions ===
In November 2006, Xango, LLC, became the official corporate jersey-front sponsor of Real Salt Lake, an MLS soccer team based in Salt Lake City, Utah, for seven years, at a cost of between $500,000 and $1 million per year. Xango's contract with Real Salt Lake ended after the 2013 season. In 2006, the company made a 5-year, $1 million grant to an Orem, Utah arts council for naming rights to what is now called the "Xango Grand Theater". Xango, LLC, has been the top contributor to the political campaign of Utah senator Orrin Hatch, contributing $47,200 in 2008 and $46,700 in 2006, according to OpenSecrets.

== Products ==
Xango Juice was sold in the U.S. and (as of late-2011) exported to Australia, Canada, Germany, Japan, Malaysia, Mexico, Singapore, Sweden, and the United Kingdom. The company began operating in Taiwan as of October 2007.

The company's business model was direct sales via multi-level marketing rather than retail sales, mainly using a nine-level multi-level marketing structure. In June 2006, the company said it had 350,000 distributors. In July, the company told the Federal Trade Commission that there were "roughly 500,000 distributors worldwide", and in November, it reported having more than 600 employees at its Lehi headquarters and more than 500,000 independent distributors in 15 international markets. In July 2007, it said it had about 700,000 distributors, of whom an estimated 70 percent simply use their status to buy the juice at the discounted membership price. In October 2008, it said that it operated in 24 countries and had more than 1 million independent distributors. As of 2013, the company stated that it operated in 43 countries.

In the United States, Xango Juice sold for a retail price of $37.50 for a 750 ml (25.35 ounce) bottle.

=== Xango Juice composition ===
Xango Juice was a blend of mangosteen aril and pericarp purée with juice concentrates of eight other fruits: apple, pear (juice and purée), grape, blueberry, raspberry, strawberry, cranberry and cherry. Other ingredients include citric acid, natural flavor, pectin, xanthan gum, sodium benzoate, and potassium sorbate. Xango claimed its juice contains xanthonoid compounds from the mangosteen pericarp.

Associated Press commissioned the Linus Pauling Institute to measure the in vitro antioxidant strength of Xango Juice against retail fruit juices. The antioxidant strength of XanGo Juice measured slightly higher than cranberry juice but lower than black cherry and less than half the value for blueberry juice. However, the value of in vitro analysis of antioxidant strength is questionable, as there was no current evidence that antioxidant phytochemicals present in Xango or other fruit juices actually have functions inside the human body. The measurements of antioxidant strength apply to test tubes, but consumed juices are affected by stomach acids that would neutralize or destroy antioxidant value preventing the same biological effects in vivo.

== False advertising claims ==
=== Pericarp xanthones and potential health effects ===
According to a 2006 warning by the US Food and Drug Administration, XanGo's distributors had illegally used marketing materials to promote mangosteen juice claiming more than 20 human health benefits, including "anti-inflammatory," "anti-microbial," "anti-fungal," "anti-viral," "anti-cancer," "anti-ulcer," "anti-hepatotoxic," "anti-rhinoviral," and "anti-allergic" effects. Promotional literature for the product cites antioxidants from the inedible pericarp of the fruit as providing health benefits. None of these claims, however, has scientific proof established by peer-reviewed research and human clinical trials, as discussed below.

The American Cancer Society profile of mangosteen juice stated there was no reliable evidence that mangosteen juice, purée, or bark is effective as a cancer treatment in humans. As of April 2013, it also stated that the mangosteen "fruit has been shown to be rich in antioxidants. Very early laboratory studies suggest it may have promise as a topical treatment for acne. Early small laboratory and animal studies suggest that further research should be done to determine whether it can help to prevent cancer in humans."

In 2009, XanGo scientific adviser, David Morton, participated in a four-part debate on the disputed claims of mangosteen health benefits.

=== U.S. FDA warning ===
On September 20, 2006, the United States Food and Drug Administration issued a warning letter to Xango LLC International in response to the company's promotion of Xango juice as an aid to treat and/or cure various diseases. The agency's letter warned that Xango juice had not been properly tested for safety and efficacy, and as a proposed new drug, it could not be legally sold in the U.S. without prior approval of the FDA. Xango was warned that it could face enforcement action including seizure and/or injunction of products or suspension of business. Under FDA drug labeling rules, Xango, as manufacturer, is responsible for satisfying scientific criteria to make health claims on its product labels and all marketing materials. As of September 2008, the case remained open.

=== Effectiveness ===
In February 2006, the U.C. Berkeley Wellness Newsletter, sponsored by the University of California at Berkeley, said that "Mangosteen marketers make farfetched and unsubstantiated claims for their products." The newsletter notes that "there are no clinical trials, and what happens in a test tube or animal may not occur in a human. Any reported benefits in humans have been anecdotal. No one even knows if the processed fruit juice and capsules retain the potentially beneficial compounds. What’s more, the juice is typically a mix of fruit juices – with an undisclosed amount of mangosteen in it."

Ralph Moss, an alternative cancer treatment advocate, has said of mangosteen juice:

In my opinion, what we have here is simply an overpriced fruit drink. Fruit drinks are often healthful beverages. But the only reason I can see that the promoters of mangosteen can get away with charging $37 for this product is that they are playing on patients' hopes and fears in a cynical way. Without the health claims, open or implied, the product could only be sold for at most $5 or $6 (which, for example, is the cost of antioxidant-rich pomegranate juice).

A 2008 medical case report described a patient with severe acidosis possibly attributable to a year of daily use (to lose weight, dose not described) of mangosteen juice (brand not described) infused with xanthonoids, as occurs in the manufacture of Xango juice. The authors proposed that chronic exposure to alpha-mangostin, a xanthone, could be toxic to mitochondrial function, leading to impairment of cellular respiration and production of lactic acidosis.

=== Italian antitrust action ===
In 2011, Italy's antitrust and consumer protection authority, the AGCM, suspended the activities of Xango in response to over-broad health claims, as well as possible violations of pyramid scheme laws.

== Litigation ==
=== Tahitian Noni International ===
Tahitian Noni International (TNI), a rival MLM beverage company, sued Xango, LLC, and several of its top executives in February 2003 in the 4th District Court in Provo, Utah, alleging that Xango executives stole TNI's concept for a mangosteen-based supplement while they were employed by TNI's parent-company. After a countersuit against TNI was launched by Xango, LLC, the two parties settled out of court. A joint statement by TNI and Xango said that they had "agreed to resolve their disputes and the litigation between them and their founders" but the particulars of the settlement were not disclosed.

=== Mismanagement allegations ===
In 2009, the Utah Supreme Court allowed a Xango investor to proceed with a lawsuit that alleges corporate looting and mismanagement of millions of dollars by the Lehi supplements company's founders for their personal expenses including luxury cars and performance-enhancing medical treatments. The Utah Supreme Court overturned a 4th District Court ruling that dismissed a lawsuit filed in 2007 by Angel Investors LLC alleging Xango's founders took millions of dollars in personal loans from the company and paid themselves excessive salaries while wasting corporate assets. In 2010, XanGo settled with Angel Investors for an undisclosed amount of money. "Angel Investors, who had owned no more than 1 percent of the Lehi company, had charged in three lawsuits in Utah County that the founders deprived them of some of the return on their investment. The group cited such expenditures as $6,000 monthly auto allowances, family vacations and, in one case, $20,000 worth of home furnishings." The terms of the settlement were not disclosed.

In 2013, Xango founder Bryan Davis filed a lawsuit accusing his partners of spying, threatening employees, falsifying distributor positions to siphon off funds, defrauding on Xango taxes and their personal taxes, falsifying records, changing credit card statements, charging as business expenses to purchase grand pianos, vacations, home renovations, landscaping, electronics, expensive bicycles, scooters, and for CEO Aaron Garrity, an open expense account for one mistress.

According to the lawsuit, Garrity embezzled hundreds of thousands of dollars in assets from the company, writing off clothing, medical enhancements, jewelry, event tickets, bicycles, electronics and chartered planes and vacations as business expenses. CFO Nate Brown set up secret founder accounts for Garrity and others to allow them to improperly spend Xango assets. Garrity's attorney refuted the claim, saying the allegations are to help Davis inflate his share holdings for a greater profit.

Also in 2013, Xango filed an action against Bryan Davis in the Third Judicial District Court (Utah and Salt Lake City) refuting Mr Davis' claims in his lawsuit and claiming that Mr Davis was negligent in his duties. Xango settled these cases ultimately, out of court for an undisclosed amount.

=== Taxation issues ===
In 2012, Xango had issues concerning taxes. "At the top of 2012 tax delinquency lists was $347,816 owed for the Lehi headquarters of Xango, a multilevel marketing company that sells nutritional supplements — which has its name on the uniforms of Real Salt Lake soccer players. That property is owned by Thai Properties, which is part of the same corporate group as Xango, said Nate Brown, chief financial officer for Xango".

== See also ==
- List of ineffective cancer treatments
