= Damnacanthal =

- Chemical structure of damnacanthal

Names
- Preferred IUPAC name 3-Hydroxy-1-methoxy-9,10-dioxo-9,10-dihydroanthracene-2-carbaldehyde
- Other names 3-Hydroxy-1-methoxyanthraquinone-2-aldehyde

Identifiers
| CAS Number | 477-84-9 |
| 3D model (JSmol) | Interactive image |
| ChEMBL | ChEMBL212948 |
| ChemSpider | 2843 |
| ECHA InfoCard | 100.208.625 |
| PubChem CID | 2948 |
| UNII | WUC3CB63CD |
| CompTox Dashboard (EPA) | DTXSID10197253 |
- InChI: InChI=1S/C16H10O5/c1-21-16-11(7-17)12(18)6-10-13(16)15(20)9-5-3-2-4-8(9)14(10)19/h2-7,18H,1H3 Key: IPDMWUNUULAXLU-UHFFFAOYSA-N; InChI=1S/C16H10O5/c1-21-16-11(7-17)12(18)6-10-13(16)15(20)9-5-3-2-4-8(9)14(10)19/h2-7,18H,1H3
- SMILES: COC1=C2C(=CC(=C1C=O)O)C(=O)C3=CC=CC=C3C2=O

Properties
| Chemical formula | C_{16}H_{10}O_{5} |
| Molar mass | 282.251 g·mol^{−1} |
| Density | 1.461 g/mL |
| Boiling point | 532 °C (990 °F; 805 K) |

Related compounds
| Related arylformaldehydes | Gossypol Pyridoxal |
- Except where otherwise noted, data are given for materials in their standard state (at 25 °C [77 °F], 100 kPa). verify (what is ?) Infobox references

Damnacanthal is an anthraquinone isolated from the root of Morinda citrifolia, using water or organic solvents.

== Pharmacology ==
In a 1995 in vitro study, damnacanthal was found to act as a potent and selective inhibitor of p56lck tyrosine kinase.
