= Bavariicoccus =

Scientific classification
- Domain: Bacteria
- Kingdom: Bacillati
- Phylum: Bacillota
- Class: Bacilli
- Order: Lactobacillales
- Family: Enterococcaceae
- Genus: Bavariicoccus; Schmidt et al. 2009
- Species: B. seileri

Binomial name
- Bavariicoccus seileri Schmidt et al. 2009

Type strain
- CCUG 55508; DSM 19936; WCC 4188

Genus of bacteria

Bavariicoccus is a genus of bacteria of the phylum Bacillota. This genus contains a single species, Bavariicoccus seileri, strains of which were originally isolated from German soft cheese. Bacterial taxonomists have suggested that Bavariicoccus may be more appropriately placed within the family Carnobacteriaceae.
