= Trichococcus =

Scientific classification
- Domain: Bacteria
- Kingdom: Bacillati
- Phylum: Bacillota
- Class: Bacilli
- Order: Lactobacillales
- Family: Carnobacteriaceae
- Genus: Trichococcus; Scheff et al. 1984

Type species
- Trichococcus flocculiformis

Species
- T. alkaliphilus T. collinsii T. flocculiformis T. ilyis T. paludicola T. palustris T. pasteurii T. patagoniensis T. shcherbakoviae

Synonyms
- Lactosphaera

Genus of bacteria

Trichococcus is a mesophilic and psychrotolerant genus of bacteria from the family of Carnobacteriaceae. Trichococcus bacteria have the ability to utilize sugars, sugar alcohols and polysaccharides. Some species of Trichococcus species where transferred from the genera Lactosphaera and Ruminococcus.
