= Abiotrophia =

Scientific classification
- Domain: Bacteria
- Kingdom: Bacillati
- Phylum: Bacillota
- Class: Bacilli
- Order: Lactobacillales
- Family: Aerococcaceae
- Genus: Abiotrophia; Y. Kawamura et al. 1995

Type species
- Abiotrophia defectiva

Species
- Abiotrophia defectiva

Genus of bacteria

Abiotrophia is a genus of lactic acid bacteria, a family in the phylum Bacillota (Bacteria).

== Taxonomy ==
The genus was described in 1995 from two species formerly placed in Streptococcus. Two further species were described in 1999, comprising a total of four species. In 2000, Collins and Lawsons further differentiated A. adiacens, A. balaenopterae and A. elegans from A. defectiva by placing them into the new genus Granulicatella, since this reclassification Abiotrophia is currently a monotypic genus.

The genus contained 4 species of coccus shaped species, 2 are former members of the genus Streptococcus, which were transferred in 1995 to the newly coined genus Abiotrophia:

- A. adiacens ( (Bouvet et al. 1989) Kawamura et al. 1995; Latin feminine gender adjective adiacens, adjacent, indicating that this organism can grow as satellite colonies adjacent to other bacterial growth.)
- A. defectiva ( (Bouvet et al. 1989) Kawamura et al. 1995, comb. nov. (Type species of the genus).; Latin feminine gender adjective defectiva, deficient.)

Other 2 are latter additions:

- A. balaenopterae ( Lawson et al. 1999; Neo-Latin genitive case noun balaenopterae, pertaining to the minke whale, Balaenoptera acutorostrata, from which the organism was isolated.)
- A. elegans ( Roggenkamp et al. 1999; Latin feminine gender adjective elegans, choice, nice, elegant.) Abiotrophia elegans was reclassified to Granulicatella elegans.

=== Etymology ===
The name Abiotrophia derives from the Greek prefix ἄ (a)-, negative (un-); Greek noun βιος (bios), life; Greek noun τροφιά (trophia), nutrition; Neo-Latin feminine gender noun Abiotrophia, life-nutrition-deficiency.

== Genome Sequence ==
For the Human Microbiome Project (HMP), the genome of Abiotrophia defectiva ATCC 49176 has been sequenced (assembly) as it is a resident of human oral cavity and urogenital and intestinal tracts and is a cause of infective endocarditis, showing it to have 3291 protein encoded in a 3.4774 Mbp genome with a GC content of 37.0%

== Disease ==
Formerly classified as nutritionally variant streptococci, A. elegans had been identified as a cause of 1 to 2% of blood culture negative bacterial infective endocarditis.
