= Atopobacter =

Scientific classification
- Domain: Bacteria
- Kingdom: Bacillati
- Phylum: Bacillota
- Class: Bacilli
- Order: Lactobacillales
- Family: Carnobacteriaceae
- Genus: Atopobacter; Lawson et al. 2000

Type species
- Atopobacter phocae

Species
- A. phocae

Genus of bacteria

Atopobacter is a Gram-positive, rod-shaped and facultatively anaerobic genus of bacteria from the family of Carnobacteriaceae with one known species (A. phocae). Atopobacter phocae has been isolated from common seals.
