= Jeotgalibaca =

Scientific classification
- Domain: Bacteria
- Kingdom: Bacillati
- Phylum: Bacillota
- Class: Bacilli
- Order: Lactobacillales
- Family: Carnobacteriaceae
- Genus: Jeotgalibaca; Lee et al. 2014

Type species
- Jeotgalibaca dankookensis

Species
- J. arthritidis J. ciconiae J. dankookensis J. porci

Genus of bacteria

Jeotgalibaca is a genus of bacteria from the family Carnobacteriaceae.

Jeotgalibaca, a gram-positive bacterium, is found in traditional Korean salted and fermented food, it is made by adding 20–30 % salt to various types of seafood. Seujeot is a type of jeotgalibaca, the name deriving from the Korean words seu (shrimp) and jeot (jeotgalibaca). Among other seafoods, salted shrimp (25% w/v), seawater and other ingredients are used for its preparation and subsequent fermentation. Salt-resistant aerobic and anaerobic bacteria exist in most jeotgals and recent studies have reported the isolation of many novel species and genera from this food.

This also shows how it follows all members of its family of Jeotgals in salt resistance. Jeotgalibaca is used in Panjin shrimp paste and in other pastes that are fermented from grasshopper sub shrimps. Grasshopper sub shrimps are found in the water that borders seawater and freshwater, the whole bodies are transparent, and the longest length are only 0.008–0.01 m. Due to the tiny sizes of grasshopper sub shrimp, shrimp pastes that are made from them tend to have lower fat and cholesterol content, and higher astaxanthin and calcium levels than that made from other shrimps. Panjin is located in the southwestern part of Liaoning Province, the center of the Liaohe River Delta in China

There are six major genera of bacteria (Jeotgalibaca, Jeotgalicoccus, Lysinibacillus, Sporosarcina, Staphylococcus, and Psychrobacter) that were found to be positively correlated with Biogenic amines (BA) production level, suggesting that these bacteria might have a strong tendency to produce BAs. In recent years, there are some studies related to the impact of microbial diversity on BAs formation in fermented food, such as fish sauce, sausages, and soy sauce.

== Cell morphology and features ==
This bacterium is heavily used in fermentation of some Korean foods therefore is able to withstand environments of extremely high salinity. Cell morphology as described from a primary source found that Jeotgalibaca is “Gram-positive and consisted of non-motile, non-spore-forming, coccus-shaped cells which [are] grouped into tetrads, sarcinae and conglomerates”

== Phylogeny and genome evolution ==
The genomics and phylogeny of the Jeotgalibaca. We were able to find the components of the DNA composition of the bacteria and see how it compares to the other related phylogeny. “Levels of DNA sequence similarity of the groEL DNA contig (465 bp) of strain EX-07T were 81.3–82.8 % when compared with the type strains of all species of the genus Trichococcus and less than 76 % with the type strains of species of the genera Bavariicoccus and Granulicatella . Figure 1 shows the phylogenetic relationship between strain EX-07T and its closest relatives based on groEL sequences. The novel isolate formed an independent branch supported by a 100 % bootstrap value and confirmed the moderate relationship with all members of the genus Trichococcus . The combined results of the 16S rRNA gene and groEL sequence analyses support the classification of strain EX-07T within a new genus”

== Metabolic activity ==
Jeotgalibaca was tested under various environmental conditions, and it grows well on TSA plates. No growth was obtained on NA, PDA, and R2A agar. It is an aerobic microbe that gets carbon from sugars and organic acids such as D-gluconic acid and has chymotrypsin activity The related species, Coriobacteriaceae (phylum Actinobacteria), possess very similar metabolic processes to Jeotgalibaca. They have been “... reported to be involved in the metabolism of bile salts and steroids as well as the activation of dietary polyphenols in the human gut”. In particular, strong positive correlations between Coriobacteriaceae and the steroid aldosterone 18-glucuronide (r = 0.7, p < 0.001) were found in our study. “Aldosterone 18-glucuronide, an important metabolite of aldosterone, performs many important functions, such as cell signaling, fuel and energy storage, and membrane integrity/stability.”
