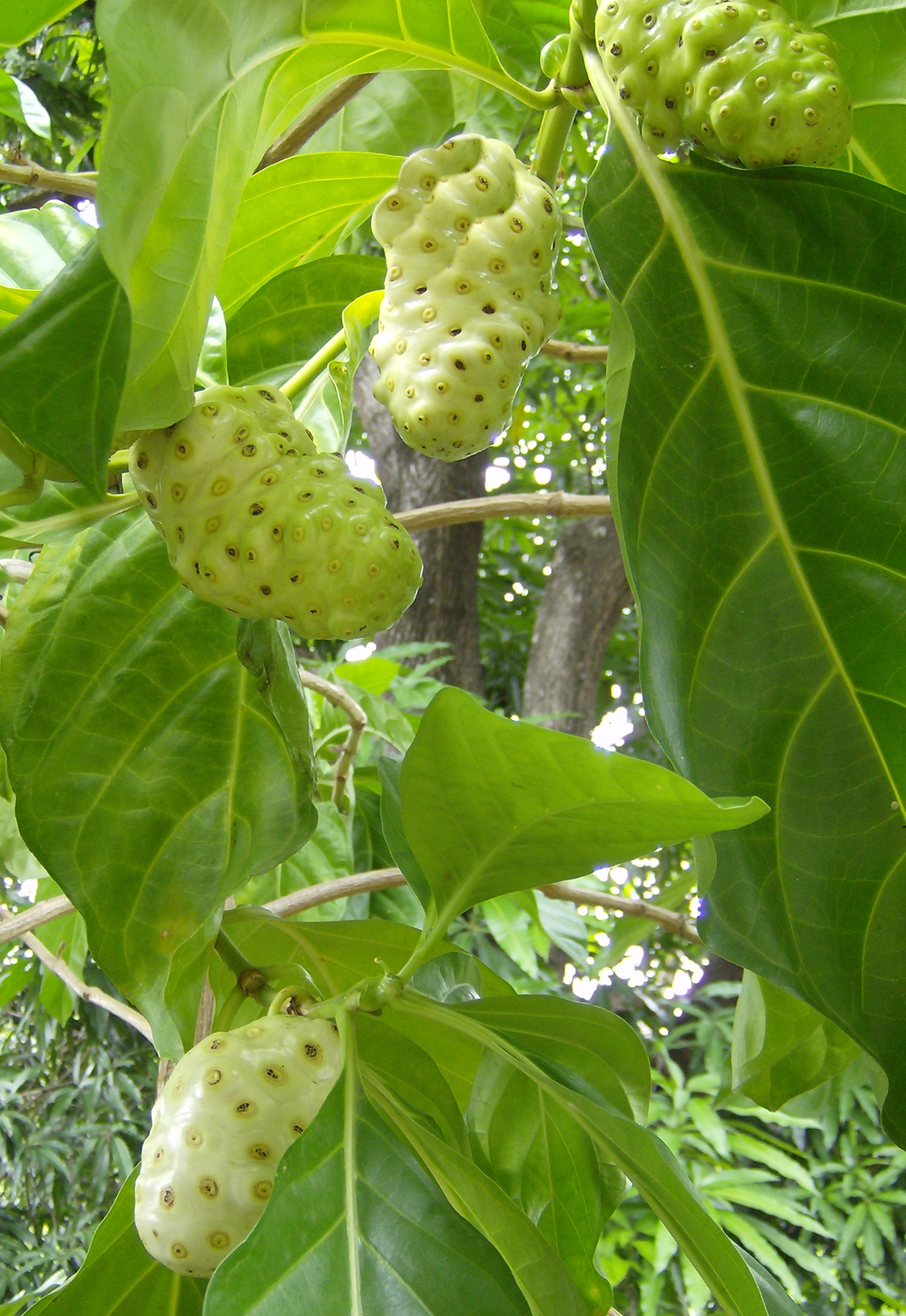
- Leaves and fruit

Conservation status
- Least Concern (IUCN 3.1)

Scientific classification
- Kingdom: Plantae
- Clade: Tracheophytes
- Clade: Angiosperms
- Clade: Eudicots
- Clade: Asterids
- Order: Gentianales
- Family: Rubiaceae
- Genus: Morinda
- Species: M. citrifolia

Binomial name
- Morinda citrifolia L.

Synonyms
- 16 synonyms: Samama citrifolia (L.) Kuntze; Morinda citrifolia f. potteri (O.Deg.) H.St.John; Morinda citrifolia var. potteri O.Deg.; Morinda ligulata Blanco; Morinda litoralis Blanco; Morinda macrophylla Desf.; Morinda mudia Buch.-Ham.; Morinda multiflora Roxb.; Morinda nodosa Buch.-Ham.; Morinda quadrangularis G.Don; Morinda teysmanniana Miq.; Morinda tinctoria Noronha; Morinda tinctoria var. multiflora (Roxb.) Hook.f.; Morinda zollingeriana Miq.; Platanocephalus orientalis Crantz; Sarcocephalus leichhardtii F.Muell.

= Morinda citrifolia =

Species of plant

Morinda citrifolia is a fruit-bearing tree in the coffee family, Rubiaceae. It is commonly known as noni or Indian mulberry, among many other names.

Native to Southeast Asia and Australasia, the species was spread across the Pacific by Polynesian sailors. It is now cultivated throughout the tropics and is widely naturalised.

The plant contains anthraquinones, which can be harmful to human health. Although the fresh fruit is edible, its pungent odour makes it worthwhile only as a famine food. It is also used in traditional medicine and processed into products such as juices.

== Description ==
Fruit in cross-section

Morinda citrifolia is a shrub or small tree up to 6 metres (19 1/2 ft) tall, with grey-brown bark. The twigs are more or less square in cross-section and often fleshy. Stipules are present, very broad and obtuse at the apex, measuring up to 2 centimetres (3/4 in) wide and long. The large glabrous leaves are arranged in opposite pairs on the twigs, reaching up to 25 cm (10 in) long by 13 cm wide. They are elliptic to ovate in shape and have 6–9 pairs of lateral veins. Domatia are usually present as dense tufts of hairs in the junctions of the lateral veins with the midrib.

The inflorescences are dense heads of flowers produced at the apex of the branch. They are leaf-opposed, replacing one leaf in the pair. There may be up to 90–100 flowers in the head, but only a few open at a time. The flowers are white and tubular with five lobes, measuring about 15 cm long and across.

The fruit is a multiple fruit consisting of fused drupes, each containing four seeds. They are initially green, transitioning through pale yellow to white or grey, and when ripe they emit a pungent odour similar to blue cheese. They are irregularly ellipsoid or ovoid, and may reach up to 9x6 cm.

=== Phenology ===
The plants flower and fruit throughout the year. It is common to see flowers and fruit in varying stages of development on a plant at any given time.

=== Chemistry ===
Morinda citrifolia fruit contains diverse phytochemicals, including anthraquinones, lignans, oligo- and polysaccharides, flavonoids, iridoids, such as deacetylasperulosidic acid, fatty acids, scopoletin, catechin, beta-sitosterol, damnacanthal, and alkaloids.

== Distribution and habitat ==
Native to Southeast Asia and Australasia, the species was spread across the Pacific by Polynesian sailors. It is now cultivated throughout the tropics and is widely naturalised.

Morinda citrifolia grows in shady forests and on open rocky or sandy shores. It takes 18 months for the plant to mature, and yields 4 to 8 kg (8.8 to 17.6 lb) of fruit per month throughout the year. It is tolerant of saline soils, drought conditions, and secondary soils. It can be found in various environments including volcanic terrains and clearings or limestone outcrops, as well as in coral atolls. It can grow up to 9 m (30 ft) tall and has large, simple, dark green, shiny, and deeply veined leaves.

== Ecology ==
Morinda citrifolia is attractive to weaver ants, which make their nests by using the leaves of this tree. These ants protect the plant from some plant-parasitic insects. The smell of the fruit also attracts fruit bats, which aid in dispersing the seeds. Drosophila sechellia, a type of fruit fly endemic to the Seychelles, feeds exclusively on these fruits.

== Health concerns ==
Consumption of M. citrifolia products, such as supplements, beverages, powders, oils or leaves, has the risk of causing liver disease through exposure to anthraquinones.

== Uses ==
A variety of beverages (juice drinks), powders (from dried ripe or unripe fruits), cosmetic products (lotions, soaps), oil (from seeds), and leaf powders (for encapsulation or pills) have been introduced into the consumer market.

=== Culinary ===
Indigenous peoples used the fruit as emergency food during famines. Therefore, it is also called "starvation fruit". Despite its strong smell and bitter taste, the fruit was nevertheless eaten as a famine food, and, in some Pacific Islands, even as a staple food, either raw or cooked. Southeast Asians and Aboriginal Australians consume fresh fruit with salt or cook it with curry. The seeds are edible when roasted. In Thai cuisine, the leaves known as bai-yo are used as a leaf vegetable and are the main ingredient of Kaeng bai-yo, cooked with coconut milk. The fruit luk-yo is added as a salad ingredient to some versions of green papaya salad.

In Cambodia, the leaves are an essential part of the national dish fish amok.

The fruit powder contains carbohydrates and dietary fibre in moderate amounts. These macronutrients reside in the fruit pulp, as M. citrifolia juice has sparse nutrient content.

=== Traditional medicine ===
Green fruit, leaves, and root or rhizomes might have been used in Polynesian cultures as a general tonic, in addition to its traditional place in Polynesian culture as a famine food. Although Morinda is considered to have biological properties in traditional medicine, there is no confirmed evidence of clinical efficacy for any intended use. In 2018, a Hawaiian manufacturer of food and skincare products based on this fruit was issued an FDA warning letter for marketing unapproved drugs and making false health claims in violation of the US Food, Drug, and Cosmetic Act.

=== Dyes ===
The fruit has traditionally been used by Austronesian peoples mainly for producing dyes. It was carried into the Pacific Islands as canoe plants by Austronesian voyagers. Morinda bark produces a brownish-purplish dye that may be used for making batik. In Hawaii, yellowish dye is extracted from its roots to dye cloth. Yolngu artists at Bula'Bula Arts in Ramingining, in central Arnhem Land in the Northern Territory, Australia, use the roots and bark of djundom, as it is known to them, to dye the fibres of pandanus to create a wide variety of artifacts.

Applying a mordant to the fabric before dyeing is necessary when using extracts of this plant as a dye. This process can be labor-intensive if the goal is to achieve shades and hues with the morinda dye.

== Gallery ==
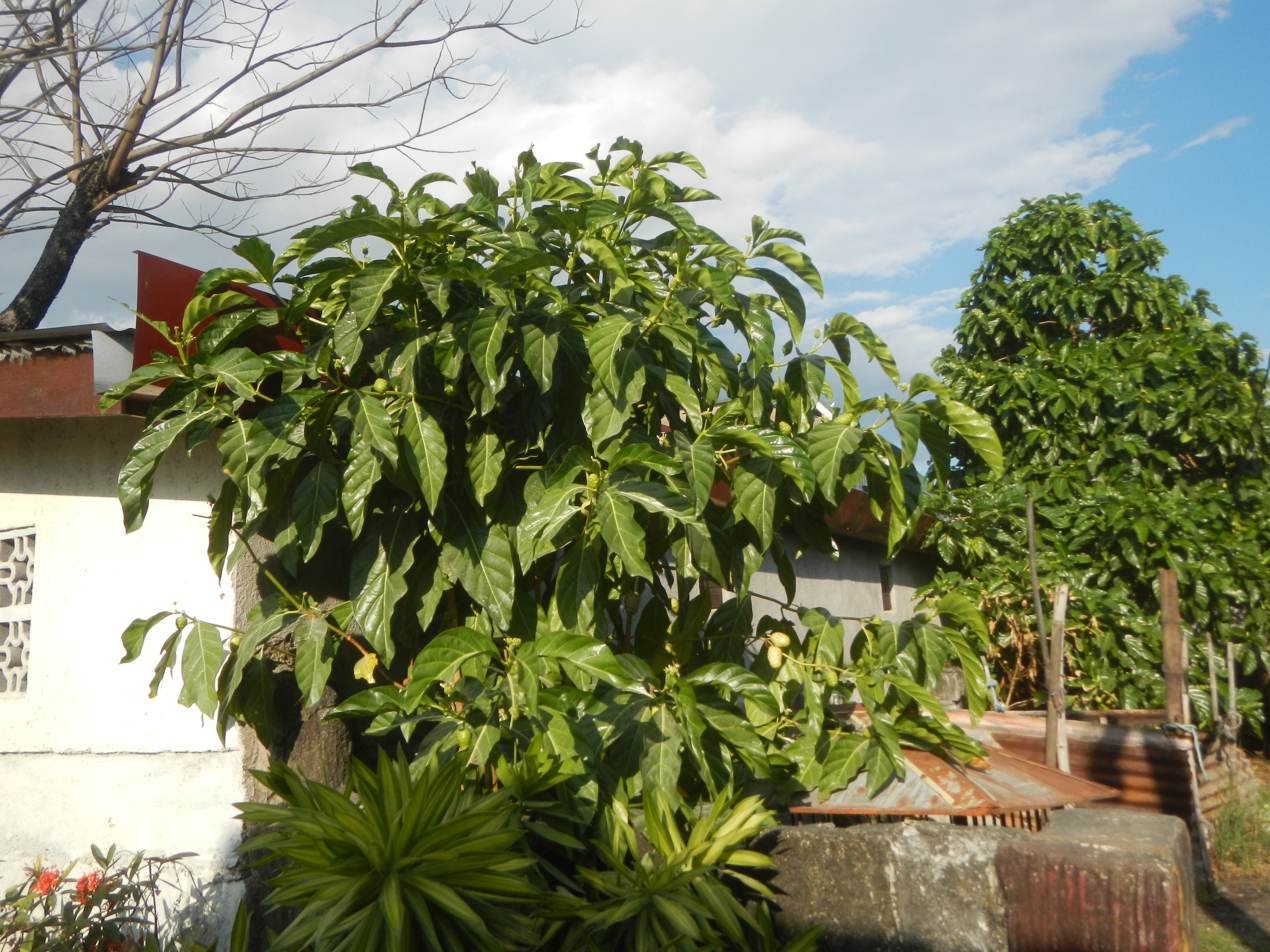
Residential habit

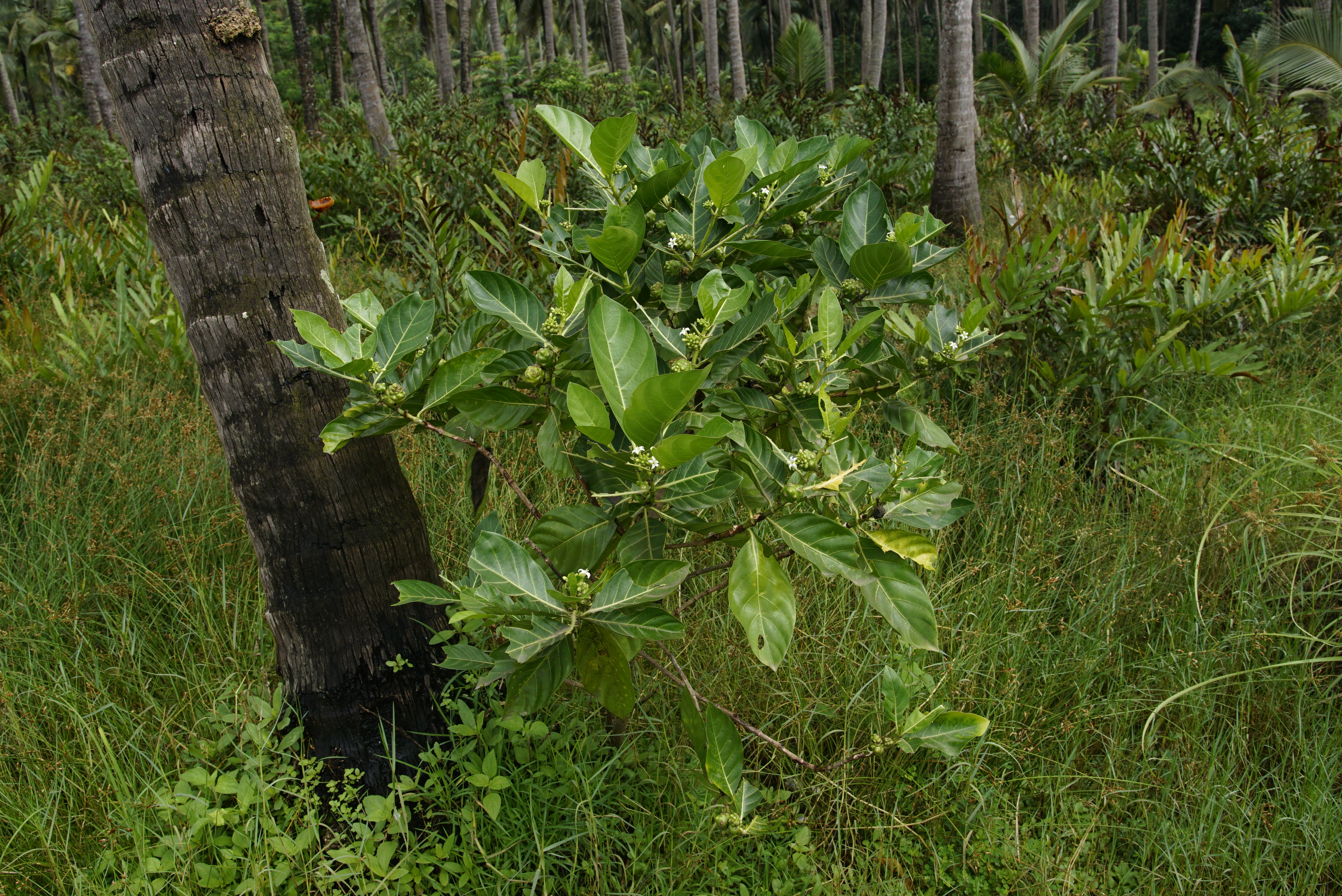
Sapling

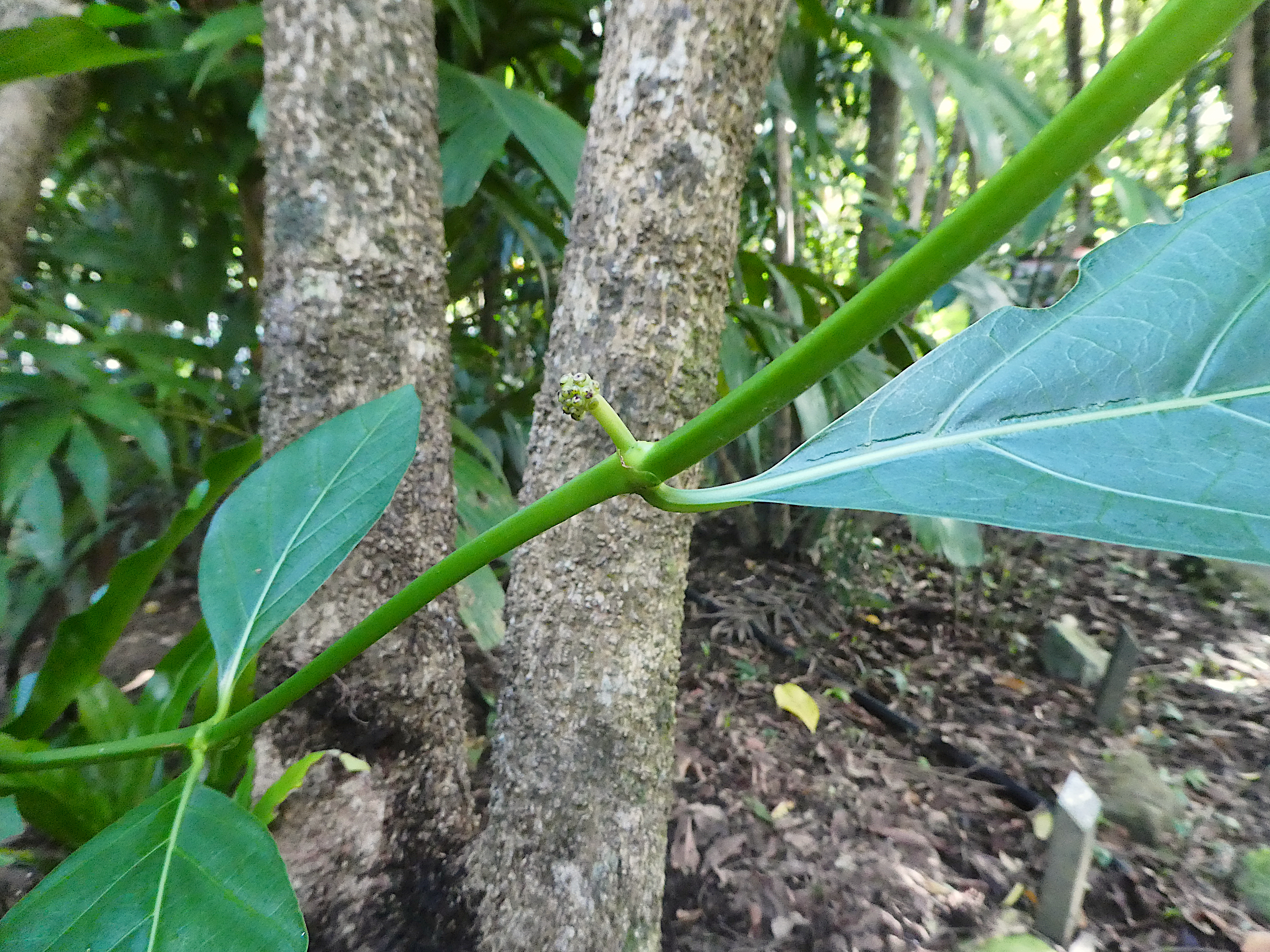
Budding inflorescence

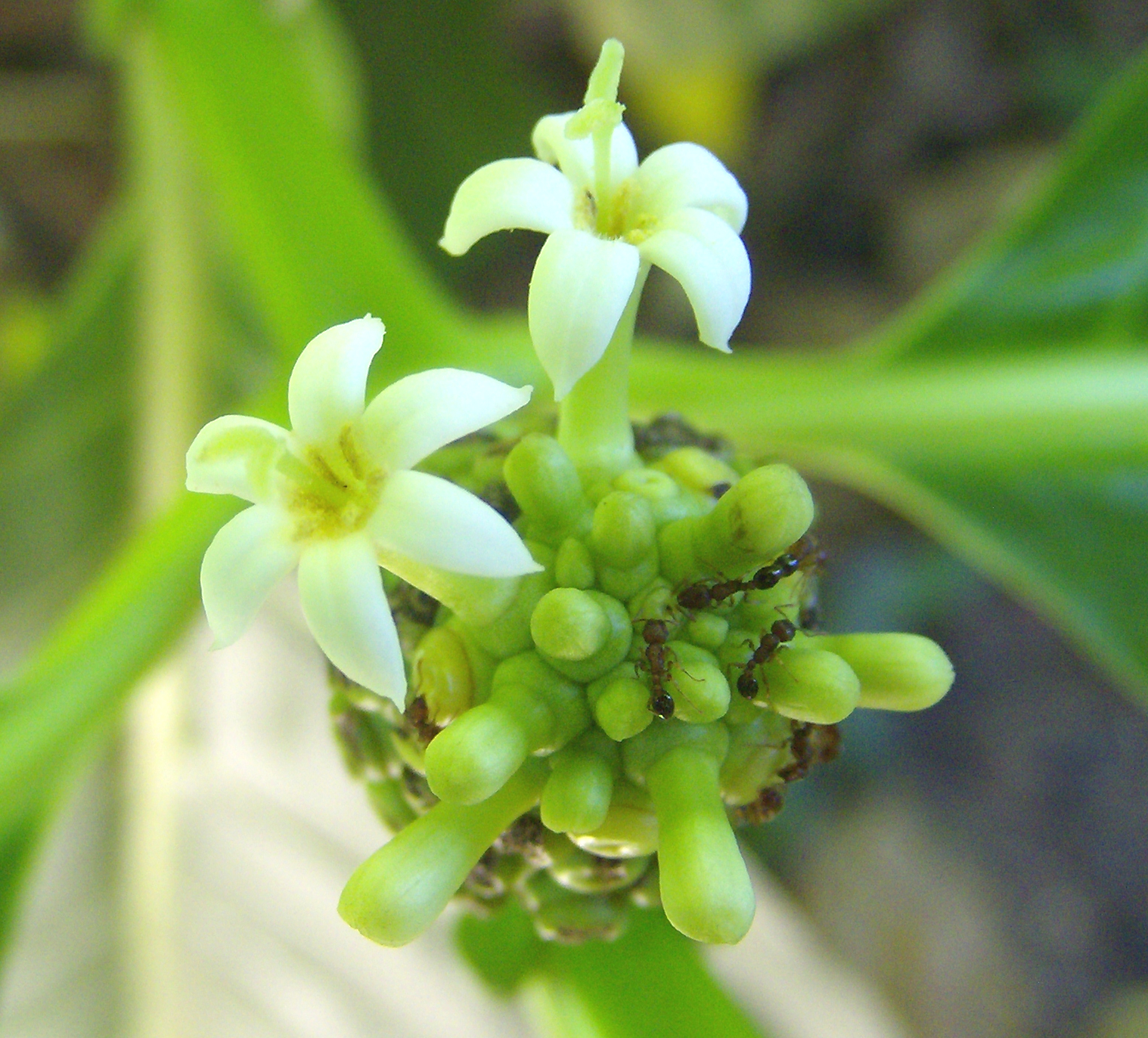
Flower with ants

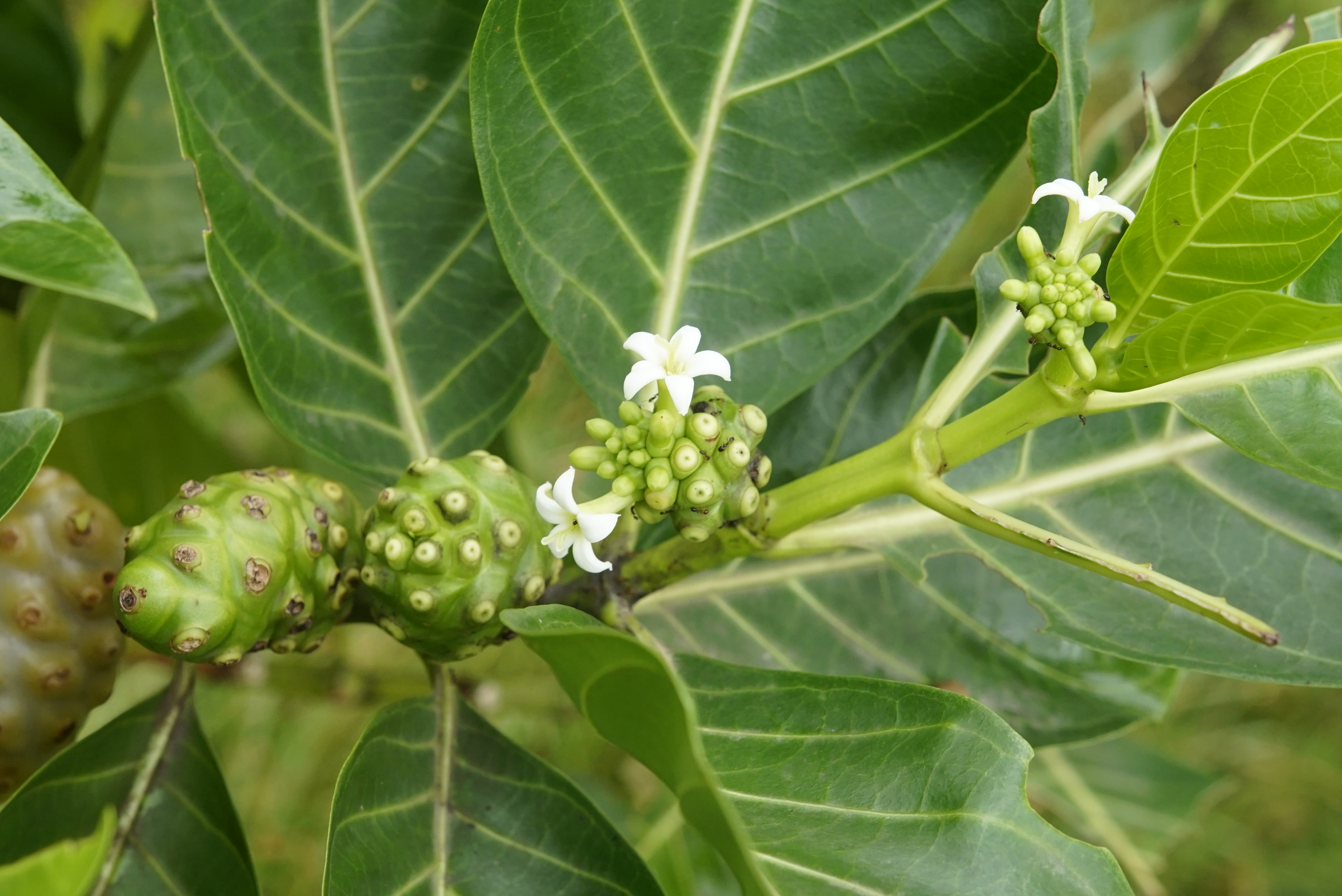
Fruit in varying stages of development

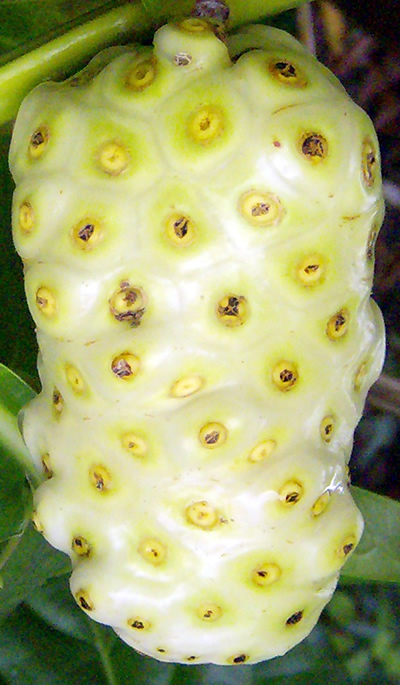
Ripe fruit

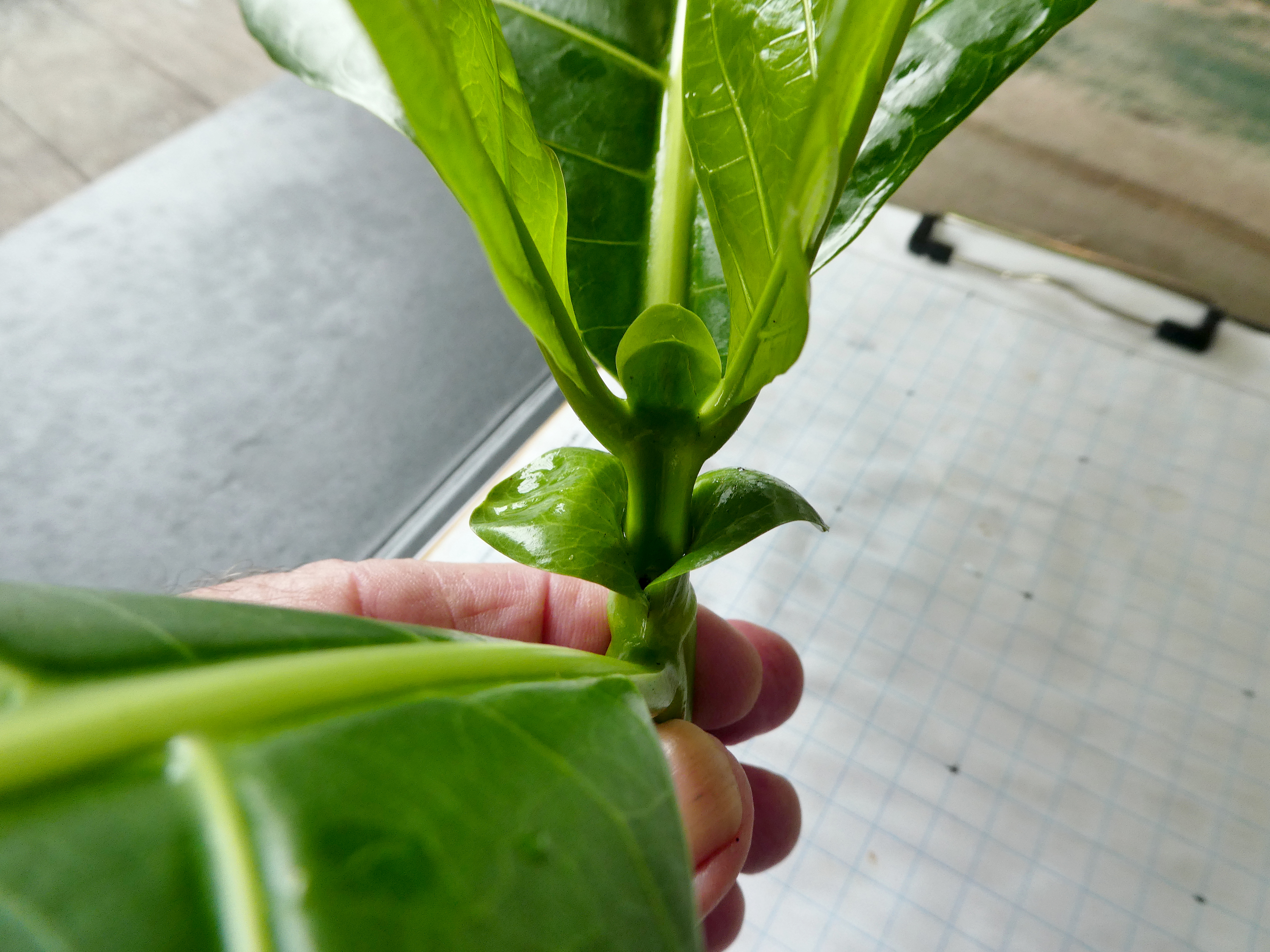
Close-up of the large stipules

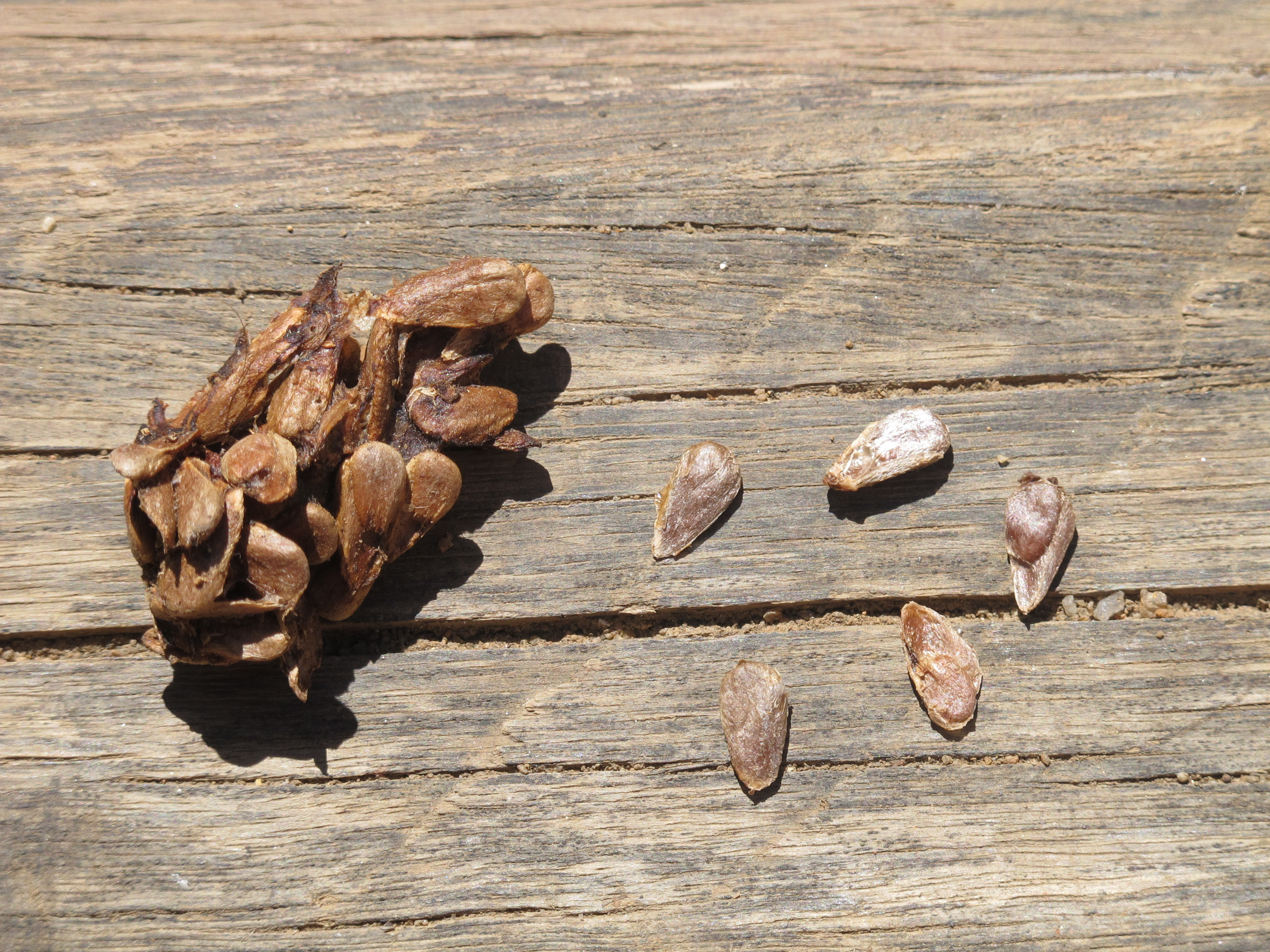
Seeds

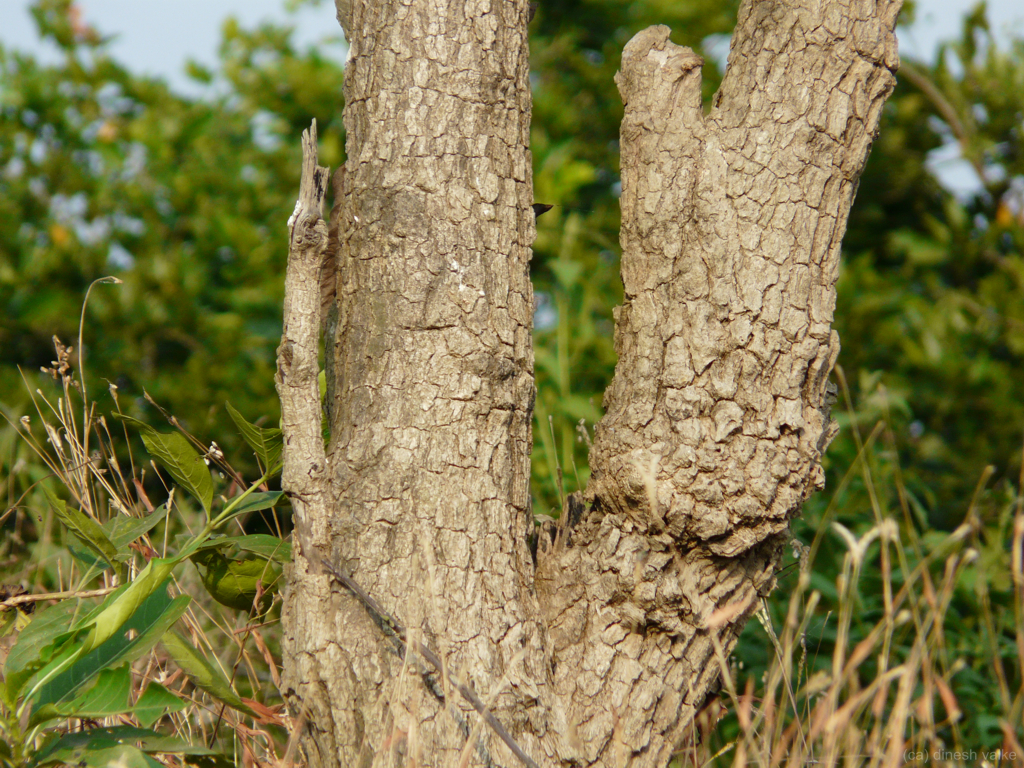
Trunk

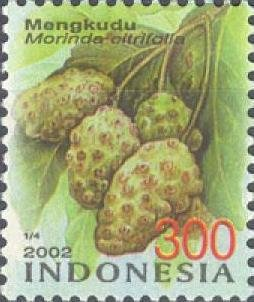
Postage stamp from Indonesia

== See also ==
- Noni juice
