= Pyridoxal =

Vitamin

- Skeletal formula of pyridoxal Idealised skeletal formula

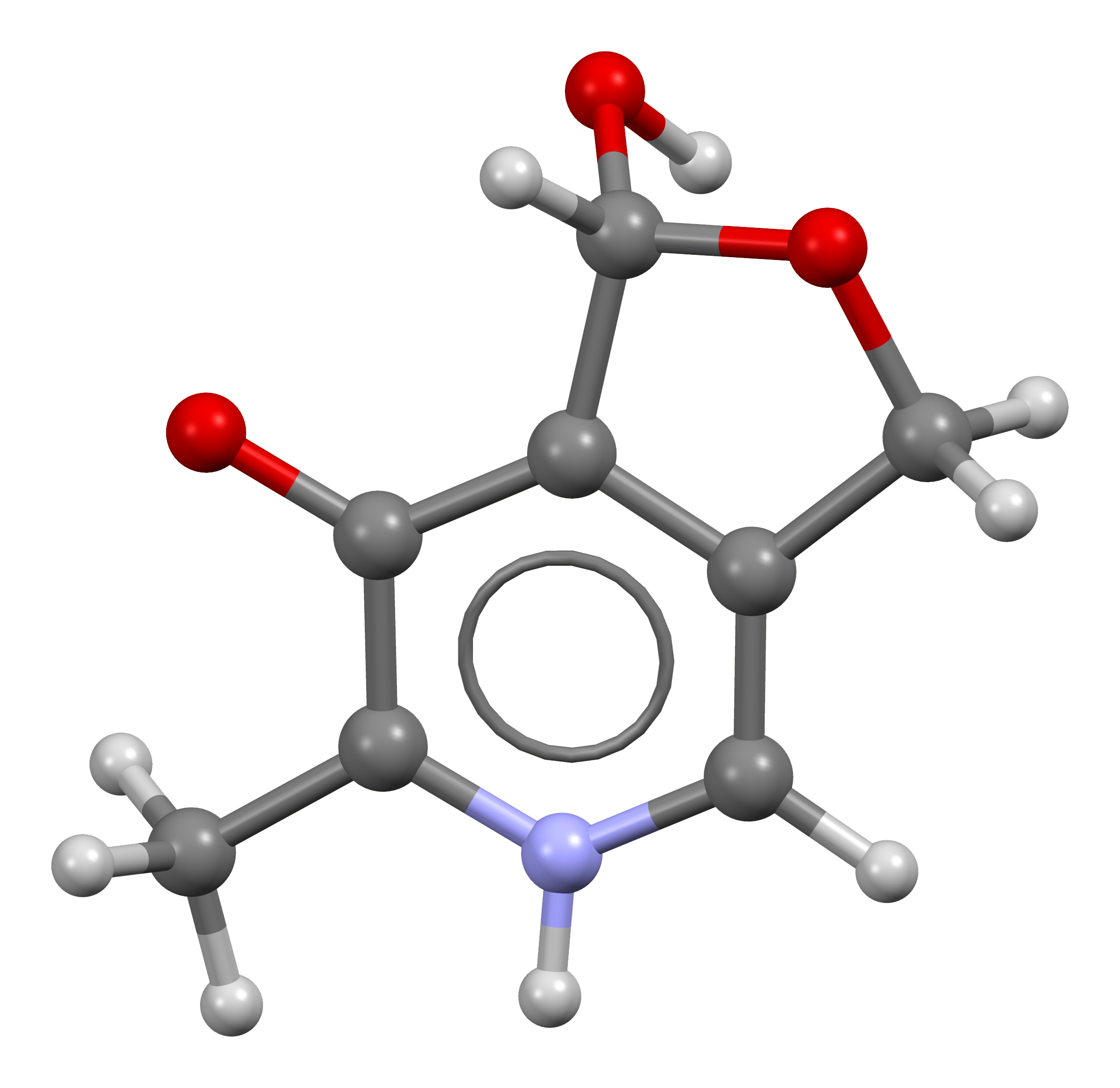
- Ball-and-stick model of pyridoxal Ball-and-stick model based on the crystal structure. Note that the acidic phenol group has donated a proton to the basic pyridine group to form a zwitterion, and the hydroxymethyl group has reacted with the aldehyde group to form a hemiacetal.

Names
- Preferred IUPAC name 3-Hydroxy-5-(hydroxymethyl)-2-methylpyridine-4-carbaldehyde

Identifiers
CAS Number	66-72-8; 65-22-5 (hydrochloride)
3D model (JSmol)	Interactive image
ChEBI	CHEBI:17310
ChEMBL	ChEMBL102970
ChemSpider	1021
DrugBank	DB00147
ECHA InfoCard	100.000.573
KEGG	C00250
PubChem CID	1050
UNII	3THM379K8A; 1416KF0QBC (hydrochloride)
CompTox Dashboard (EPA)	DTXSID4046020
- InChI: InChI=1S/C8H9NO3/c1-5-8(12)7(4-11)6(3-10)2-9-5/h2,4,10,12H,3H2,1H3 Key: RADKZDMFGJYCBB-UHFFFAOYSA-N; InChI=1/C8H9NO3/c1-5-8(12)7(4-11)6(3-10)2-9-5/h2,4,10,12H,3H2,1H3 Key: RADKZDMFGJYCBB-UHFFFAOYAP
- SMILES: O=Cc1c(O)c(C)ncc1CO

Properties
Chemical formula	C_{8}H_{9}NO_{3}
Molar mass	167.16 g/mol
Melting point	165 °C (329 °F; 438 K) (decomposes)

Related compounds
Related arylformaldehydes	Damnacanthal Gossypol
- Except where otherwise noted, data are given for materials in their standard state (at 25 °C [77 °F], 100 kPa). verify (what is ?) Infobox references

Pyridoxal (PL) is one form of vitamin B_{6}.

Some medically relevant bacteria, such as those in the genera Granulicatella and Abiotrophia, require pyridoxal for growth. This nutritional requirement can lead to the culture phenomenon of satellite growth. In in vitro culture, these pyridoxal-dependent bacteria may only grow in areas surrounding colonies of bacteria from other genera ("satellitism") that are capable of producing pyridoxal.

Pyridoxal is involved in what is believed to be the most ancient reaction of aerobic metabolism on Earth, about 2.9 billion years ago, a forerunner of the Great Oxidation Event.

== See also ==
- Pyridoxal phosphate
