= Granulicatella =

Scientific classification
- Domain: Bacteria
- Kingdom: Bacillati
- Phylum: Bacillota
- Class: Bacilli
- Order: Lactobacillales
- Family: Carnobacteriaceae
- Genus: Granulicatella; Collins and Lawson 2000

Species
- G. adiacens G. balaenopterae G. elegans G. paraadiacens G. seriolae

Genus of bacteria

Granulicatella is a genus of bacteria from the family of Carnobacteriaceae. These bacteria occurs in the upper respiratory tract, in the gastrointestinal tract, and the urogenital tract. Granulicatella bacteria can cause disease in humans in rare cases.
