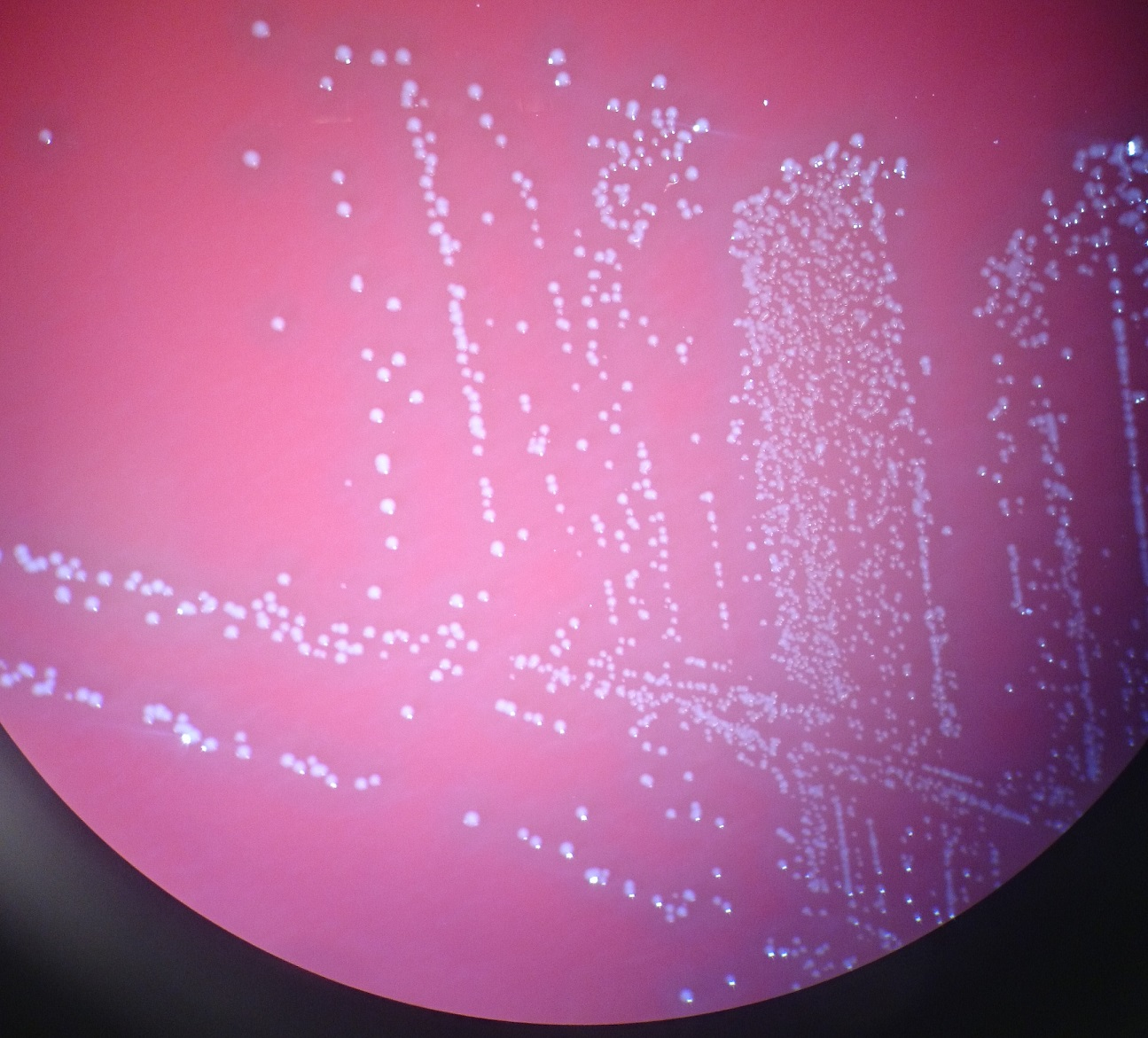

Scientific classification
- Domain: Bacteria
- Kingdom: Bacillati
- Phylum: Bacillota
- Class: Bacilli
- Order: Lactobacillales
- Family: Aerococcaceae; Ludwig, Schleifer & Whitman 2010

Genera
- See text

= Aerococcaceae =

Family of bacteria

Aerococcaceae, from Ancient Greek ἀήρ (aḗr), meaning "air", and κόκκος (kókkos), meaning "grain", are a family of Gram-positive lactic acid bacteria, including the bacterium that causes gaffkaemia in lobsters.

== Phylogeny ==
The currently accepted taxonomy is based on the List of Prokaryotic names with Standing in Nomenclature (LPSN) and National Center for Biotechnology Information (NCBI).

16S rRNA based LTP_10_2024

- - - Aerococcaceae
      Aerococcus
  - - - Aerococcaceae~
        - Dolosicoccus
        - - Abiotrophia
          - - Globicatella
            - - - Eremococcus
                - Fundicoccus
              - - Facklamia
                - - - Hutsoniella
                    - - Ignavigranum
                      - Suicoccus
                  - - Falseniella
                    - Ruoffia
    - - - Carnobacteriaceae~
          - - Atopobacter
            - Bavariicoccus
          - Granulicatella
      - - - Carnobacteriaceae~1
            - Jeotgalibaca
            - Trichococcus
        - other

120 marker proteins based GTDB 09-RS220

- Aerococcaceae
  - - - Jeotgalibaca Lee et al. 2014
      - Trichococcus Scheff, Salcher & Lingens 1984
    - - - Atopobacter Lawson et al. 2000
        - Bavariicoccus Schmidt et al. 2009
      - Granulicatella Collins & Lawson 2000
  - - Aerococcus Williams, Hirch & Cowan 1953
    - - Dolosicoccus Collins et al. 1999
      - - - - Eremococcus Collins et al. 1999
            - - Hutsoniella Fotedar et al. 2021
              - Suicoccus Li et al. 2019
          - - Ignavigranum Collins et al. 1999
            - - Falseniella Fotedar et al. 2021
              - Ruoffia Fotedar et al. 2021
        - - Facklamia Collins et al. 1997
          - - Fundicoccus Siebert et al. 2020
            - - Globicatella Collins et al. 1995
              - - "Vaginisenegalia" Lo et al. 2019
                - Abiotrophia Kawamura et al. 1995

== See also ==
- List of Bacteria genera
- List of bacterial orders
