= Carnobacteriaceae =

Scientific classification
- Domain: Bacteria
- Kingdom: Bacillati
- Phylum: Bacillota
- Class: Bacilli
- Order: Lactobacillales
- Family: Carnobacteriaceae; Ludwig, Schleifer & Whitman 2010

Genera
- See text

Synonyms
- "Alkalibacteriaceae" Orla-Jensen 1909

Family of bacteria

The Carnobacteriaceae are a family of Gram-positive lactic acid bacteria.

== Phylogeny ==
The currently accepted taxonomy is based on the List of Prokaryotic names with Standing in Nomenclature (LPSN) and National Center for Biotechnology Information (NCBI).

16S rRNA based LTP_10_2024

- - Aerococcaceae
  - - Aerococcaceae~
    - - - Carnobacteriaceae~
          - - Atopobacter
            - Bavariicoccus
          - Granulicatella
      - - - Carnobacteriaceae~1
            - Jeotgalibaca
            - Trichococcus
        - - - Carnobacteriaceae~2
              - - Atopococcus
                - Lacticigenium
              - - - Allofustis
                  - Atopostipes
                - - - Alloiococcus
                    - Dolosigranulum
                  - - Marinilactibacillus
                    - Alkalibacterium
          - - - Carnobacteriaceae
                - - Desemzia
                  - Pisciglobus
                - - - Isobaculum
                    - Carnobacterium
                  - Carnobacterium~
            - other

120 marker proteins based GTDB 09-RS220

- - Aerococcaceae
    - - - - Atopobacter Lawson et al. 2000
          - Bavariicoccus Schmidt et al. 2009
        - Granulicatella Collins & Lawson 2000
      - - Jeotgalibaca Lee et al. 2014
        - Trichococcus Scheff, Salcher & Lingens 1984
    - other
  - Carnobacteriaceae
    - - - Atopococcus Collins et al. 2005
        - Lacticigenium corrig. Iino, Suzuki & Harayama 2009
      - - - - Alloiococcus Aguirre & Collins 1992
            - Dolosigranulum Aguirre et al. 1994
          - - Allofustis Collins et al. 2003
            - Atopostipes Cotta et al. 2004
        - - Marinilactibacillus Ishikawa et al. 2003
          - Alkalibacterium Ntougias & Russell 2001
    - - - Desemzia Stackebrandt et al. 1999
        - Pisciglobus Tanasupawat et al. 2011
      - - - Isobaculum Collins et al. 2002
          - Carnobacterium Collins et al. 1987
        - Carnobacterium_A

== See also ==
- List of Bacteria genera
- List of bacterial orders
