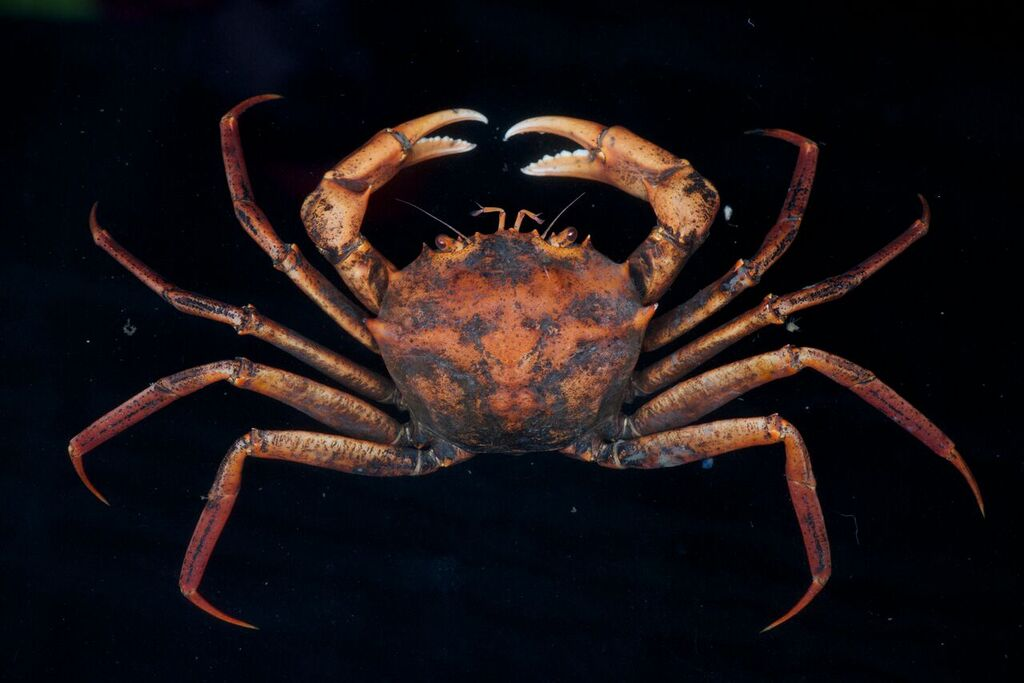

Scientific classification
- Kingdom: Animalia
- Phylum: Arthropoda
- Class: Malacostraca
- Order: Decapoda
- Suborder: Pleocyemata
- Infraorder: Brachyura
- Family: Geryonidae
- Genus: Geryon
- Species: G. trispinosus

Binomial name
- Geryon trispinosus (Herbst, 1803)

Synonyms
- Cancer trispinosus Herbst, 1803; Cancer tridens Herbst, 1790 (suppressed); Cancer tridens Fabricius, 1798

= Geryon trispinosus =

Species of crab

Geryon trispinosus is a species of crab that lives in deep water in the north-eastern Atlantic Ocean.

== Description ==
Geryon trispinosus is a small crab, reaching a carapace length of up to 40 millimetres (1.6 in). The carapace is roughly hexagonal in shape, and reddish brown in colour. It is broader than it is long, with three conspicuous teeth on either side at the front. The pereiopods are paler than the carapace; they are quite narrow and long, with the third and fourth pairs being the longest.

== Distribution ==
Geryon trispinosus is found in the north-eastern Atlantic Ocean. Its range extends from Norway in the north to the Bay of Biscay in the south, and also includes the Canary Islands.

== Life cycle and ecology ==
Females reach sexual maturity at a carapace length of 12–15 mm (0.5–0.6 in), while males reach it at 35 mm (1.4 in). Eggs are laid in April, and the eggs hatch into planktonic larvae, which eventually settle as juveniles at depths greater than 1,000 metres (3,300 ft). As they grow, these crabs migrate upwards, with the adults only found at depths of less than 800 m (2,600 ft). Due to the shallow slopes in the north-eastern Atlantic, these migrations involve distances of 20–50 kilometres (12–31 mi).

Geryon trispinosus occurs in the same localities as the squat lobster Munida sarsi. M. sarsi lives abundantly at depths of 700–800 metres (2,300–2,600 ft), and out-competes young G. trispinosus, and limits their survival to those depths where it is absent. Another squat lobster, M. tenuimana, lives at greater depths, but in much lower numbers, and therefore does not impact the survival of G. trispinosus as severely.

== Taxonomy ==
Geryon trispinosus was first described in 1803 by Johann Friedrich Wilhelm Herbst, as "Cancer trispinosus", although he described the locality erroneously as the East Indies. In 1837, Henrik Nikolai Krøyer erected the genus Geryon, setting "Geryon tridens" as the type species. This was later synonymised with Herbst's species. In 1989, Raymond B. Manning and Lipke Holthuis erected a new genus, Chaceon, to accommodate most of the species previously in Geryon, which was left with only two species, G. trispinosus and G. longipes from the Mediterranean Sea.
