= Chaceon bicolor =

Scientific classification
- Domain: Eukaryota
- Kingdom: Animalia
- Phylum: Arthropoda
- Class: Malacostraca
- Order: Decapoda
- Suborder: Pleocyemata
- Infraorder: Brachyura
- Family: Geryonidae
- Genus: Chaceon
- Species: C. bicolor

Binomial name
- Chaceon bicolor (Manning & Holthuis, 1989)

Species of crab

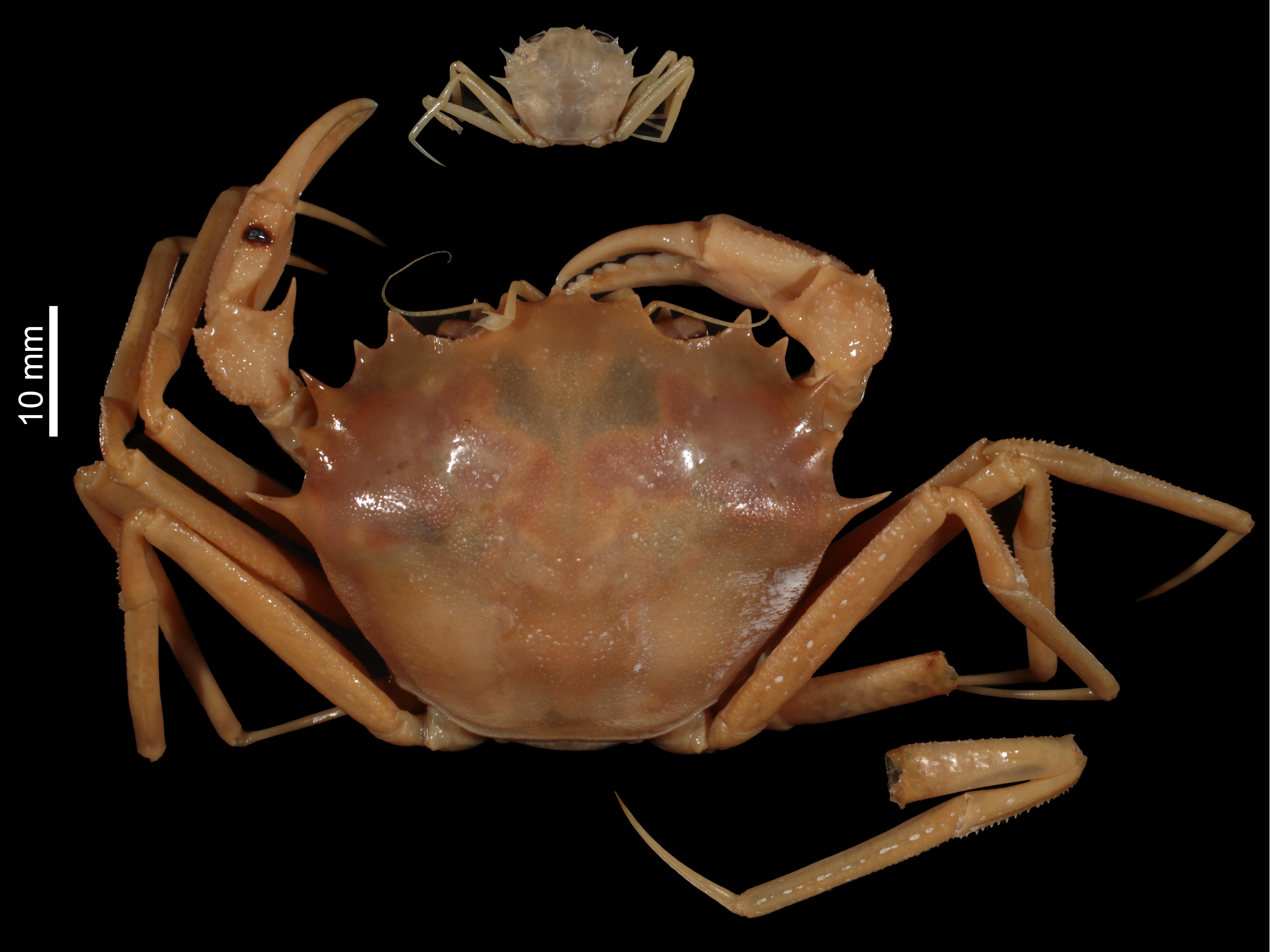
Chaceon bicolor

Chaceon bicolor is a species of crab.
