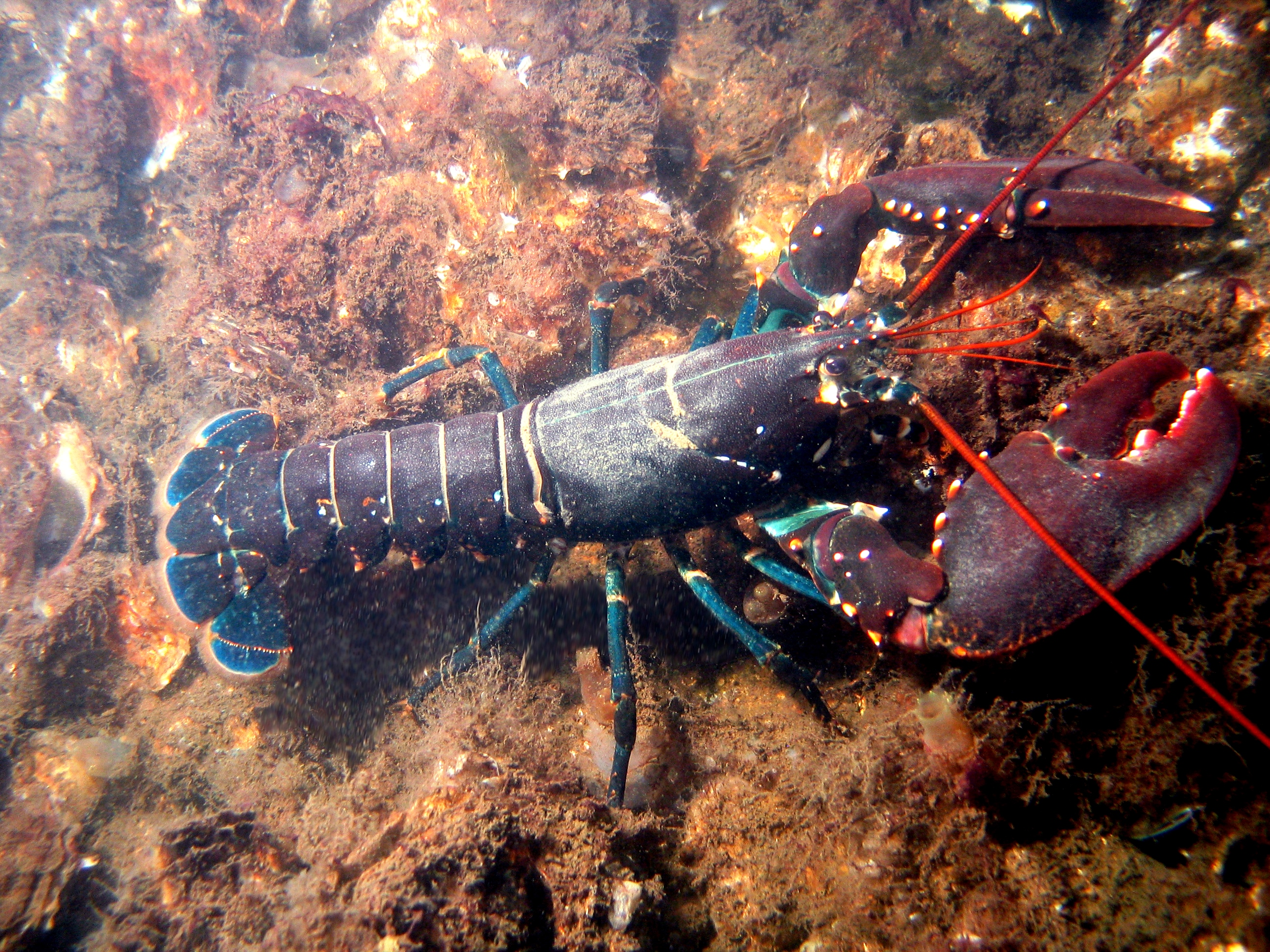

Conservation status
- Least Concern (IUCN 3.1)

Scientific classification
- Kingdom: Animalia
- Phylum: Arthropoda
- Clade: Pancrustacea
- Class: Malacostraca
- Order: Decapoda
- Suborder: Pleocyemata
- Family: Nephropidae
- Genus: Homarus
- Species: H. gammarus

Binomial name
- Homarus gammarus (Linnaeus, 1758)

Synonyms
- Cancer gammarus Linnaeus, 1758; Astacus marinus Fabricius, 1775; Astacus gammarus Pennant, 1777; Homarus marinus Weber, 1795; Astacus europaeus Couch, 1837; Homarus vulgaris H. Milne-Edwards, 1837

= Homarus gammarus =

European lobster of the eastern Atlantic and Mediterranean

Homarus gammarus, known as the European lobster or common lobster, is a species of clawed lobster from the eastern Atlantic Ocean, Mediterranean Sea and parts of the Black Sea. It is closely related to the American lobster, H. americanus. It may grow to a length of 60 cm (24 in) and a mass of 6 kilograms (13 lb), and bears a conspicuous pair of claws. In life, the lobsters are blue, only becoming "lobster red" on cooking. Mating occurs in the summer, producing eggs which are carried by the females for up to a year before hatching into planktonic larvae. Homarus gammarus is a source of highly esteemed foodstuff, and is widely caught using lobster pots, mostly around the British Isles.

== Description ==
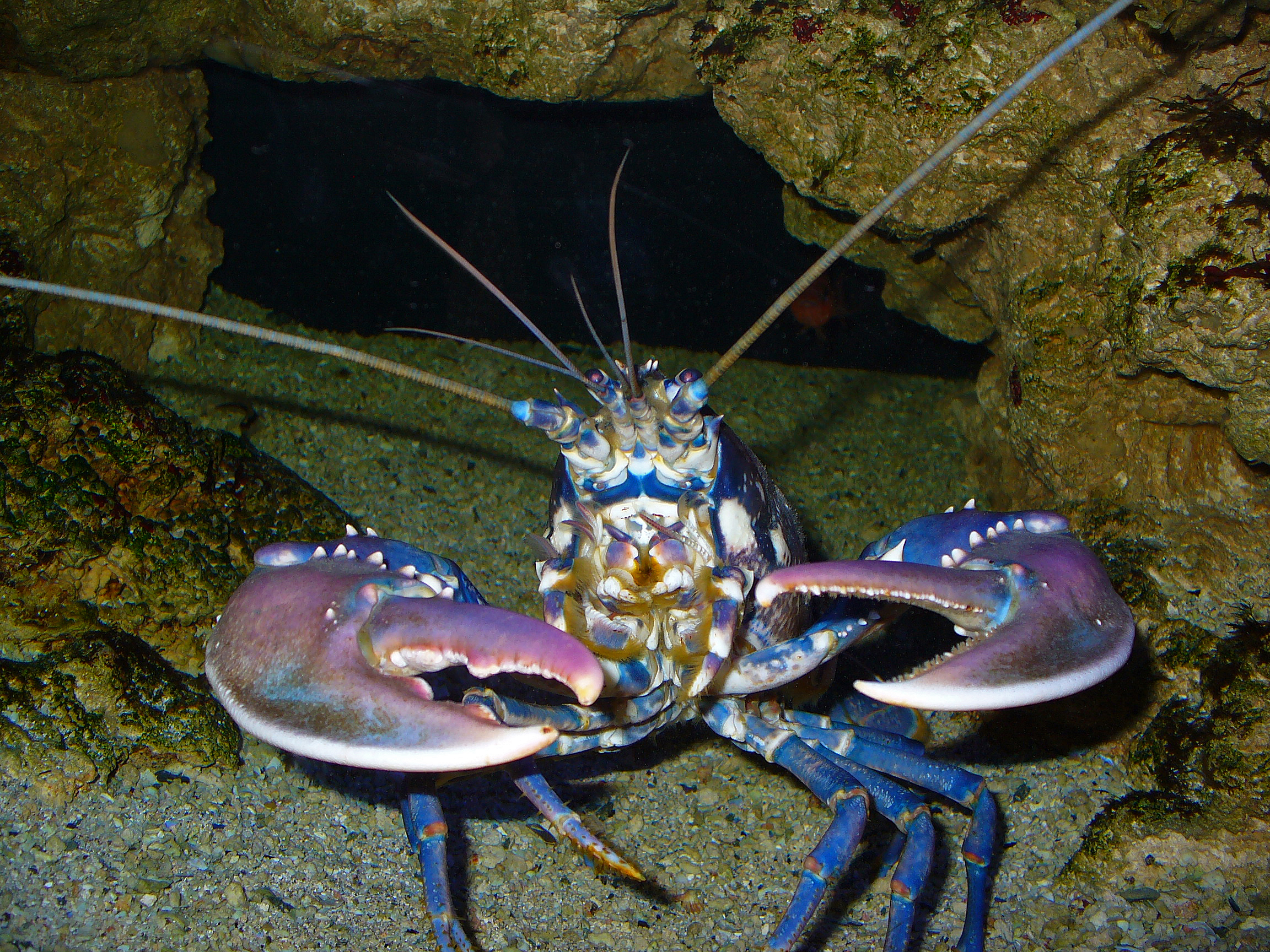
On this European lobster, the right claw (on the left side of the image) is the crusher and the left claw is the cutter.

Homarus gammarus is a large crustacean, with a body length up to 60 centimetres (24 in) and weighing up to 5–6 kilograms (11–13 lb), although the lobsters caught in lobster pots are usually 23–38 cm (9–15 in) long and weigh 0.7–2.2 kg (1.5–4.9 lb). Like other crustaceans, lobsters have a hard exoskeleton which they must shed in order to grow, in a process called ecdysis (molting). This may occur several times a year for young lobsters, but decreases to once every 1–2 years for larger animals.

The first pair of pereiopods is armed with a large, asymmetrical pair of feet. The larger one is the "crusher", and has rounded nodules used for crushing prey; the other is the "cutter", which has sharp inner edges, and is used for holding or tearing the prey. Usually, the left claw is the crusher, and the right is the cutter.

The exoskeleton is generally blue above, with spots that coalesce, and yellow below. The red colour associated with lobsters only appears after cooking. This occurs because, in life, the red pigment astaxanthin is bound to a protein complex, but the complex is broken up by the heat of cooking, releasing the red pigment.

The closest relative of H. gammarus is the American lobster, Homarus americanus. The two species are very similar, and can be crossed artificially, although hybrids are unlikely to occur in the wild since their ranges do not overlap. The two species can be distinguished by a number of characteristics:

- The rostrum of H. americanus bears one or more spines on the underside, which are lacking in H. gammarus.
- The spines on the claws of H. americanus are red or red-tipped, while those of H. gammarus are white or white-tipped.
- The underside of the claw of H. americanus is orange or red, while that of H. gammarus is creamy white or very pale red.

== Life cycle ==
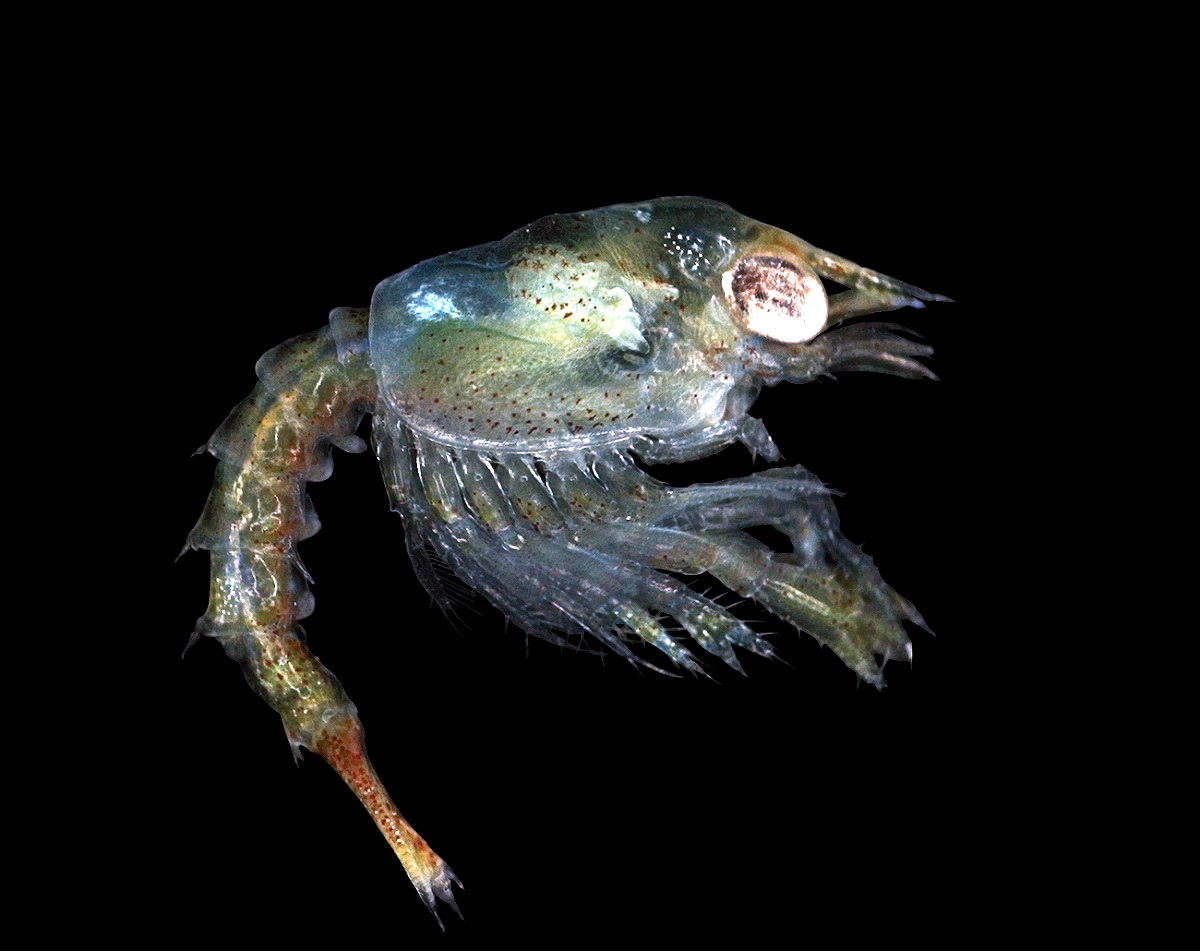
Zoea larva of Homarus gammarus

Female H. gammarus reach sexual maturity when they have grown to a carapace length of 80–85 millimetres (3.1–3.3 in), whereas males mature at a slightly smaller size. Mating typically occurs in summer between a recently moulted female, whose shell is therefore soft, and a hard-shelled male. The female carries the eggs attached to her pleopods for up to 12 months, depending on the temperature. Females carrying eggs are said to be "berried" and can be found throughout the year.

The eggs hatch at night, and the larvae swim to the water surface where they drift with the ocean currents, preying on zooplankton. This stage involves three moults and lasts for 15–35 days. After the third moult, the juvenile takes on a form closer to the adult, and adopts a benthic lifestyle. The juveniles are rarely seen in the wild, and are poorly known, although they are known to be capable of digging extensive burrows. It is estimated that only 1 larva in every 20,000 survives to the benthic phase. When they reach a carapace length of 15 mm (0.59 in), the juveniles leave their burrows and start their adult lives.

== Distribution ==
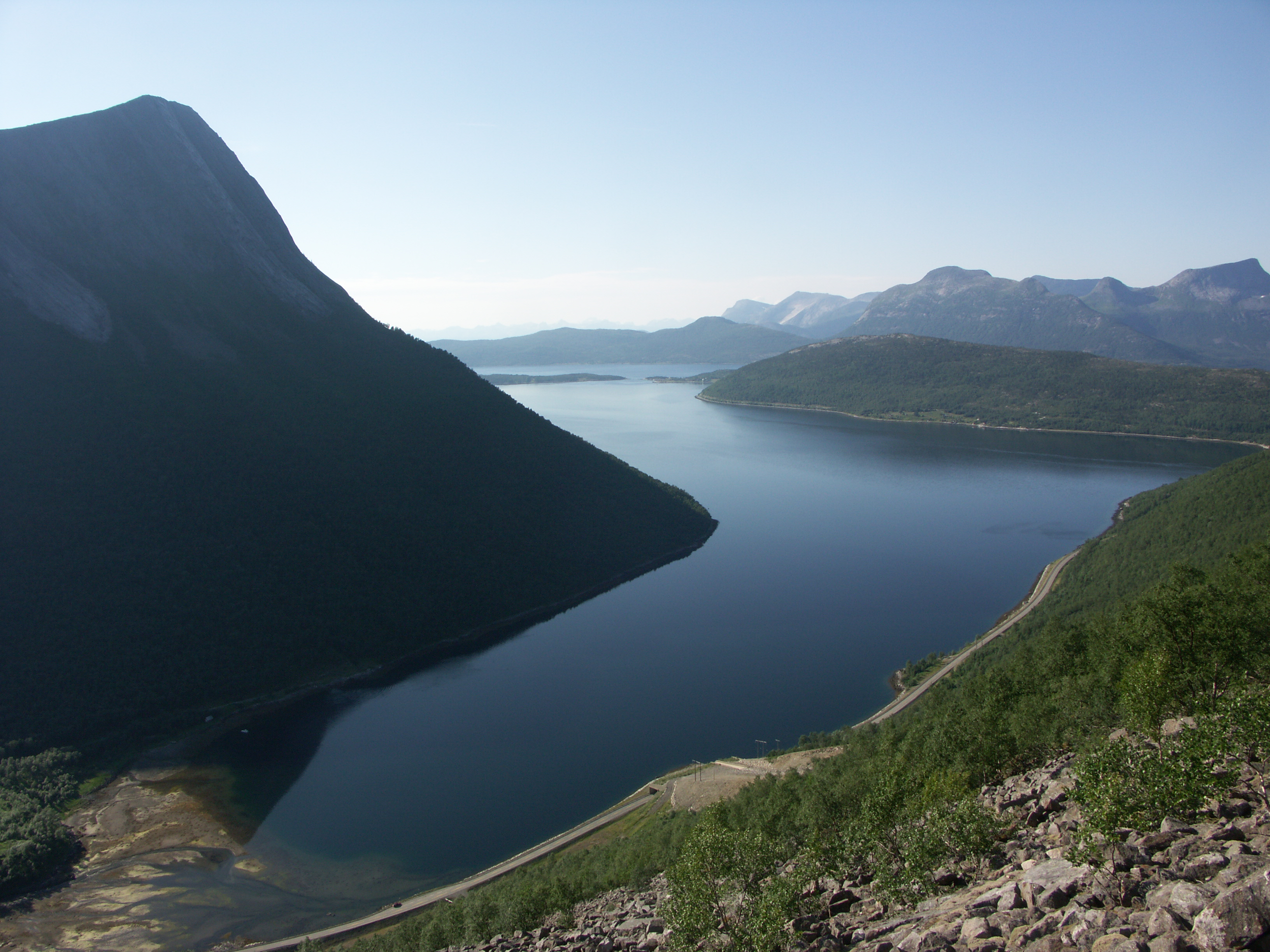
Tysfjorden, along with neighbouring fjords in Northern Norway, is home to the world's northernmost populations of H. gammarus.

Homarus gammarus is found across the north-eastern Atlantic Ocean from northern Norway to the Azores and Morocco, not including the Baltic Sea. It is also present in most of the Mediterranean Sea, only missing from the section east of Crete, and along only the south-west coast of the Black Sea. The northernmost populations are found in the Norwegian fjords Tysfjorden and Nordfolda, inside the Arctic Circle.

The species can be divided into four genetically distinct populations, one widespread population, and three which have diverged due to small effective population sizes, possibly due to adaptation to the local environment. The first of these is the population of lobsters from northern Norway, which have been referred to as the "midnight-sun lobster". The populations in the Mediterranean Sea are distinct from those in the Atlantic Ocean. The last distinct population is found in part of the Netherlands: samples from the Oosterschelde were distinct from those collected in the North Sea or English Channel.

Attempts have been made to introduce H. gammarus to New Zealand, alongside other European species such as the edible crab, Cancer pagurus. Between 1904 and 1914, one million lobster larvae were released from hatcheries in Dunedin, but the species did not become established there.

== Ecology ==
Adult H. gammarus live on the continental shelf at depths of 0–150 metres (0–492 ft), although not normally deeper than 50 m (160 ft). They prefer hard substrates, such as rocks or hard mud, and live in holes or crevices, emerging at night to feed.

The diet of H. gammarus mostly consists of other benthic invertebrates. These include crabs, molluscs, sea urchins, starfish and polychaete worms.

The three clawed-lobster species Homarus gammarus, H. americanus and Nephrops norvegicus are hosts to the three known species of the animal phylum Cycliophora; the species on H. gammarus has not been described.

Homarus gammarus is susceptible to the disease gaffkaemia, caused by the bacterium Aerococcus viridans. Although it is frequently found in American lobsters, the disease has only been seen in captive H. gammarus, where prior occupation of the tanks by H. americanus could not be ruled out.

== Human consumption ==
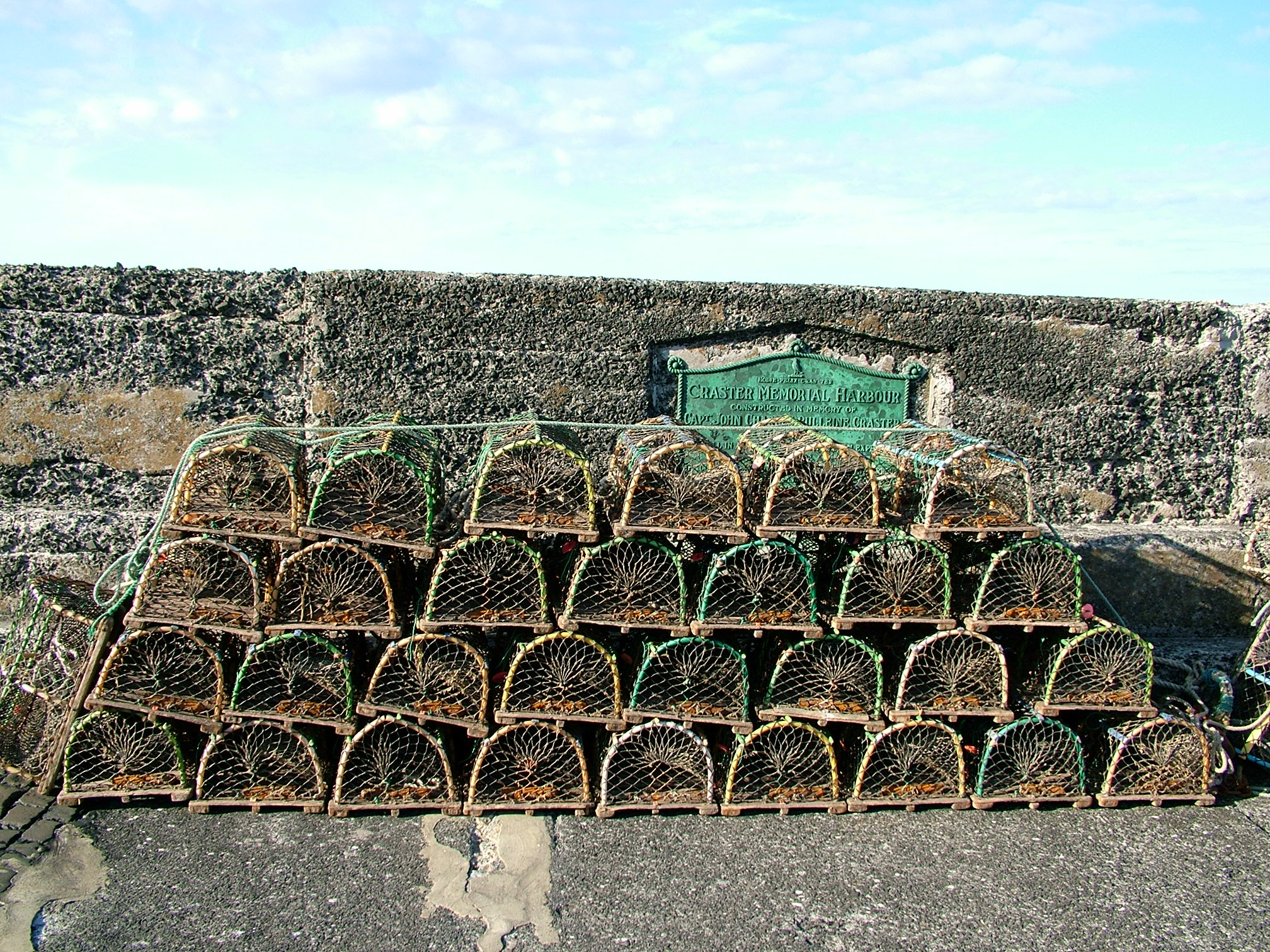
Lobster pots on the harbour wall at Craster, Northumberland

Homarus gammarus is traditionally "highly esteemed" as a foodstuff and was mentioned in "The Crabfish" a seventeenth century English folk song. It may fetch very high prices and may be sold fresh, frozen, canned or powdered. Both the claws and the abdomen of H. gammarus contain "excellent" white meat, and most of the contents of the cephalothorax are edible. The exceptions are the gastric mill and the "sand vein" (gut). The price of H. gammarus is up to three times higher than that of H. americanus, and the European species is considered to be more flavorful.

Lobsters are mostly fished using lobster pots, although lines baited with octopus or cuttlefish sometimes succeed in tempting them out, to allow them to be caught in a net or by hand. In 2008, 4,386 t of H. gammarus were caught across Europe and North Africa, of which 3,462 t (79%) was caught in the British Isles (including the Channel Islands). The minimum landing size for H. gammarus is a carapace length of 87 mm (3.4 in). To protect known breeding females, lobsters caught carrying eggs are to be notched on a uropod, the inner tail flap of female lobsters of reproductive size (usually above the minimum landing size 87mm carapace length). Following this, it is illegal for the female to be kept or sold, and is commonly referred to as a "v-notch". This notch remains for three molts of the lobster exoskeleton, providing harvest protection and continued breeding availability for 3–5 years.

Aquaculture systems for H. gammarus are under development, and production rates are still very low.

== Taxonomic history ==
Homarus gammarus was first given a binomial name by Carl Linnaeus in the tenth edition of his Systema Naturae, published in 1758. That name was Cancer gammarus, since Linnaeus's concept of the genus Cancer at that time included all large crustaceans.

H. gammarus is the type species of the genus Homarus Weber, 1795, as determined by Direction 51 of the International Commission on Zoological Nomenclature. Prior to that direction, confusion arose because the species had been referred to by several different names, including Astacus marinus Fabricius, 1775 and Homarus vulgaris H. Milne-Edwards, 1837, and also because Friedrich Weber's description of the genus had been overlooked until rediscovered by Mary J. Rathbun, rendering any prior assignments of type species (for Homarus H. Milne-Edwards, 1837) invalid for Homarus Weber, 1795.

The type specimen of Homarus gammarus was a lectotype selected by Lipke Holthuis in 1974. It came from 57°53′N 11°32′E, near Marstrand, Sweden (48 kilometres or 30 miles northwest of Gothenburg), but both it and the paralectotypes have since been lost.

The common name for H. gammarus preferred by the Food and Agriculture Organization is "European lobster", but the species is also widely known as the "common lobster".
