= Echinolatus =

Scientific classification
- Kingdom: Animalia
- Phylum: Arthropoda
- Class: Malacostraca
- Order: Decapoda
- Suborder: Pleocyemata
- Infraorder: Brachyura
- Family: Geryonidae
- Genus: Echinolatus; Davie & Crosnier, 2006

Genus of crustaceans

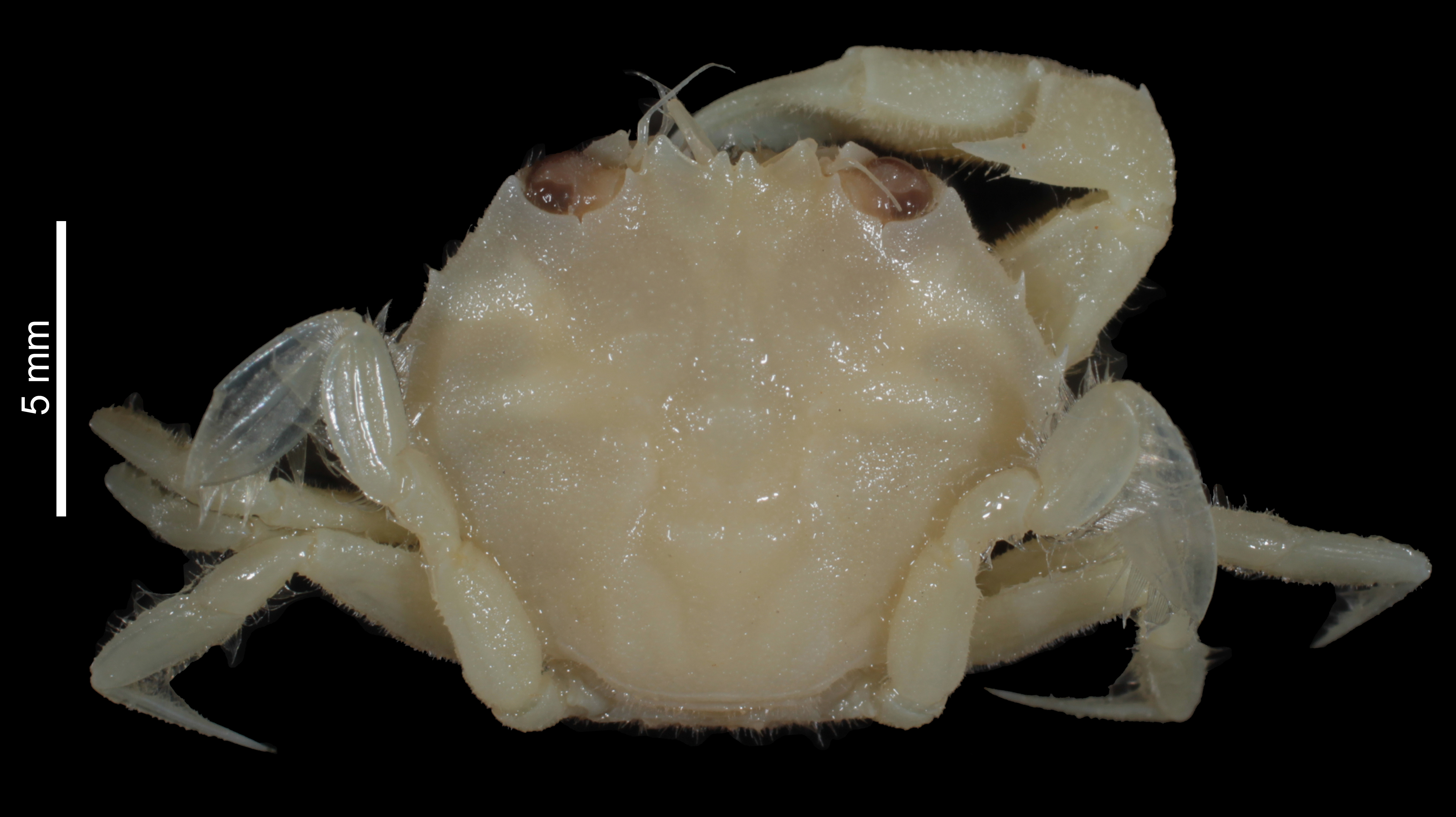
Echinolatus caledonicus

Echinolatus is a genus of crab in the family Geryonidae. The species of this genus are found in Australia and are as follows:

- Echinolatus bullatus (Balss, 1924)
- Echinolatus caledonicus (Moosa, 1996)
- Echinolatus poorei Davie & Crosnier, 2006
- Echinolatus proximus Davie & Crosnier, 2006
