= Gaffkaemia =

Aerococcus viridans var. homari

Scientific classification
- Domain: Bacteria
- Phylum: Bacillota
- Class: Bacilli
- Order: Lactobacillales
- Family: Aerococcaceae
- Genus: Aerococcus
- Species: A. viridans
- Subspecies: A. v. var. homari

Trinomial name
- Aerococcus viridans var. homari (Hitchner & Snieszko, 1947)

Synonyms
- Gaffkya homari Hitchner & Snieszko, 1947; Pediococcus homari (Hitchner & Snieszko, 1947) Deibel & Niven, 1959

Bacterial disease of lobsters

Gaffkaemia (gaffkemia in American English) is a bacterial disease of lobsters, caused by the Gram-positive lactic acid bacterium Aerococcus viridans var. homari.

== Discovery ==
Gaffkaemia was first discovered in 1947 in American lobsters (Homarus americanus) in a holding tank in Maine. It was originally described as "Gaffkya homari" by Hitcher and Snieszko, but the genus name Gaffkya was rejected in 1971, and the gaffkaemia bacterium was recognised as a subspecies or variety of Aerococcus viridans by Kelly and Evans in 1974.

== Effects ==
The effects of gaffkaemia infection include lethargy (typically seen as a drooping tail), anorexia and a pink colour on the ventral side of the abdomen, which gives the disease its alternative common name of red tail disease. When lobsters are moribund, they may lie on their sides, and frequently lose appendages. The effects of gaffkaemia are slowed by low temperatures, such that death can occur within two days of infection at 20 °C (68 °F), but can take over 60 days at 3 °C (37 °F).

As few as five bacteria can lead to clinical disease. When they enter the host, the bacteria colonise the heart and hepatopancreas. They may be engulfed by phagocytosis into the lobster's blood cells, but continue to survive within the blood cells, feeding on the cytoplasm. The lobster's blood cell count drops, and the infection develops into septicaemia. The stores of glycogen in the hepatopancreas become depleted, concentrations of glucose and lactic acid in the blood drop, and concentrations of adenosine triphosphate in muscles also fall. In a severe infection, the ability of the lobster's blood pigment haemocyanin to carry oxygen may be reduced by up to 50%.

== Diagnosis ==
The classical method of diagnosis is to culture aliquots of haemolymph in phenylethyl alcohol broth. Cultures containing A. viridans var. homari change colour from purple to yellow, and form tetrads of cocci. To reduce the four-day waiting time needed for diagnosis, a method using the indirect fluorescent antibody technique (IFAT) was developed, and, more recently, PCR-based methods have been developed.

== Virulence ==
Gaffkaemia is enzootic in North America, and causes little harm to wild populations of H. americanus. In the European or common lobster, Homarus gammarus, however, it is far more destructive. European lobsters held in the same tanks as American lobsters can be killed within days. A number of other crustacean species can be infected with A. v. var. homari, but do not develop severe disease. They include the shrimp Pandalus platyceros, and the crabs Cancer borealis, Cancer irroratus, Metacarcinus magister, Libinia emarginata, Chionoecetes opilio and Chaceon quinquedens. Spiny lobsters appear to be either immune or resistant to gaffkaemia.

== Control ==
The primary method for controlling the incidence of gaffkaemia is improved hygiene. Other measures include limiting damage to the exoskeleton (preventing the bacterium's entry), reducing the water temperature, and reducing the stocking density. Antibiotics may be effective against the bacterium, but only tetracycline is currently approved by the U.S. Food and Drug Administration for use in American lobsters.
