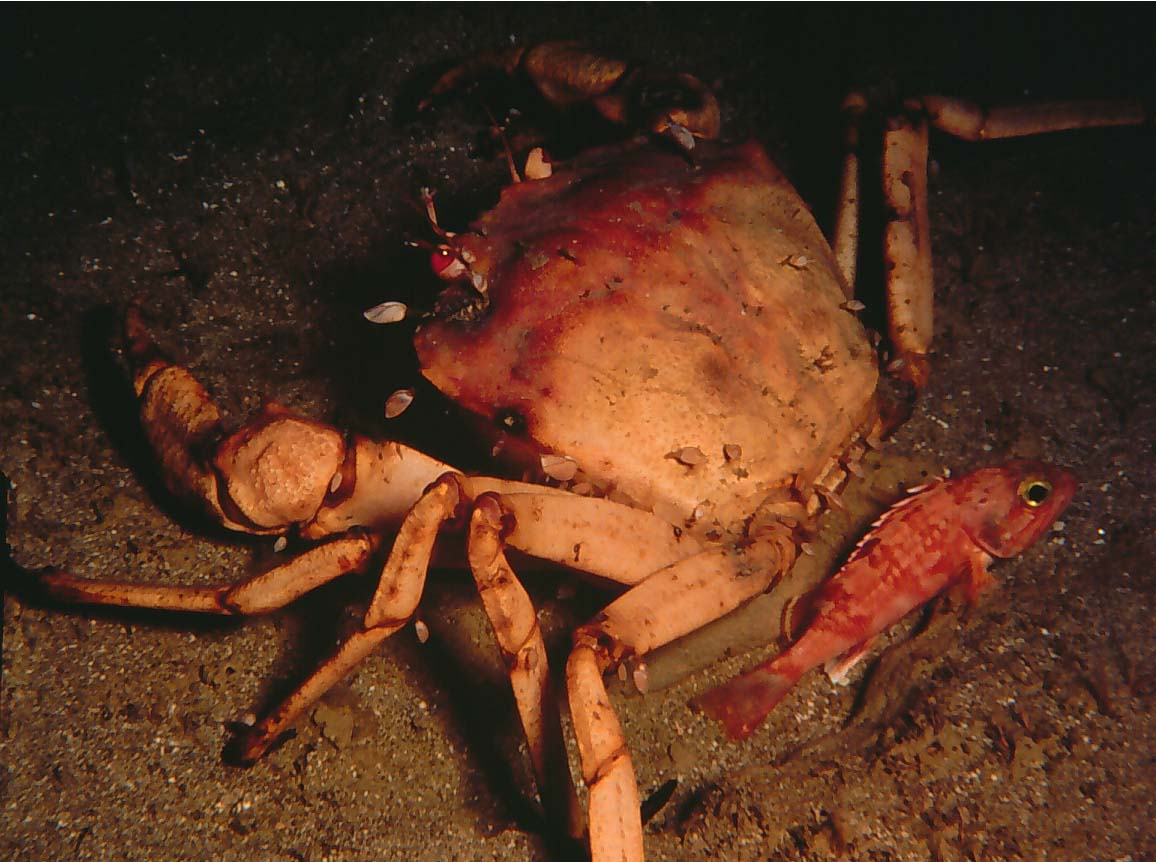
- Chaceon fenneri and a blackbelly rosefish

Scientific classification
- Domain: Eukaryota
- Kingdom: Animalia
- Phylum: Arthropoda
- Class: Malacostraca
- Order: Decapoda
- Suborder: Pleocyemata
- Infraorder: Brachyura
- Family: Geryonidae
- Genus: Chaceon
- Species: C. fenneri

Binomial name
- Chaceon fenneri (Manning & Holthuis, 1984)

Synonyms
- Geryon fenneri

= Chaceon fenneri =

Species of crab

Chaceon fenneri, commonly known as the golden crab or golden deepsea crab, is one of several species of crab harvested for food by humans. It was formerly called Geryon fenneri. Like the blue crab, its common name comes from the color of its shell; it is usually cream to tan in color. Both parts of the binomen Chaceon fenneri commemorate Fenner A. Chace Jr. It is found on the ocean floor at depths of 200 to 1,500 m (660–4,920 ft) in the tropical west Atlantic, ranging from the Gulf of Mexico to Brazil. It cannot swim. The carapace of this large crab measures up to 20 cm (7.9 in), making the entire animal similar in size to a dinner plate. Its diet includes benthic (bottom-dwelling) organisms like mollusks and worms.
