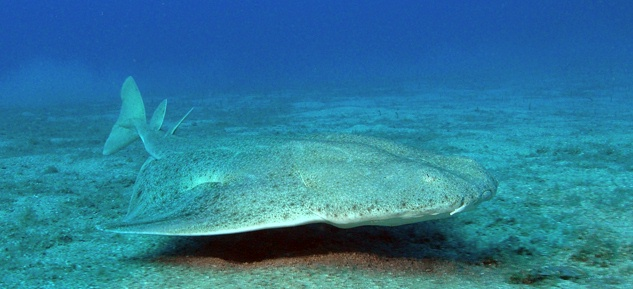
- Angelshark (S. squatina) off Tenerife, Canary Islands.
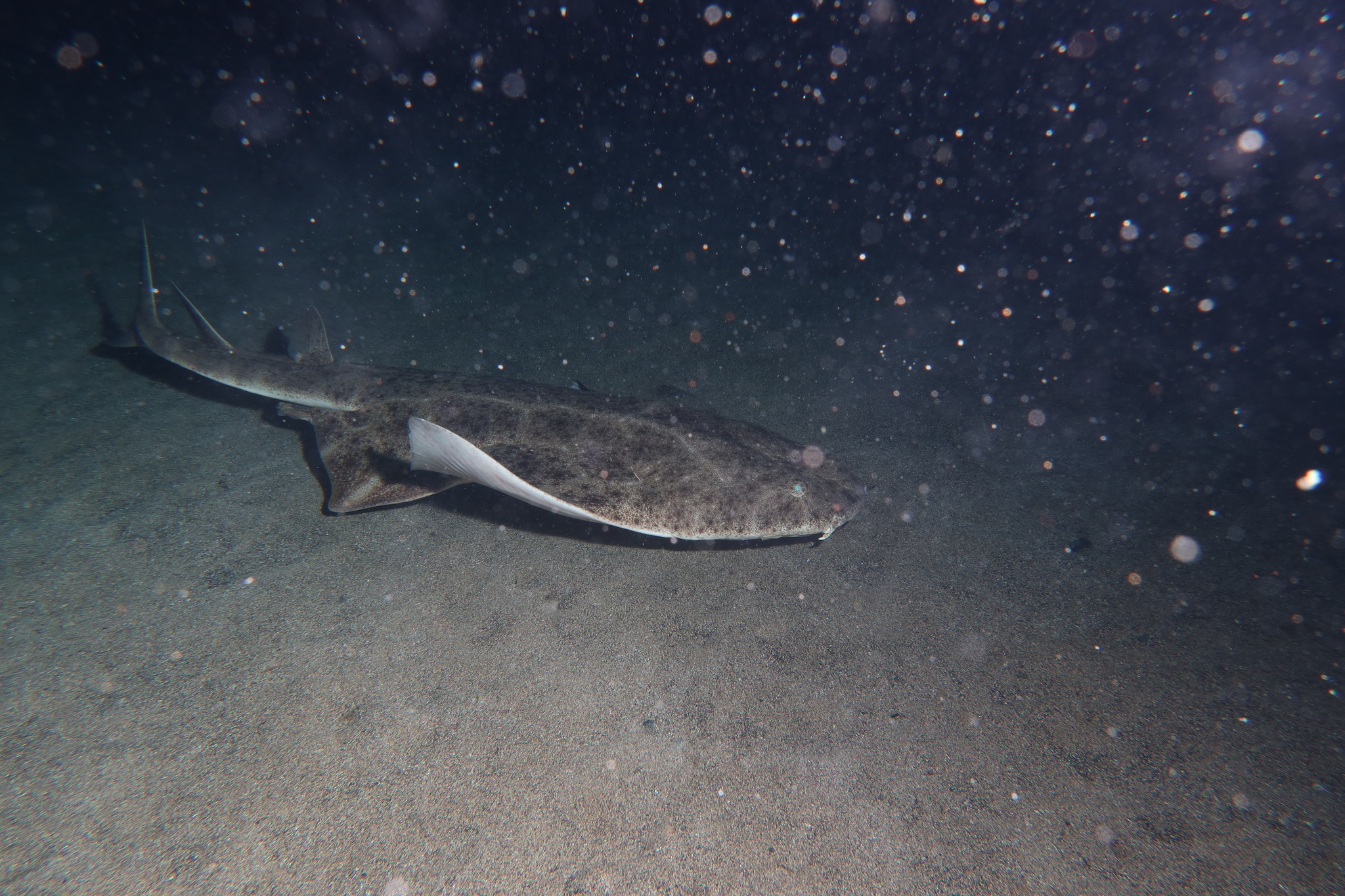
- Squatina squatina

Conservation status
- Critically Endangered (IUCN 3.1)

Scientific classification
- Kingdom: Animalia
- Phylum: Chordata
- Class: Chondrichthyes
- Subclass: Elasmobranchii
- Division: Selachii
- Order: Squatiniformes
- Family: Squatinidae
- Genus: Squatina
- Species: S. squatina

Binomial name
- Squatina squatina (Linnaeus, 1758)
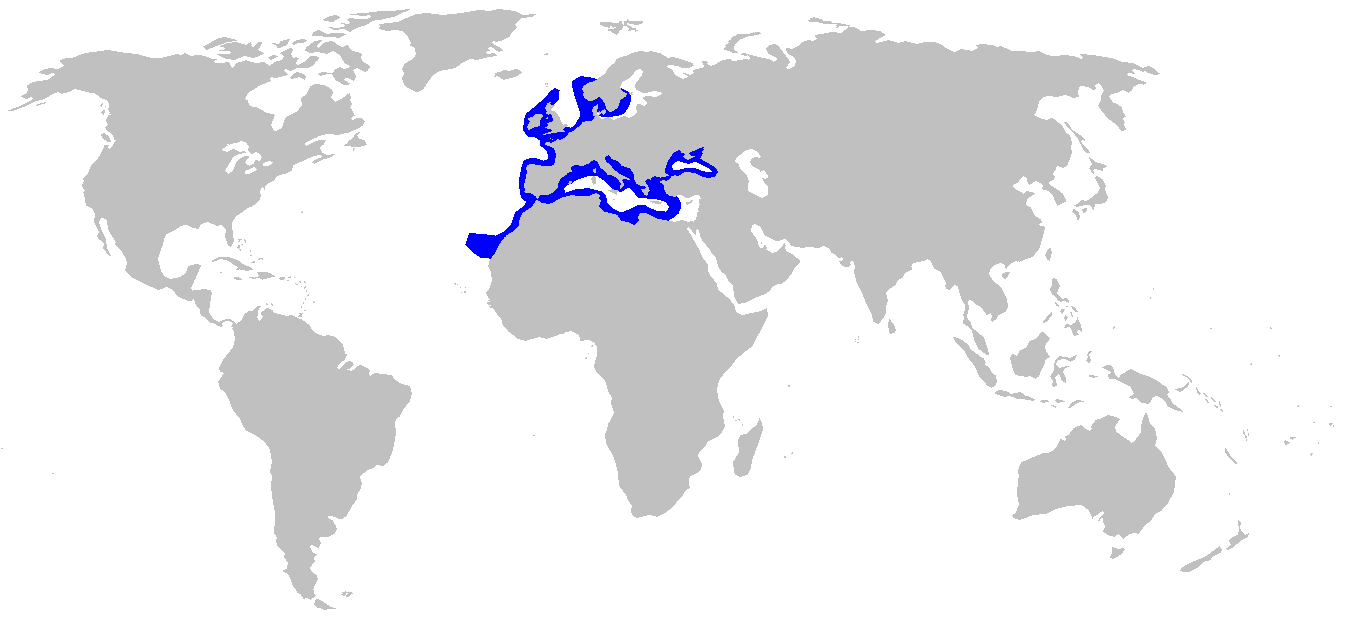
- Former range of the angelshark

Synonyms
- Squalraia acephala* de la Pylaie, 1835; Squalraia cervicata* de la Pylaie, 1835; Squalus squatina Linnaeus, 1758; Squatina angelus Blainville, 1825; Squatina angelus Gronow, 1854; Squatina europaea Swainson, 1839; Squatina laevis Cuvier, 1816; Squatina lewis Couch, 1825; Squatina vulgaris Risso, 1810 * ambiguous synonym

= Squatina squatina =

Angelshark

Species of shark

Squatina squatina, known as the common angelshark, is a species of shark in the family Squatinidae (known generally also as angel sharks), that were once widespread in the coastal waters of the northeastern Atlantic Ocean. Well-adapted for camouflaging itself on the sea floor, the angelshark has a flattened form with enlarged pectoral and pelvic fins, giving it a superficial resemblance to a ray. This species can be identified by its broad and stout body, conical barbels, thornless back (in larger individuals), and grayish or brownish dorsal coloration with a pattern of numerous small light and dark markings (that is more vivid in juveniles). It measures up to 2.4 m (7.9 ft) long.

Like other members of its family, the angelshark is a nocturnal ambush predator that buries itself in sediment and waits for passing prey, mostly benthic bony fishes, but also skates and invertebrates. An aplacental viviparous species, females bear litters of seven to 25 pups every other year. The angelshark normally poses little danger to humans, though if provoked, it is quick to bite. Since the mid-20th century, intense commercial fishing across the angelshark's range has decimated its population via bycatch – it is now locally extinct or nearly so across most of its northern range, and the prospects of the remaining fragmented subpopulations are made more precarious by its slow rate of reproduction. As a result, the International Union for Conservation of Nature has assessed this species as critically endangered.

== Taxonomy and phylogeny ==
The angelshark was originally described by the Swedish natural historian Carl Linnaeus, known as the "father of taxonomy", in the 1758 tenth edition of Systema Naturae as Squalus squatina. He did not designate a type specimen. The word squatina is the name for skate in Latin; it was made the genus name for all angel sharks by the French zoologist André Duméril in 1806. Other common names used for this species include angel, angel fiddle fish, angel puffy fish, angel ray, angelfish, escat jueu, fiddle fish, monk, and monkfish. Stelbrink and colleagues (2010) conducted a phylogenetic study based on mitochondrial DNA, and found that the sister species of the angelshark is the sawback angelshark (S. aculeata). The two species formed a clade with a number of Asian angelshark species.

== Description ==
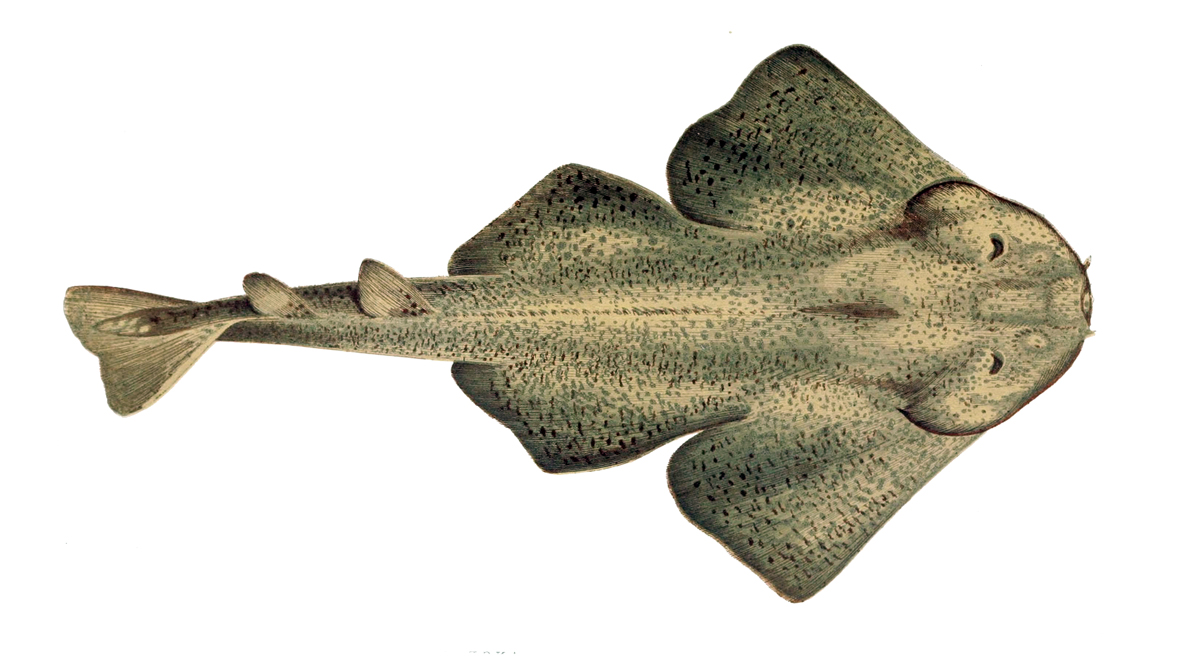
Early illustration of an angelshark from Les poissons (1877)

One of the largest members of its family, female angelsharks can attain a length of 2.4 m (7.9 ft) and males 1.8 m (5.9 ft); the maximum reported weight is 80 kg (180 lb). This species shares in common with other angelsharks a flattened body and large, wing-like pectoral fins whose anterior lobes are not fused to the head. The head and body are very broad and stocky, with small eyes positioned dorsally and followed by a pair of larger spiracles. A pair of unadorned barbels occurs in front of the nares, as well as a smooth or weakly fringed flap. Folds of skin with a single triangular lobe are present on the sides of the head. The teeth are small, sharp, and of similar shape in both jaws.

The pectoral and pelvic fins are wide with rounded tips; the two dorsal fins are positioned on the muscular tail behind the pelvic fins. The anal fin is absent, and the caudal fin has a larger lower lobe than upper. The dermal denticles are small, narrow, and pointed, and cover the entire upper and most of the lower body surface. There are patches of small spines on the snout and over the eyes. Small individuals have a row of thorns down the middle of the back. The coloration is gray to reddish or greenish brown above, with many small black and white spots, and white below. Juveniles are more ornately patterned than adults, with pale lines and darker blotches. The dorsal fins have a darker leading margin and lighter trailing margin. Some individuals have a white spot on the back of the "neck".

== Distribution and habitat ==
The angelshark occurs in the temperate waters of the northeastern Atlantic, from southern Norway and Sweden to the Western Sahara and the Canary Islands, including around Ireland and Britain and in the Mediterranean. According to the IUCN, it is possible that it has been extirpated from the North Sea. It remains extant around the Canary Islands, Algeria, Tunisia, Libya, Palestine, Turkey, northern Cyprus, eastern Greece (the Aegean Sea), the Adriatic Sea of eastern Italy, Sicily, Malta, Corsica, Ireland and western Britain/Wales . Its modern presence in parts of the Mediterranean is unknown, such as around Madeira, the Azores, Morocco, Egypt, continental Spain and France, Crete, Syria, Sardinia, western Greece and western Italy. This benthic shark inhabits the continental shelf, preferring soft substrates such as mud or sand, and can be found from near the coast to a depth of 150 m (490 ft). It sometimes enters brackish environments. Northern angelshark subpopulations migrate northward in summer and southward in winter.

== Biology and ecology ==
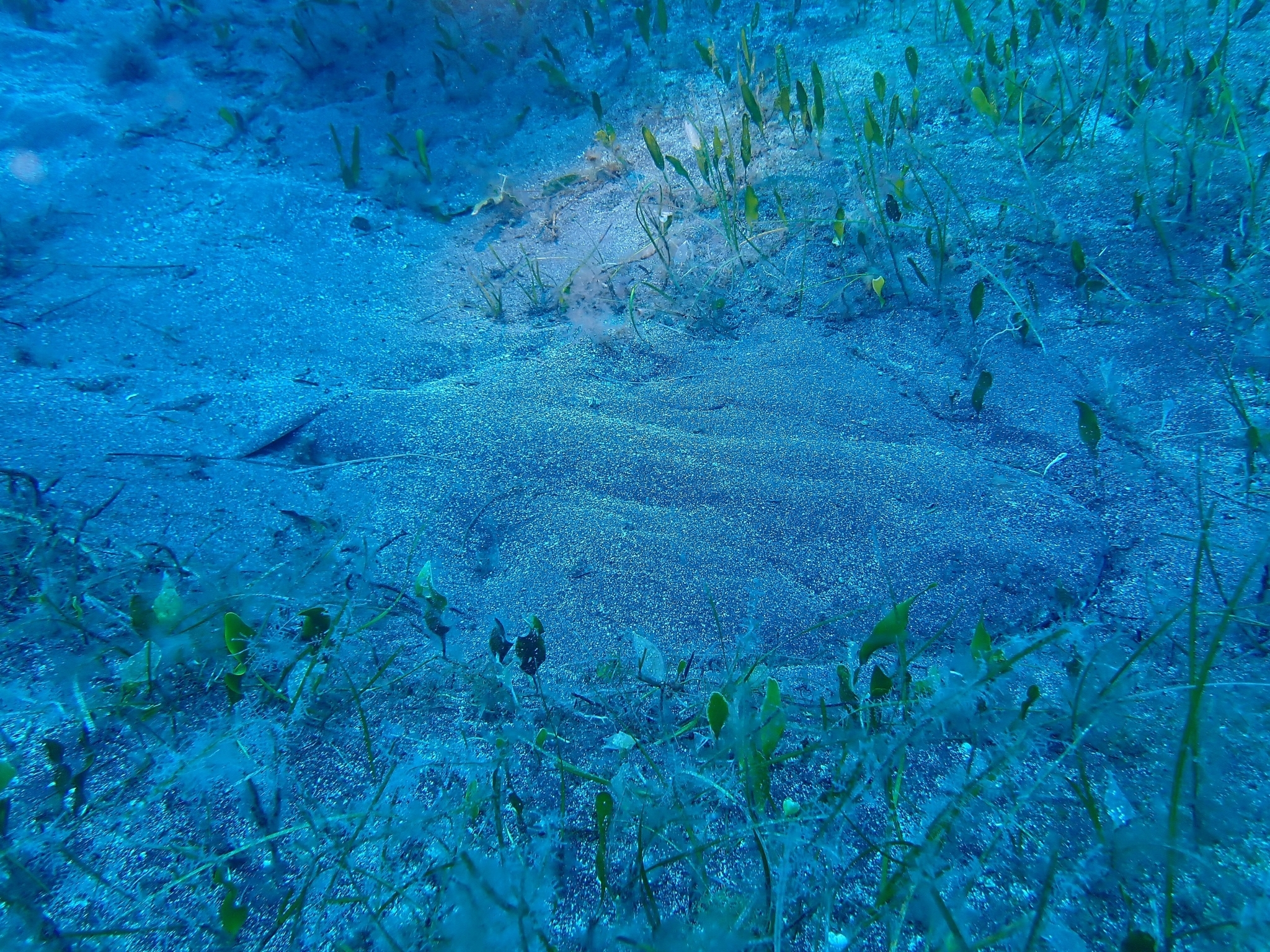
The angelshark is well-camouflaged against soft-bottomed seafloors.

During daytime, the angelshark usually lies motionless on the sea floor, buried under a layer of sediment with only its eyes showing. At night, it becomes more active, and may sometimes be seen swimming above the bottom. Aggregations numbering up to a hundred have been observed off Gran Canaria in the summer.

The angelshark is an ambush predator that feeds mainly on bottom-dwelling bony fishes, especially flatfishes, though it also preys on skates and invertebrates. Prey reported taken include the hake Merluccius merluccius, the bream Pagellus erythrinus, grunts in the genus Pomadasys, the flatfishes Bothus spp., Citharus linguatula, and Solea solea, the squid Loligo vulgaris, the cuttlefishes Sepia officinalis and Sepiola spp., and the crabs Medorippe lanata, Geryon trispinosus, Dromia personata, Goneplax rhomboides, Liocarcinus corrugatus, and Atelecyclus rotundatus. The stomachs of some examined specimens have also contained seagrass or birds (in one case an entire cormorant). Individual sharks select sites that offer the best ambush opportunities, and if successful, may remain there for several days.

Angelsharks are aplacental viviparous, meaning the young hatch inside the mother's uterus and are nourished by a yolk sac until birth. Females have two functional ovaries, with the right ovary containing more oocytes and the right uterus correspondingly containing more embryos; this functional asymmetry is not present in other angel shark species. Unlike most sharks, in which vitellogenesis (yolk formation) occurs concurrently with pregnancy, in the angelshark, the onset of vitellogenesis is delayed until halfway through the gestation period. The mature ova measure 8 cm (3.1 in) across and are not enclosed in a capsule. The reproductive cycle has been estimated at 2 years with ovulation taking place in spring, though this periodicity is ill-defined. The litter size ranges from seven to 25 and is correlated with the size of the mother; the young are gestated for 8–10 months. Parturition occurs from December to February in the Mediterranean and in July off England, with the newborns measuring 24–30 cm (9.4–11.8 in) long. Males and females mature at lengths of 0.8–1.3 m (2.6–4.3 ft) and 1.3–1.7 m (4.3–5.6 ft), respectively.

Squatina squatina is preyed upon species such as Bathytoshia centroura (roughtail stingray) and possibly Seriola dumerili, but for S. dumerili it may only be juveniles. The first reported incident of S. dumerili was in 2024 off the coast of Los Terresitas Beach, Tenerife, Canary islands. It saw a Roughtail stingray attempt to predate on a juvenile S. squatina but failing to do so only for the S. squatina individual to be captured by the Greater amberjack.

Known parasites of this species include the tapeworms Grillotia smaris-gora, G. angeli, and Christianella minuta, the fluke Pseudocotyle squatinae, the monogenean Leptocotyle minor, and the isopod Aega rosacea.

== Human interactions ==
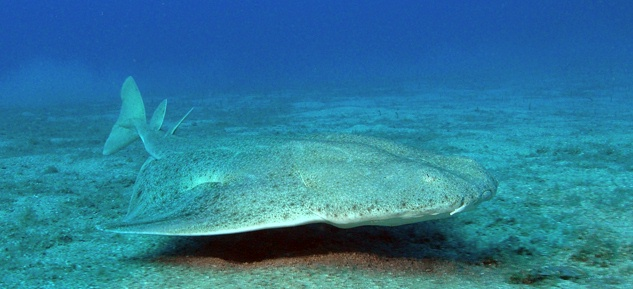
An angelshark off Tenerife in the Canary Islands, one of the few remaining locations with a substantial population

The angelshark is generally not aggressive towards humans, though it can deliver a severe bite if disturbed. When approached underwater, the angelshark usually remains still or swims away, though one circling a diver with its mouth open is recorded. Fishery workers, in particular, should treat it with caution; in the 1776 edition of British Zoology, Thomas Pennant wrote that it is "extremely fierce and dangerous to be approached. We know of an instance of a fisherman, whose leg was terribly torn by a large one of this species, which lay within his nets in shallow water, and which he went to lay hold of incautiously."

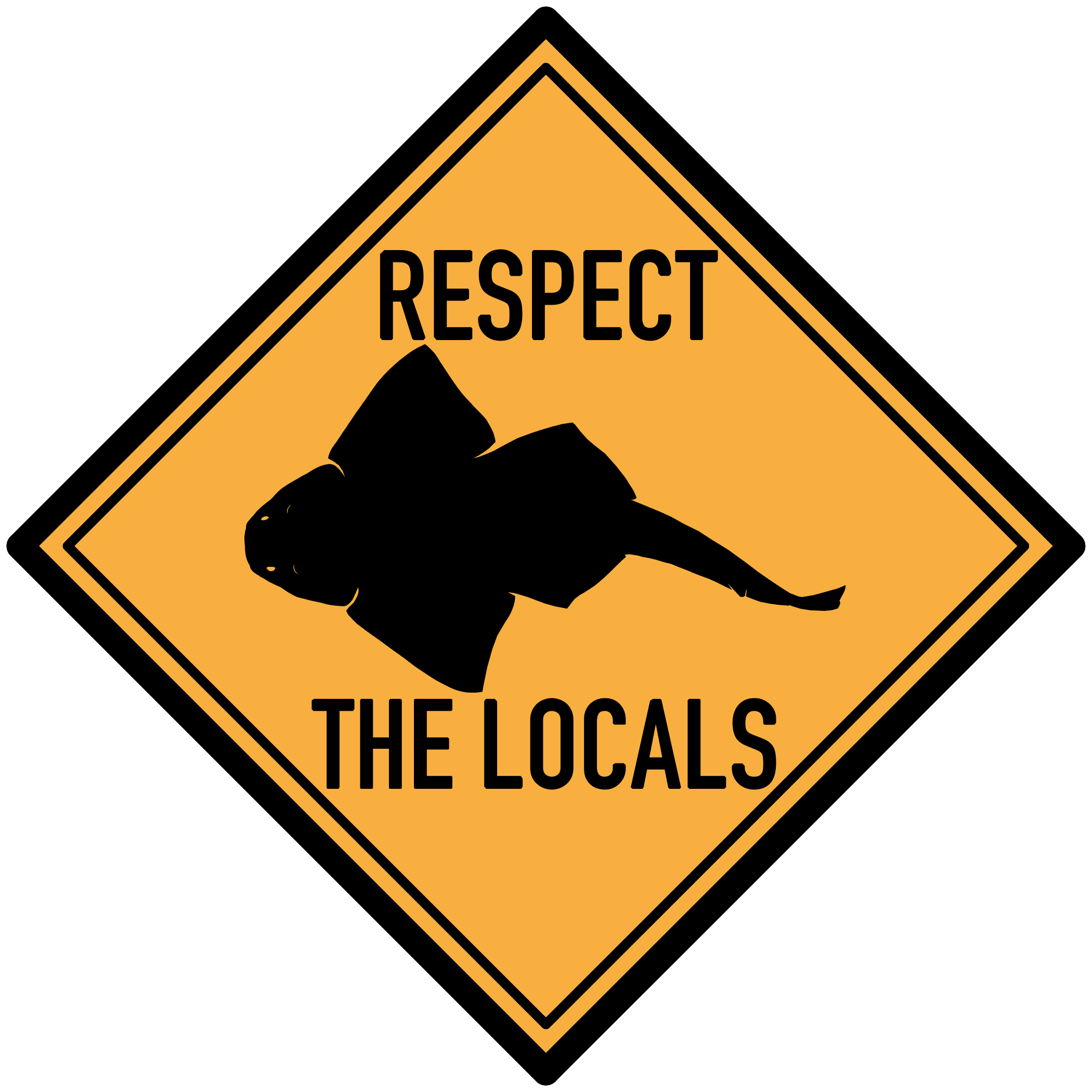
The angel shark (Squatina squatina) is in critical danger of extinction.

Humans have used the angelshark for thousands of years. Ancient Greek authors, such as Diphilus and Mnesitheus, described its meat as "light" and "easily digestible", and Pliny the Elder noted in his Naturalis Historia (77–79 AD) that its rough skin was valued by craftsmen for polishing wood and ivory. Aristotle recorded elements of its natural history, including that it bore live young, and correctly recognized that it was a shark despite its resemblance to rays and skates. The use of this species for food has continued into modern times; it is sold fresh or dried and salted, often under the name "monkfish" (which also refers to the goosefishes of the genus Lophius). The angelshark may also be a source for shark liver oil and fishmeal.

=== Conservation status ===
Sources from the 19th and early 20th centuries indicate that the angelshark was once abundant all around the coasts of Western Europe. Yarrell (1836), Day (1880–04), and Garstang (1903) all noted that the angelshark was common around the Britain and Ireland, and Rey (1928) recorded that this species was common around the Iberian Peninsula and in the Mediterranean. However, from the latter half of the 20th century onwards, the angelshark has come under intense pressure from commercial fisheries operating across much of its range. Due to its benthic, near-shore habits, individuals of all ages are susceptible to incidental capture by bottom trawls, trammel nets, and bottom longlines; the low reproductive rate of this shark limits its capacity to withstand population depletion. This has also led to habitat loss caused by the development of coastal areas for commercialism and tourism.

Angelshark numbers have declined precipitously across most of its range; it is now believed to be extinct in the North Sea and most of the northern Mediterranean, and has become extremely rare elsewhere. During the comprehensive Mediterranean International Trawl Survey program from 1995 to 1999, only two angelsharks were captured from 9,905 trawls. Similarly, another survey by the Italian National Project (National Group for Demersal Resource Evaluation) around the same period caught angelsharks in only 38 of 9,281 trawls. Fishery data compiled by the Working Group for Elasmobranch Fishes (WGEF) show that no angelsharks have been landed in the Northeast Atlantic since 1998. Fewer than a dozen angelsharks are thought to remain in Irish waters. Healthy subpopulations of angelsharks are thought to still persist in areas off North Africa and around the Canary Islands, though a more thorough assessment is urgently needed.

As a result of these steep population declines and the ongoing threat from demersal fisheries, the IUCN has assessed the angelshark as critically endangered. An assessment of the angelshark population by the IUCN showed a decrease in population of over 90%. The assessment also showed that there was no signs of recovery of the population. It was listed on Annex III of the 1976 Barcelona Convention, which aims to limit pollution in the Mediterranean Sea. In 2012 it was moved to Annex II, making it illegal to catch and keep in countries bordering the Mediterranean Sea (if caught, it must be released). This species is protected within three marine reserves in the Balearic Islands, although it has not been reported from this area since the mid-1990s. In 2008, the angelshark also received full legal protection from human activities in the waters off England and Wales from the coast to a distance of 11 km (6.8 mi), under the UK Wildlife and Countryside Act. Since 2010, it has been illegal to keep angelsharks caught in waters of the European Union (if caught, it must be released). The United Kingdom and Belgium have pushed, unsuccessfully, for this species to be listed on the Convention for the Protection of the Marine Environment of the North-East Atlantic Priority List of Threatened and Endangered Species. A captive breeding program has been initiated at Deep Sea World, North Queensferry, with the first live pups born in 2011.

In 2019, a population of angelsharks was discovered off the coast of Wales, indicating that the species had begun a potential return to the region.
