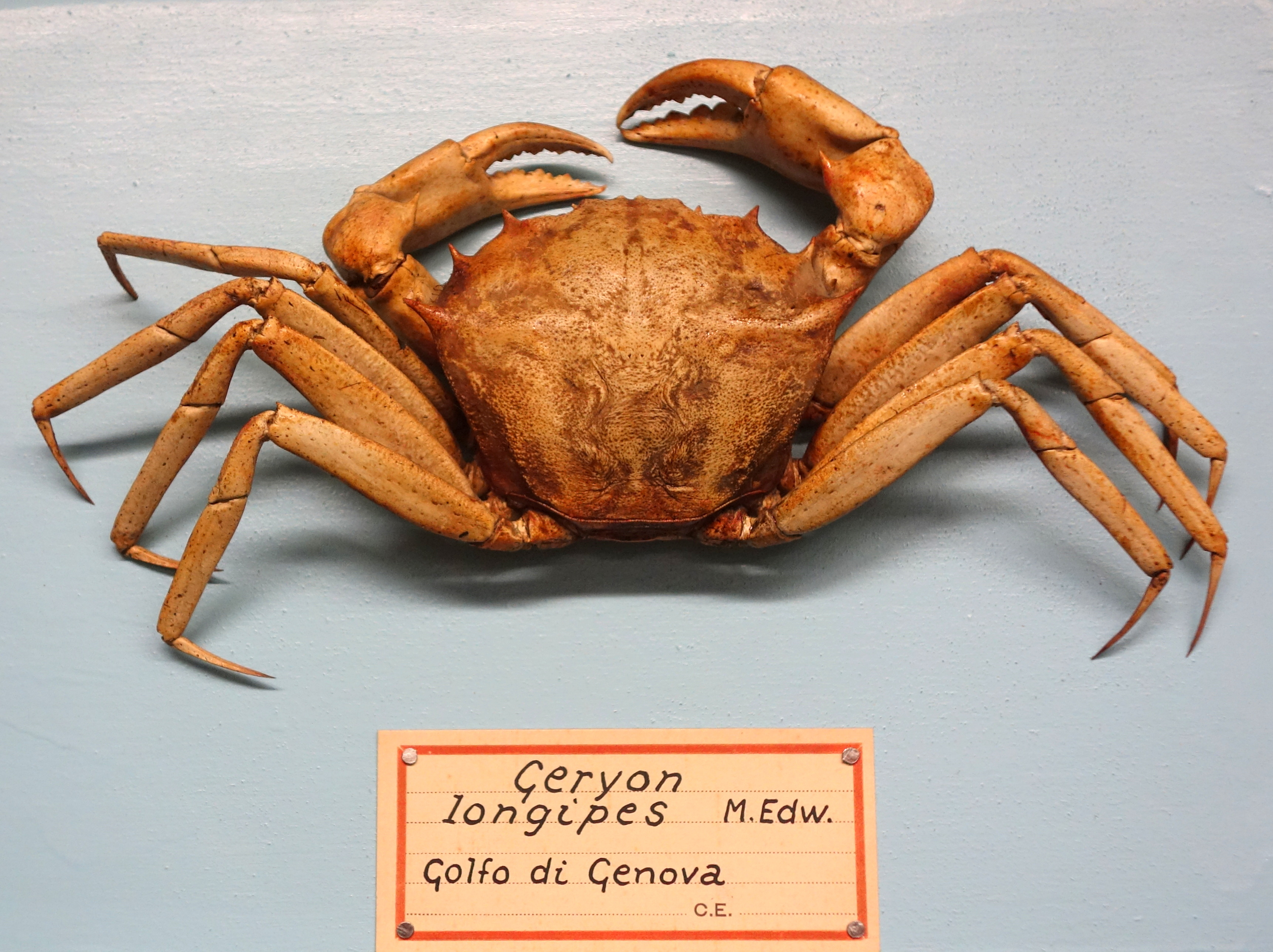

Scientific classification
- Kingdom: Animalia
- Phylum: Arthropoda
- Class: Malacostraca
- Order: Decapoda
- Suborder: Pleocyemata
- Infraorder: Brachyura
- Family: Geryonidae
- Genus: Geryon
- Species: G. longipes

Binomial name
- Geryon longipes Milne-Edwards, 1882

= Geryon longipes =

Species of crab

Geryon longipes (colloquially Mediterranean geryon) is a species of crabs belonging to the family Geryonidae.

It is native to Southern Europe.
