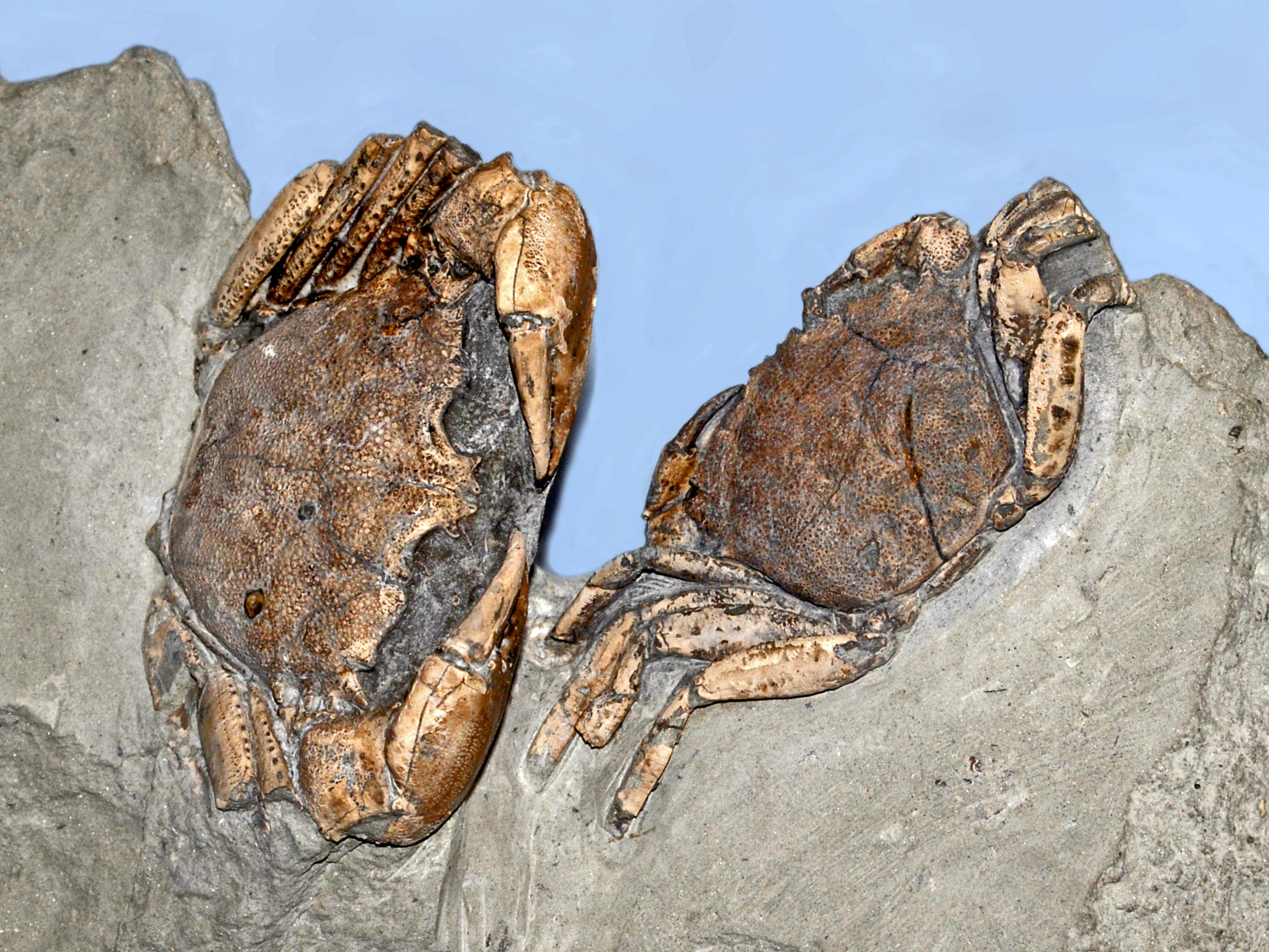
- Fossils of Coeloma vigil

Scientific classification
- Kingdom: Animalia
- Phylum: Arthropoda
- Class: Malacostraca
- Order: Decapoda
- Suborder: Pleocyemata
- Infraorder: Brachyura
- Family: Geryonidae
- Genus: †Coeloma; A. Milne-Edwards, 1865

Type species
- Coeloma vigil A. Milne-Edwards, 1865

= Coeloma =

Coeloma Temporal range: Thanetian–Pliocene

Extinct genus of crabs

Coeloma is an extinct genus of crabs belonging to the family Geryonidae or Mathildellidae. The genus includes 17 species, formerly distributed among several subgenera. The fossil record of the genus extends from the Thanetian to the Pliocene.

== Species ==
There are 17 species:

- †Coeloma balticum Schlüter, 1879
- †Coeloma bicarinatum Ravn, 1904
- †Coeloma birsteini Ilyin, 2005
- †Coeloma credneri Noetling, 1881
- †Coeloma egerense Lőrenthey in Lőrenthey & Beurlen, 1929
- †Coeloma granulosum A. Milne-Edwards, 1881
- †Coeloma holsaticum Stolley, 1890
- †Coeloma incarinatum Sorgenfrei, 1940
- †Coeloma isseli Ristori, 1886
- †Coeloma latifrons Förster & Mundlos, 1982
- †Coeloma macoveii Lǎzǎrescu, 1959
- †Coeloma mallissensis Thiede & Moths, 2016
- †Coeloma rupeliense Stainier, 1887
- †Coeloma sabatium Ristori, 1886
- †Coeloma taunicum (von Meyer, 1862)
- †Coeloma vareolata Lőrenthey, 1898
- †Coeloma vigil A. Milne-Edwards, 1865
