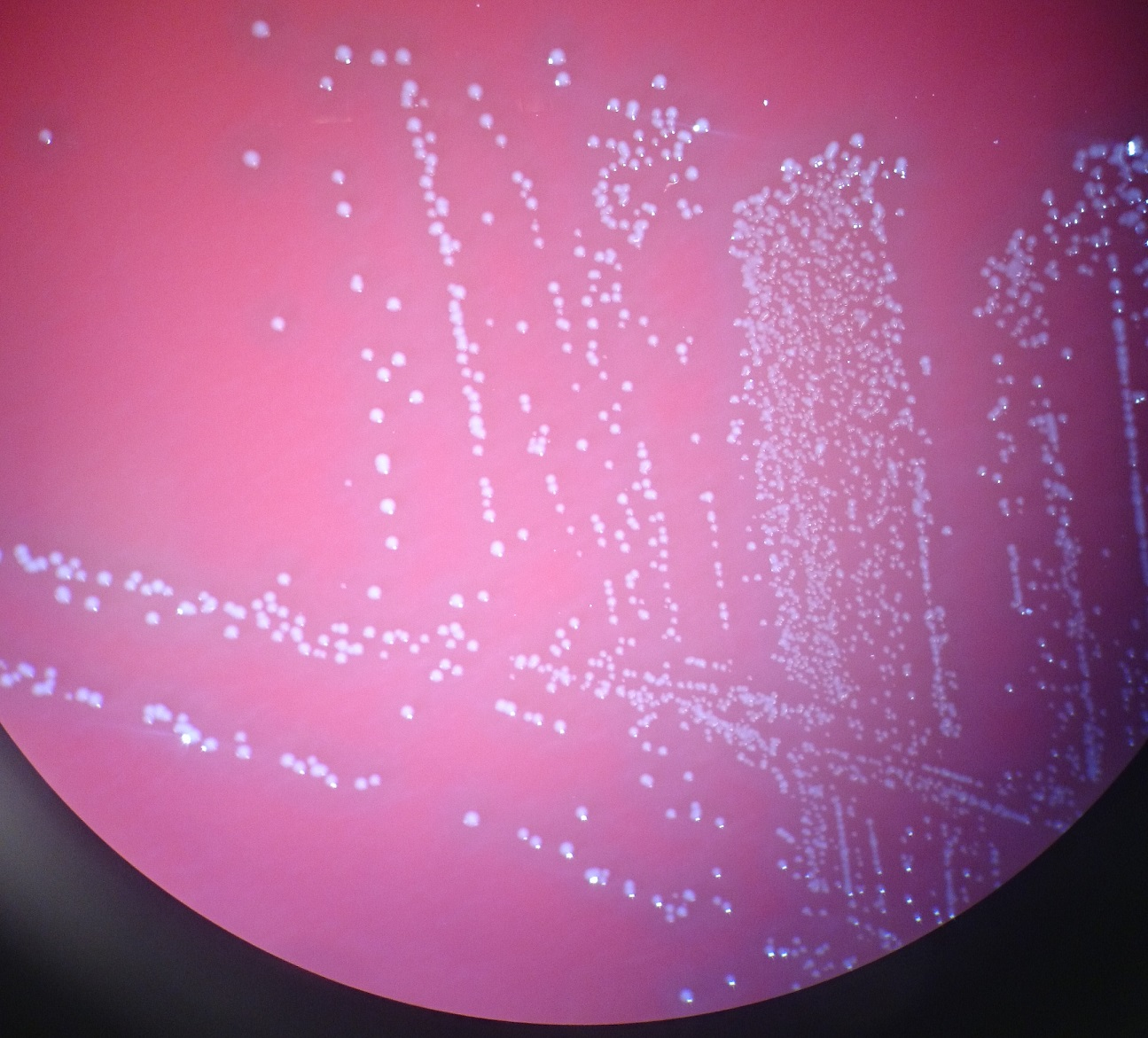
- Aerococcus urinae on blood agar
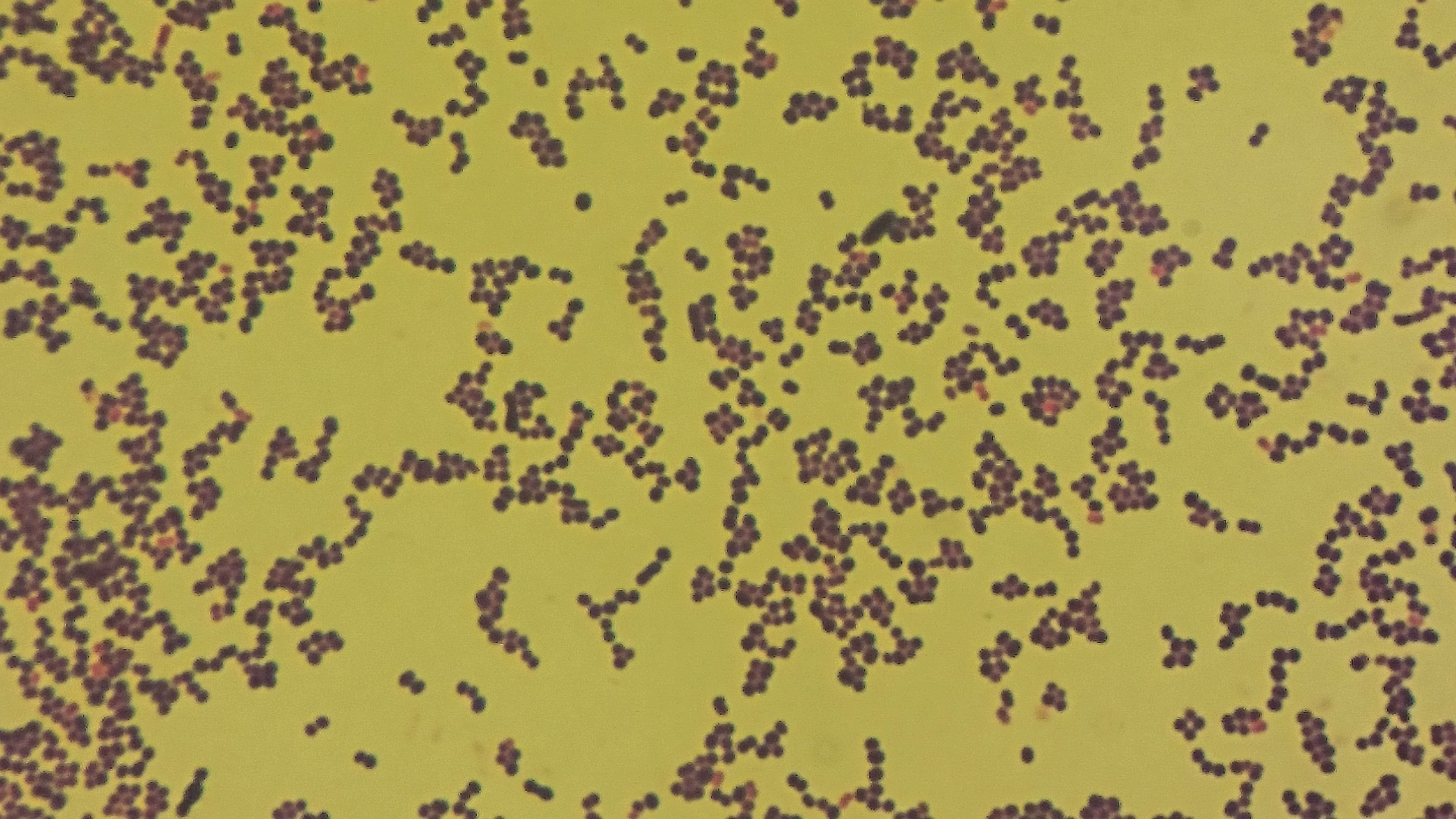
- Microscopy of Aerococcus urinae with gram stain, showing gram positive cocci.

Scientific classification
- Domain: Bacteria
- Kingdom: Bacillati
- Phylum: Bacillota
- Class: Bacilli
- Order: Lactobacillales
- Family: Aerococcaceae
- Genus: Aerococcus
- Species: A. urinae

Binomial name
- Aerococcus urinae Aguirre & Collins, 1992

= Aerococcus urinae =

Species of bacterium

Aerococcus urinae is a gram-positive bacterium associated with urinary tract infections.

== Classification ==
Aerococcus urinae is a member of the bacterial genus Aerococcus. The bacterium is a Gram-positive, catalase-negative coccus growing in clusters. Isolates of this genus were originally isolated in 1953 from samples collected in the air and dust of occupied rooms and were distinguished by their tetrad cellular arrangements. Later, it was found in the urine of patients with urinary tract infections and in 1992, A. urinae was assigned as distinct species. Due to difficulties in the biochemical identification of A. urinae in clinical microbiological laboratories, the incidence of infections with this bacterium has likely been underestimated and secure identification relies on genetic techniques like 16S ribosomal subunit sequencing or mass spectroscopic methods such as MALDI-TOF.

== Clinical relevance ==
Aerococcus urinae may also cause invasive infections including sepsis originating from the urinary tract and infective endocarditis, especially in elderly men with underlying urinary tract diseases.

Aerococcus urinae is sensitive to many commonly used antibiotics such as penicillins, cephalosporins, and vancomycin. Nitrofurantoin has been reported to be effective in one series of 42 clinical isolates. The bacterium can form biofilms on foreign materials and can aggregate human platelets, two features of potential importance for the disease causing capacity of this organism.

Aerococcus urinae is the most common aerococcus isolated from invasive human infections whereas Aerococcus sanguinicola is isolated from human urine as often as A. urinae.
