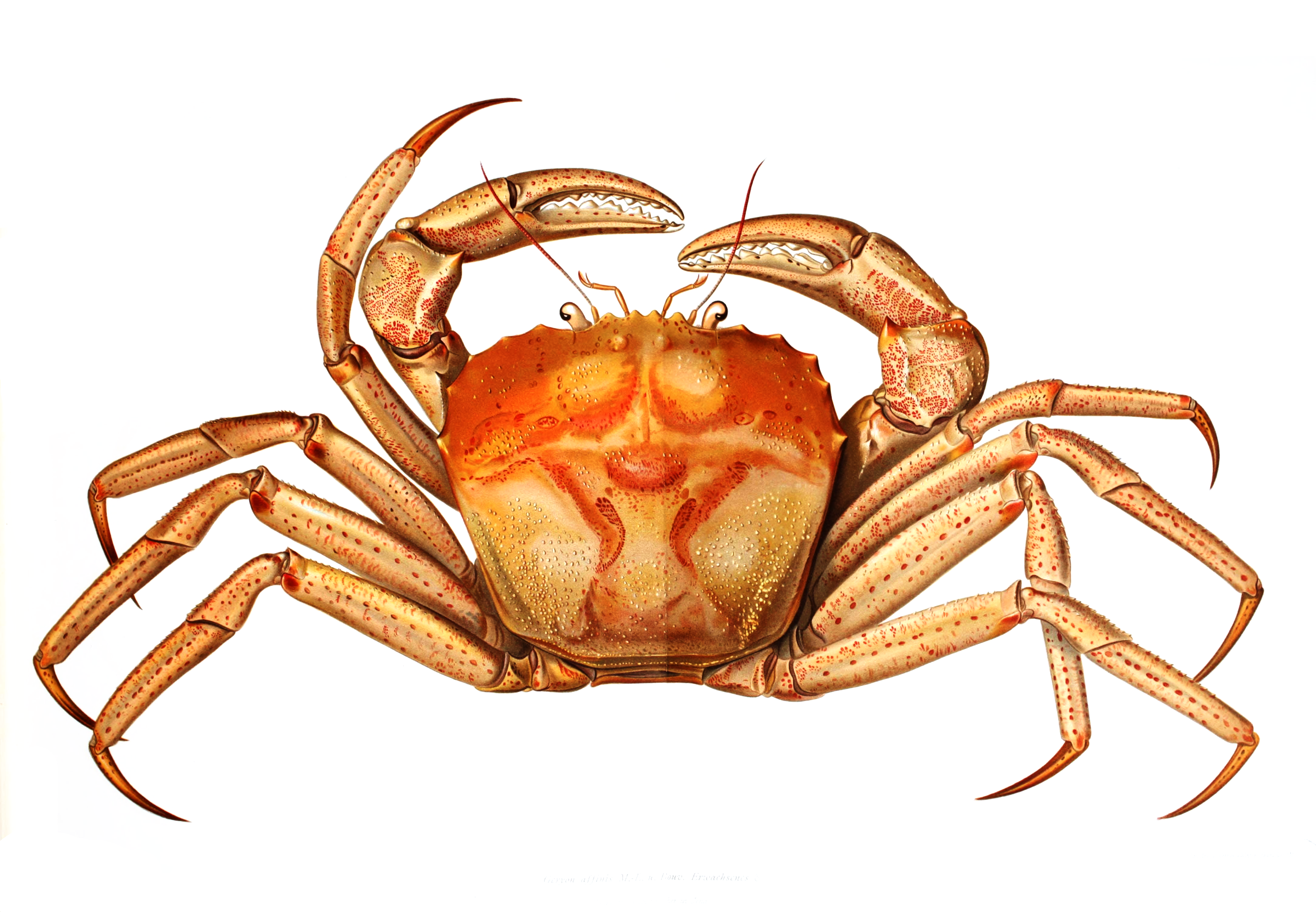

Scientific classification
- Kingdom: Animalia
- Phylum: Arthropoda
- Class: Malacostraca
- Order: Decapoda
- Suborder: Pleocyemata
- Infraorder: Brachyura
- Family: Geryonidae
- Genus: Chaceon
- Species: C. affinis

Binomial name
- Chaceon affinis (A. Milne-Edwards & Bouvier, 1894)

Synonyms
- Geryon affinis

= Chaceon affinis =

Species of deep-sea crab

Chaceon affinis is a deep-sea crab in the family Geryonidae. It was first described in 1894 based on specimens caught off the Azores by the yacht L'Hirondelle. The species is found in the Atlantic from 140 to 2,000 m (460 to 6,560 ft) metres deep. They have a carapace length of 8 to 12 cm (3.1 to 4.7 in).

They are rarely caught by traditional fishers, and most have been obtained using baited traps. Direct observations using unmanned submersibles have shown large numbers of them around hydrothermal vents.
