= Aerococcus sanguinicola =

Scientific classification
- Domain: Bacteria
- Kingdom: Bacillati
- Phylum: Bacillota
- Class: Bacilli
- Order: Lactobacillales
- Family: Aerococcaceae
- Genus: Aerococcus
- Species: A. sanguinicola

Binomial name
- Aerococcus sanguinicola Lawson et al. 2001

Species of bacterium

Aerococcus sanguinicola is a member of the bacterial genus Aerococcus and is a Gram-positive, catalase-negative coccus growing in clusters. This species was formally described in 2001 and has since then been increasingly recognized as a pathogen causing urinary tract infections and also invasive infections including infective endocarditis. Commercially available biochemical tests fail to properly identify A. sanguinicola and correct identification can be achieved through genetic or mass spectroscopic methods, such as matrix-assisted laser desorption/ionization time of flight (MALDI-TOF). A. sanguinicola is, with A. urinae, the most common aerococcus isolated from urine, but from blood, A. urinae is much more commonly encountered.
