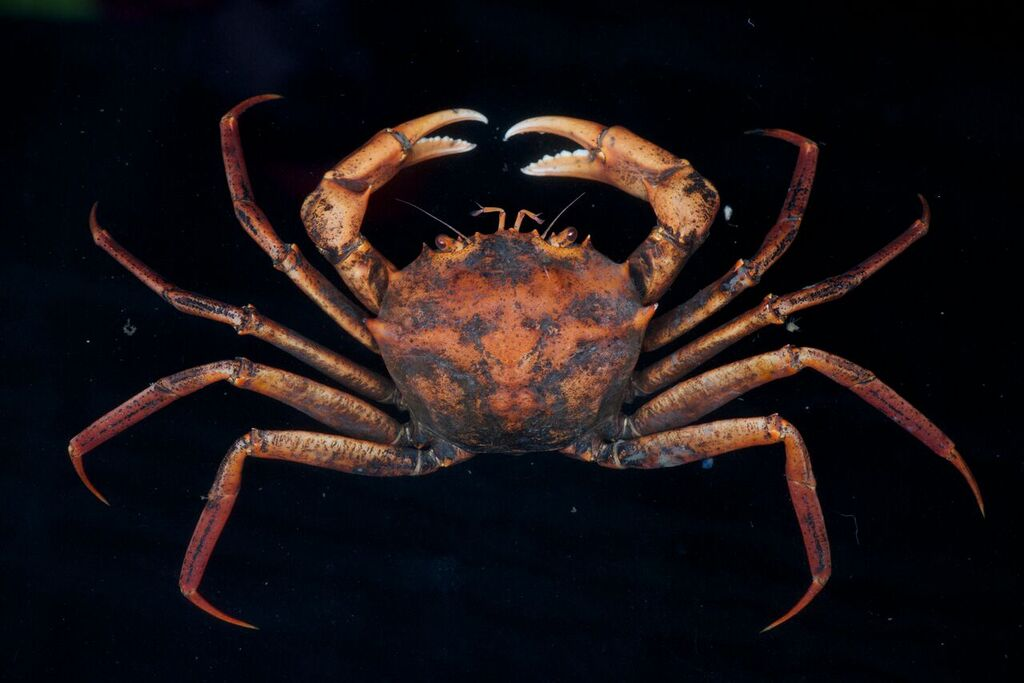
- Geryon trispinosus

Scientific classification
- Kingdom: Animalia
- Phylum: Arthropoda
- Class: Malacostraca
- Order: Decapoda
- Suborder: Pleocyemata
- Infraorder: Brachyura
- Family: Geryonidae
- Genus: Geryon; Krøyer, 1837

= Geryon (crab) =

Genus of crabs

Geryon is a genus of crabs belonging to the family Geryonidae.

The species of this genus are found in Europe and Northern America.

Species:

- Geryon longipes Milne-Edwards, 1882
- Geryon trispinosus (Herbst, 1803)
