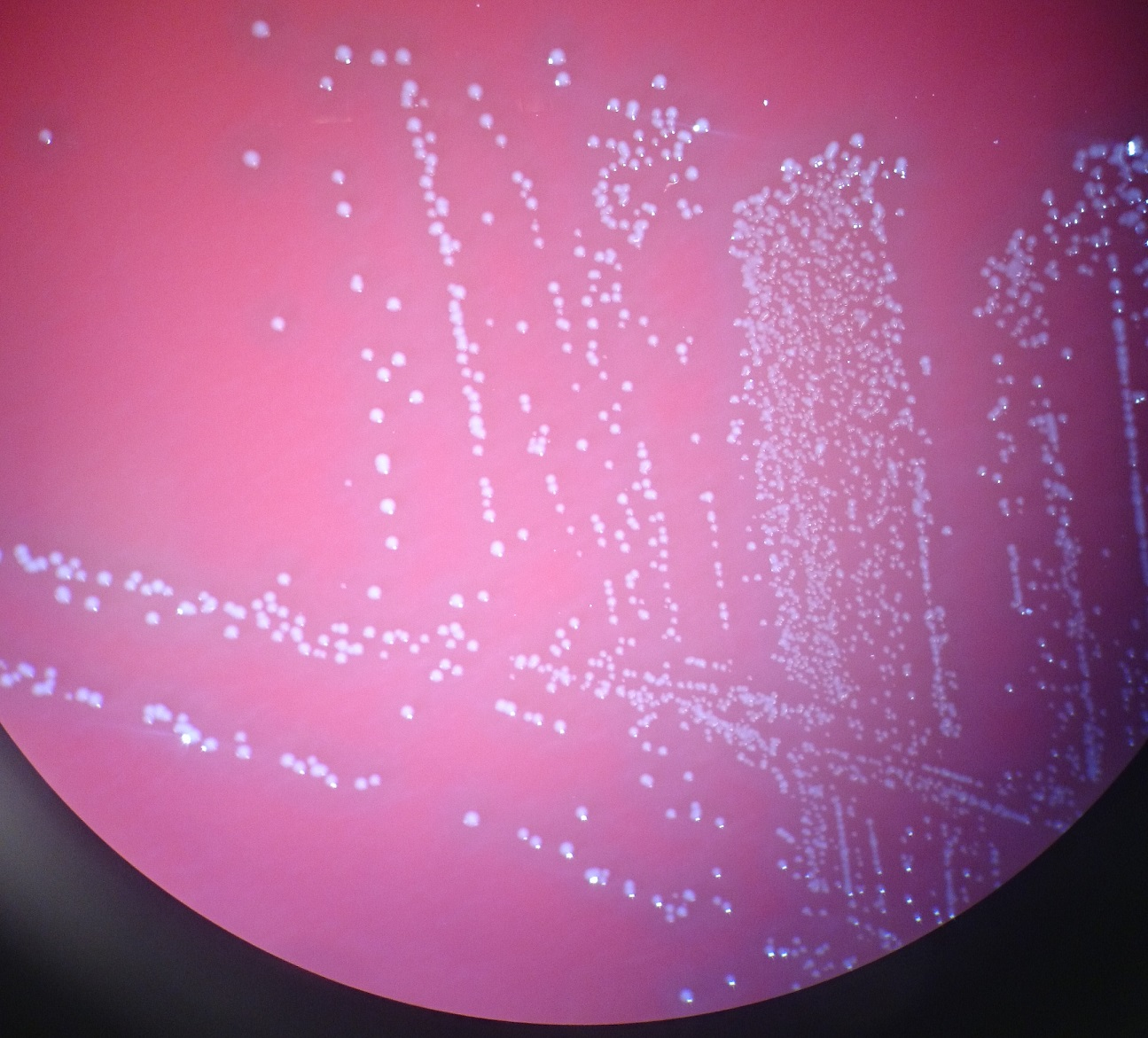

Scientific classification
- Domain: Bacteria
- Kingdom: Bacillati
- Phylum: Bacillota
- Class: Bacilli
- Order: Lactobacillales
- Family: Aerococcaceae
- Genus: Aerococcus; Williams et al., 1953

Type species
- A. viridans Williams et al., 1953

= Aerococcus =

Genus of bacteria

Aerococcus, from Ancient Greek ἀήρ (aḗr), meaning "air", and κόκκος (kókkos), meaning "berry", is a genus of bacterium in the phylum Bacillota (Bacteria). The genus was first identified in 1953 from samples of air and dust as a catalase-negative, gram-positive coccus that grew in small clusters. They were subsequently found in hospital environments and meat-curing brines. It has been difficult to identify as it resembles alpha-hemolytic Streptococcus on blood agar plates and is difficult to identify by biochemical means. Sequencing of 16S rRNA has become the gold standard for identification, but other techniques such as MALDI-TOF have also been useful for identifying both the genus and species.

== Etymology ==
The name Aerococcus derives from Ancient Greek ἀήρ (aḗr), meaning "air", and κόκκος (kókkos), meaning "berry". The name was given based on its round shape and that it was first discovered in air samples.

== Species ==
The genus contains these species:

- A. christensenii Collins et al., 1999, named after the Danish microbiologist Jens J. Christensen
- A. sanguinicola Lawson et al., 2001 (from the Latin for blood-dweller)
- A. suis Vela et al., 2007 (Latin for "of a hog")
- A. urinae Aguirre & Collins, 1992 (Latin for "of urine")
- A. urinaeequi (Garvie, 1988) Felis et al., 2005 (Latin for "of the urine of a horse", source of isolation of the type strain)
- A. urinaehominis Lawson et al., 2001 (Latin for "of the urine of a human", source of isolation of the type strain)
- A. viridans Williams et al., 1953 – type species of the genus (Latin for "making green", producing a green color). Causative agent of gaffkaemia, a disease of lobsters.

== See also ==
- Bacterial taxonomy
- Microbiology
