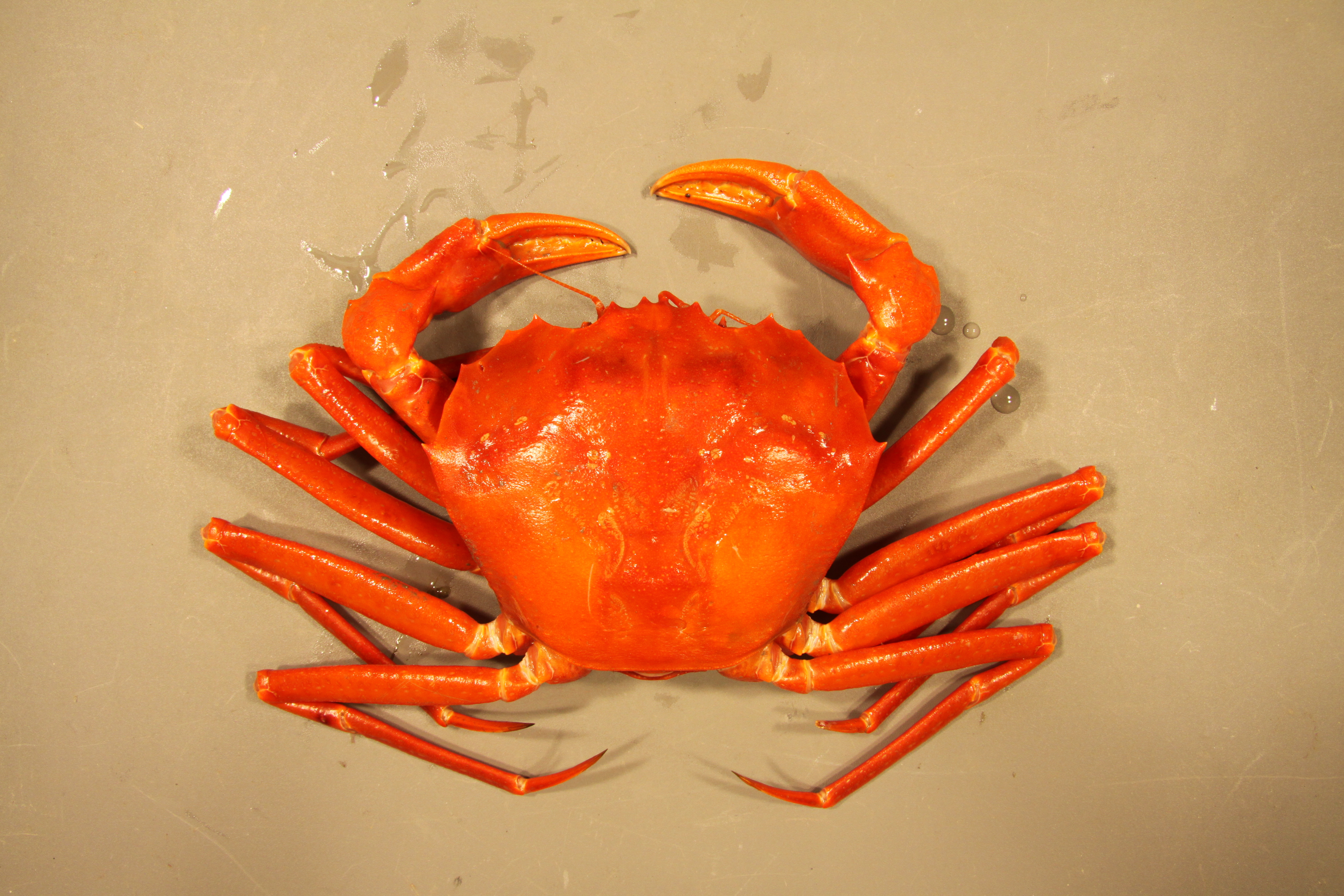
- Dorsal view of male red deep-sea crab, Chaceon quinquedens (Brad Stevens)

Scientific classification
- Kingdom: Animalia
- Phylum: Arthropoda
- Class: Malacostraca
- Order: Decapoda
- Suborder: Pleocyemata
- Infraorder: Brachyura
- Family: Geryonidae
- Genus: Chaceon
- Species: C. quinquedens

Binomial name
- Chaceon quinquedens (Smith, 1879)

Synonyms
- Geryon quinquedens Smith, 1879

= Chaceon quinquedens =

Species of crab

Chaceon quinquedens, commonly known as the red deep-sea crab, but sold as Atlantic deep sea red crab, or simply Atlantic red crab or red crab, is a crab that lives in the Atlantic Ocean off the East Coast of the United States and Canada, from North Carolina to Nova Scotia, and in the Gulf of Mexico.

== Distinction ==
The deep sea red-crab (DSRC) species resembles a snow crab from Alaska. However, they are actually members of the superfamily Portunoidea, or swimming crabs, so are more closely related to blue crabs Callinectes sapidus, although they do not have the flattened fifth leg characteristic of that species. According to the Virginia Marine Products Board, the average weight of marketed crabs is about one to two pounds, and the average size is "5 to 7 inches (12.5 –17.5 cm) across the back of the shell."

== Distribution and ecology ==
Red deep sea crabs (DSRC) mostly inhabit the deep continental shelf and slope along a wide range, all the way from the Northwest Atlantic waters and from the Gulf of Maine to the Gulf of Mexico. They can be found at depths of 200 to 1,800 metres (660 to 5,910 ft). DSRC on the U.S. East Coast show distinct sex segregation by depth along the continental slope. Females predominate at depths of 450–700 metres (1,480–2,300 ft), and those in shallow water are predominantly reproductive adults. Females are smaller in size with a maximum carapace width of about 120 millimetres (4.7 in). whereas males predominate at greater depths, and are much larger in carapace width of 180 millimetres (7.1 in). Males can also live up to 15 years and will continue to grow with age. Furthermore, crabs in deeper water tend to be smaller than those in shallow water. This distribution suggests that red deep sea crabs undergo ontogenetic (life-cycle) migration. In a tag experiment that lasted for seven years, it was found that between the depths of 275 to 1,100 metres (902 to 3,609 ft) the red deep sea crabs moved distances of greater than 20 metres (66 ft). In this scenario, females on the upper slope (above 600 m) release larvae that migrate to surface waters, then settle in water deeper than 1000 m. As they grow, they move upslope and eventually become mature in shallower water. Red deep sea crabs living in the Gulf of Mexico, however, do not demonstrate a similar distribution; both large and small crabs are found from 500 to 1950 m, and no relationship with depth was found for sex or size.

== Reproduction and development ==
Mature deep sea red crabs (DSRC) adults will usually migrate towards the upper slopes of the continental shelf for reproduction, there is also other favorable factors such as warmer temperatures, better abundance in prey, etc., that influence the adult crabs to migrate upwards that help with reproduction and dispersal. Females will also generally retain her eggs clutches up until the larvae are ready to hatch. The greatest seasonal dispersal range for the Deep sea red-crabs is during the winter months. The main stimulus for larvae to swim towards the surface is temperature, and as development proceeds the sinking rates of the crabs within their range increases. Like most crabs, the DSRC go through Brachyuran cold-water life cycle, have longer incubation times, longer total larval period, which result in larger adults. when the larvae hatch, they become planktonic for most of their early stages. the larvae typically hatch in the spring/summer months in shallow waters. DSRC larva develop in six stages: a pre-zoea stage, four zoeae stages, and a megalopa stage. The early stages of development (stages within the pre-zoea to the megalopa) happen within 26 days in cold water temperatures ranging from 18 to 21 °C, this also al occurs in shallower waters. After the early stages of development the juvenile crabs will continue growth in the mid slopes, the females will typically start to migrate toward to the upper slopes to join the adult females for mating, the males will typically start to migrate into deeper depths.

== Fishery ==
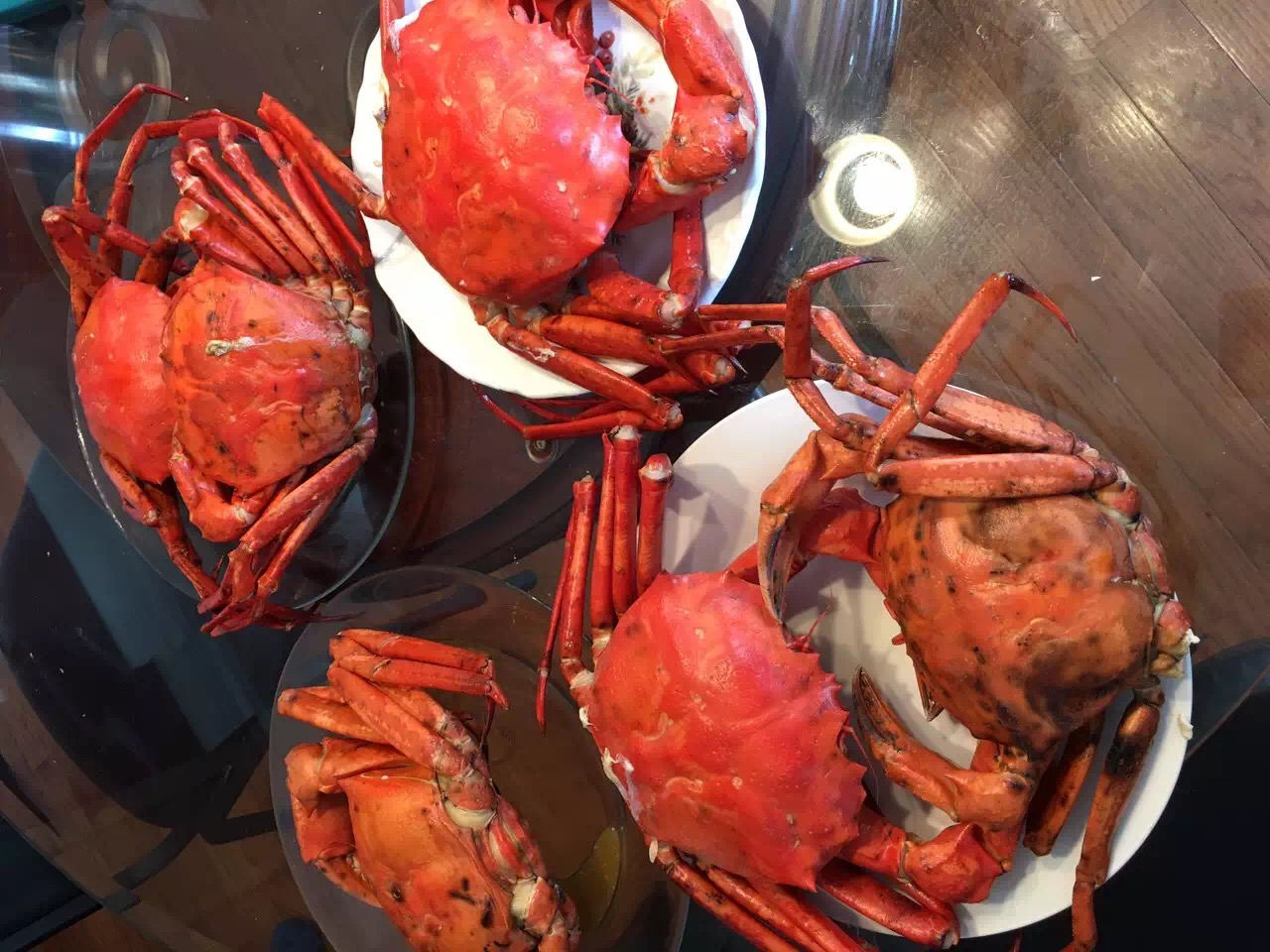
Cooked deep sea red-crabs from Virginia

The crab is commercially fished as food. Since 2002, the species has been managed under the Atlantic Deep-Sea Red Crab Fishery Management Plan (FMP) created by the New England Fishery Management council. The National Marine Fisheries Service has established an Acceptable Biological Catch (ABC) of 1,775 tons (3.91 million pounds) but average landings rarely exceed 930 tons (2.05 million pounds) and average value of landings in 2016-2018 was $3.29 Million. After a decrease in other larger crustacean species, there became an increased interest in the deep sea red-crab fishery. The main target of the fishery are the legs and attached body segments. In 2008 the fishery was visited again, since the original look in 1972, it was found that the fishery abundance had decreased by 42%, this was shown most evident in the regions most accessible by the deeper depth fisheries fleet.

== Other information ==
Red deep-sea crabs can develop a shell disease. This disease looks like small or large black and grey spots on the shell. These are caused by bacteria and fungi that are contagious to other crustaceans.
