= Aerococcus viridans =

Scientific classification
- Domain: Bacteria
- Kingdom: Bacillati
- Phylum: Bacillota
- Class: Bacilli
- Order: Lactobacillales
- Family: Aerococcaceae
- Genus: Aerococcus
- Species: A. viridans

Binomial name
- Aerococcus viridans Williams et al., 1953

Species of bacterium

Aerococcus viridans is a member of the bacterial genus Aerococcus. It is a causative agent of gaffkaemia, a disease of lobsters, and is used as a commercial source for lactate oxidase.
