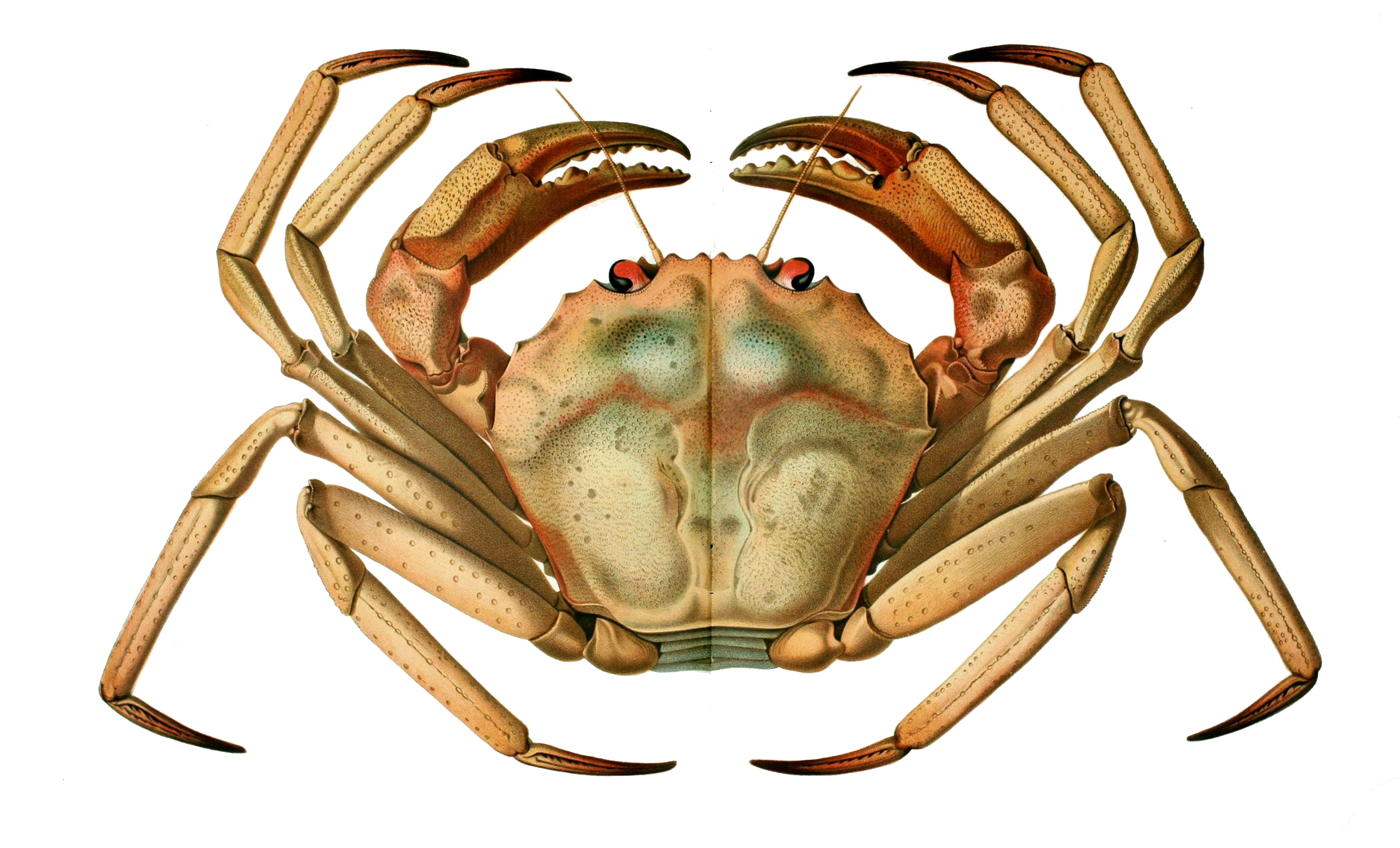
- Chaceon affinis

Scientific classification
- Domain: Eukaryota
- Kingdom: Animalia
- Phylum: Arthropoda
- Class: Malacostraca
- Order: Decapoda
- Suborder: Pleocyemata
- Infraorder: Brachyura
- Family: Geryonidae
- Genus: Chaceon; Manning & Holthuis, 1989

Species
- See text

= Chaceon =

Genus of crabs

Chaceon is a crab genus in the family Geryonidae, and was first described in 1989 by Raymond Manning and Lipke Holthuis.

== Species ==
- Chaceon affinis (A. Milne-Edwards & Bouvier, 1894)
- Chaceon albus Davie, Ng & Dawson, 2007
- Chaceon alcocki Ghosh & Manning, 1993
- Chaceon atopus Manning & Holthuis, 1989
- Chaceon australis Manning, 1993
- Chaceon bicolor Manning & Holthuis, 1989
- Chaceon chilensis Chirino-Gálvez & Manning, 1989
- Chaceon chuni (Macpherson, 1983)
- Chaceon collettei Manning, 1992
- Chaceon crosnieri Manning & Holthuis, 1989
- Chaceon eldorado Manning & Holthuis, 1989
- Chaceon erytheiae (Macpherson, 1984)
- Chaceon fenneri (Manning & Holthuis, 1984)
- Chaceon gordonae (Ingle, 1985)
- Chaceon goreni Galil & Manning, 2001
- Chaceon granulatus (Sakai, 1978)
- †Chaceon heimertingensis (Bachmayer & Wagner, 1957)
- †Chaceon helmstedtense (Bachmayer & Mundlos, 1968)
- Chaceon imperialis Manning, 1992
- Chaceon inghami (Manning & Holthuis, 1986)
- Chaceon inglei Manning & Holthuis, 1989
- Chaceon karubar Manning, 1993
- Chaceon linsi Tavares & Pinheiro, 2011
- Chaceon macphersoni (Manning & Holthuis, 1988)
- Chaceon manningi Ng, Lee & Yu, 1994
- †Chaceon marcorilobus Feldmann, Schweitzer & Casadío, 2023
- Chaceon maritae (Manning & Holthuis, 1981)
- †Chaceon matsushimai Kato & Koizumi, 2001
- Chaceon mediterraneus Manning & Holthuis, 1989
- Chaceon micronesicus Ng & Manning, 1998
- †Chaceon miocenicus Fraaije, Hansen & Hansen, 2005
- Chaceon notialis Manning & Holthuis, 1989
- Chaceon paulensis (Chun, 1903)
- †Chaceon peruvianus (d'Orbigny, 1842)
- Chaceon poupini Manning, 1992
- †Chaceon quadrata Feldmann, Schweitzer & Encinas, 2010
- Chaceon quinquedens (Smith, 1879)
- Chaceon ramosae Manning, Tavares & Albuquerque, 1989
- Chaceon sanctaehelenae Mannig & Holthuis, 1989
- Chaceon somaliensis Manning, 1993
- Chaceon yaldwyni Manning, Dawson & Webber, 1990
