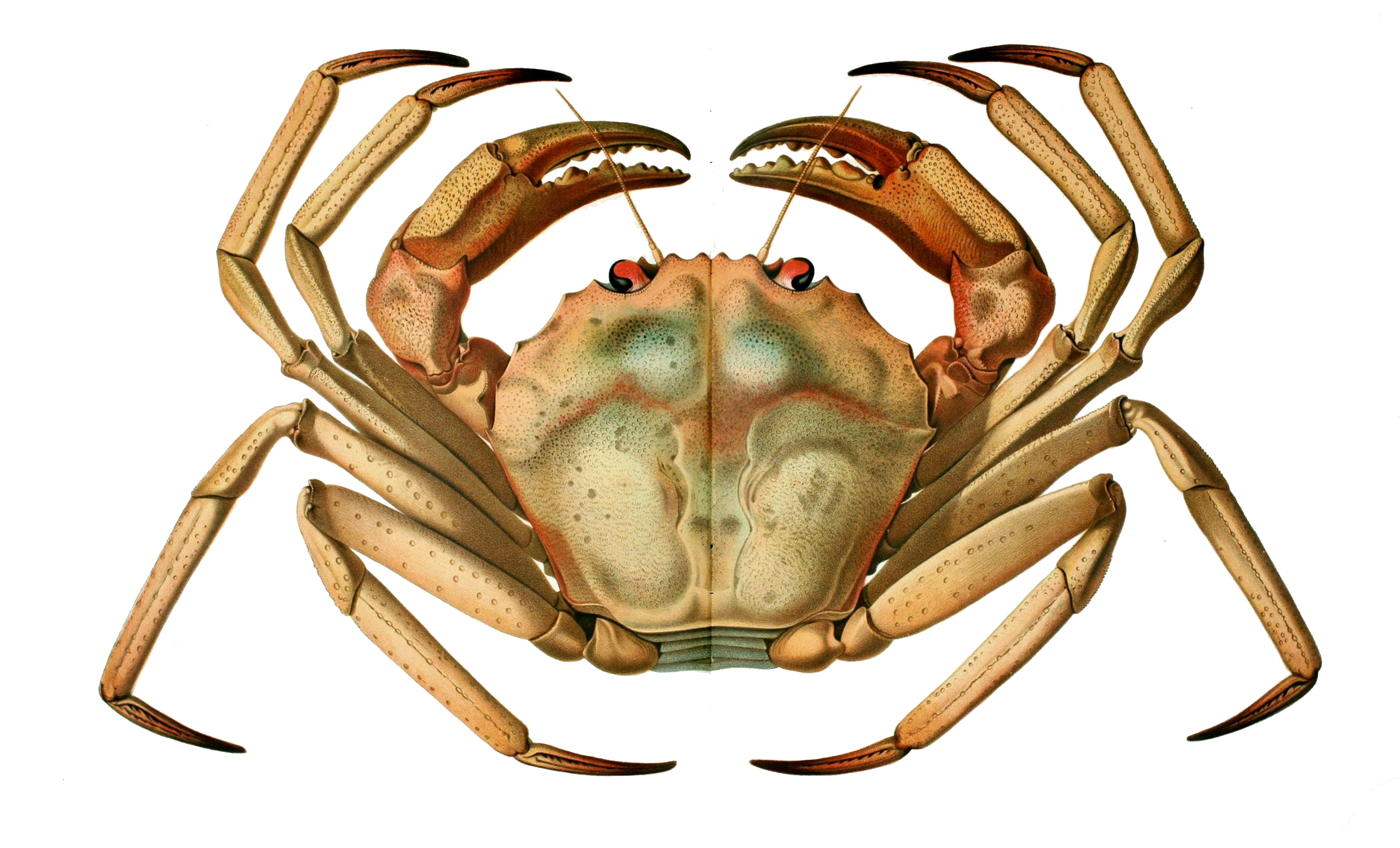
- Chaceon affinis

Scientific classification
- Kingdom: Animalia
- Phylum: Arthropoda
- Clade: Pancrustacea
- Class: Malacostraca
- Order: Decapoda
- Suborder: Pleocyemata
- Infraorder: Brachyura
- Superfamily: Portunoidea
- Family: Geryonidae; Colosi, 1924

= Geryonidae =

Family of crabs

Geryonidae is a family of crabs, including the following subfamilies and genera:

- Benthochasconinae Spiridonov, Neretina & Schepetov, 2014
  - Benthochascon Alcock & Anderson, 1899
  - Raymanninus Ng, 2000
- † Coeloma A. Milne-Edwards, 1865
- Coenophthalmus A. Milne-Edwards, 1879
- Echonilatus Davie & Crosnier, 2006
- Geryoninae Colosi, 1924
  - † Archaeoplax Stimpson, 1863
  - Chaceon Manning & Holthuis, 1989
  - Geryon Krøyer, 1837
  - Zariquieyon Manning & Holthuis, 1989
- † Litoricola Woodward, 1873
- Nectocarcinus A. Milne-Edwards, 1860
- † Pyrenicola Artal & Ossó, 2024
