= Scissor grinder (disambiguation) =

A scissor grinder is an antiquated term for a scissor or knife sharpener.

It may also refer to:

- Scissor grinder cicada, a common name for certain species of Neotibicen, a genus of cicadas, in reference to the sound of their mating calls:
  - Neotibicen pruinosus, or "Scissor grinder"
  - Neotibicen latifasciatus, or "Coastal scissor grinder"
  - Neotibicen winnemanna, or "Eastern scissor grinder"
