= Scissor grinder cicada =

Scissor grinder cicada may refer to:

- Neotibicen pruinosus, or "Scissor grinder"
- Neotibicen latifasciatus, or "Coastal scissor grinder"
- Neotibicen winnemanna, or "Eastern scissor grinder"
