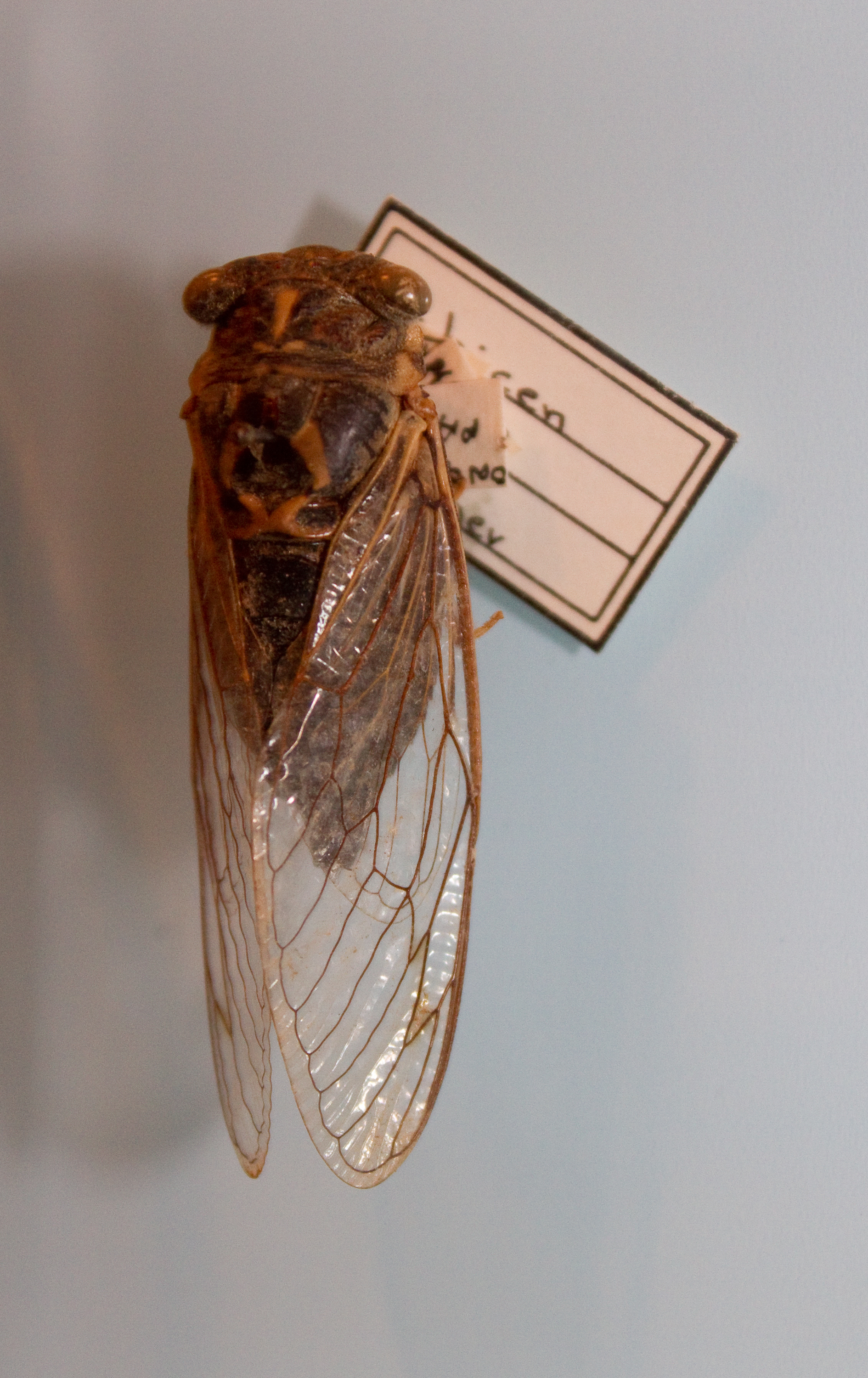

Scientific classification
- Kingdom: Animalia
- Phylum: Arthropoda
- Clade: Pancrustacea
- Class: Insecta
- Order: Hemiptera
- Suborder: Auchenorrhyncha
- Family: Cicadidae
- Genus: Neotibicen
- Species: †N. bermudianus

Binomial name
- †Neotibicen bermudianus (Verrill, 1902)

Synonyms
- Tibicen bermudianus Verrill, 1902

= Neotibicen bermudianus =

Species of true bug

Neotibicen bermudianus, also colloquially known as the Bermuda cicada, is an extinct species of annual cicada that was endemic to the island of Bermuda.

== Taxonomy ==
Neotibicen lyricen, the lyric cicada, of the Eastern United States is the most closely related species of Neotibicen behaviorally, morphologically, and genetically to the Bermuda cicada.

== Extinction ==
Populations of this species were historically abundant on Bermuda, but they plummeted sharply in the middle 20th century after the decline of their preferred host, the Bermuda cedar.
