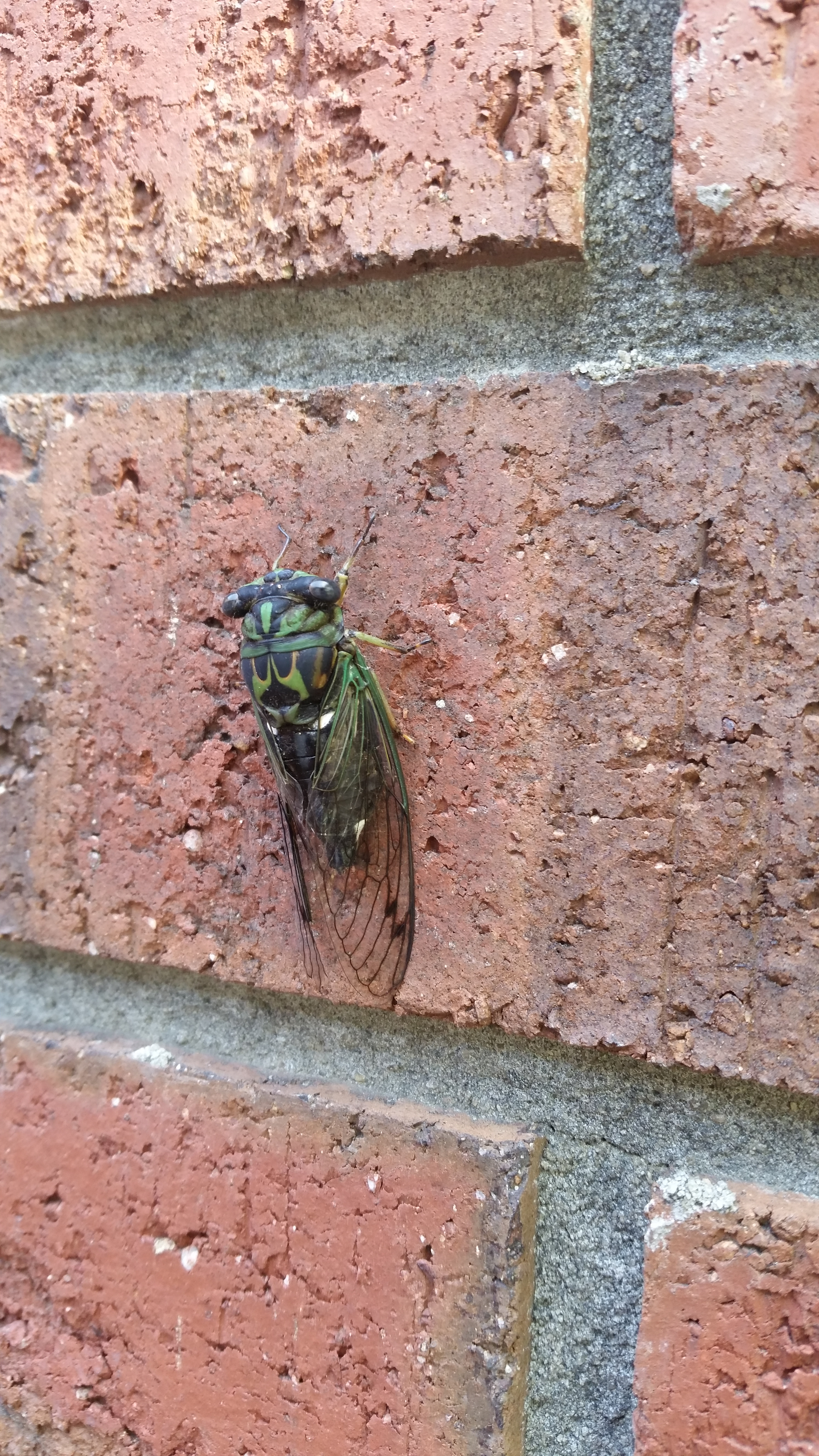
- Neotibicen robinsonianus specimen in North Carolina

Scientific classification
- Kingdom: Animalia
- Phylum: Arthropoda
- Clade: Pancrustacea
- Class: Insecta
- Order: Hemiptera
- Suborder: Auchenorrhyncha
- Family: Cicadidae
- Genus: Neotibicen
- Species: N. robinsonianus

Binomial name
- Neotibicen robinsonianus (Davis, 1922)

Synonyms
- Tibicen robinsonianus Davis, 1922

= Neotibicen robinsonianus =

Species of true bug

Neotibicen robinsonianus, commonly called Robinson's cicada, is a species of large-bodied annual cicada in the genus Neotibicen. It is native to the Eastern United States.
