= Neotibicen similaris =

Scientific classification
- Kingdom: Animalia
- Phylum: Arthropoda
- Clade: Pancrustacea
- Class: Insecta
- Order: Hemiptera
- Suborder: Auchenorrhyncha
- Family: Cicadidae
- Genus: Neotibicen
- Species: N. similaris

Binomial name
- Neotibicen similaris (Smith and Grossbeck, 1907)

Synonyms
- Tibicen similaris Smith and Grossbeck, 1907

Species of true bug

Neotibicen similaris is a species of annual cicada in the genus Neotibicen. It is native to the southeastern United States. Initially, N. similaris encompassed one distinct species of Neotibicen, though Marshall and Hill described in 2017 an apparent subspecies of N. similaris native to the Apalachicola region of Florida, Georgia, and Alabama. The initial species described now consists the N. similaris subspecies N. similaris similaris, while the newly described variant occupies the N. similaris apalachicola subspecies. They are similar, and the most reliable means of distinguishing the subspecies is the distinctive call of N. similaris apalachicola males; however, despite the distinctness of the mating calls, the two subspecies appear to hybridize in areas in which they overlap, resulting in songs that combine elements of both.

== Subspecies ==
There are two subspecies belonging to the species Neotibicen similaris:

- Neotibicen similaris similaris (Smith and Grossbeck, 1907)^{g b} (similar dog-day cicada)
- Neotibicen similaris apalachicola Marshall and Hill, 2017^{g}

Data sources: g = GBIF, b = Bugguide.net
