= Neotibicen auriferus =

Scientific classification
- Kingdom: Animalia
- Phylum: Arthropoda
- Clade: Pancrustacea
- Class: Insecta
- Order: Hemiptera
- Suborder: Auchenorrhyncha
- Family: Cicadidae
- Genus: Neotibicen
- Species: N. auriferus

Binomial name
- Neotibicen auriferus (Say, 1825)

Synonyms
- Tibicen auriferus Say, 1825

Species of true bug

Neotibicen auriferus, commonly called field cicada, is a species of annual cicada in the genus Neotibicen.
