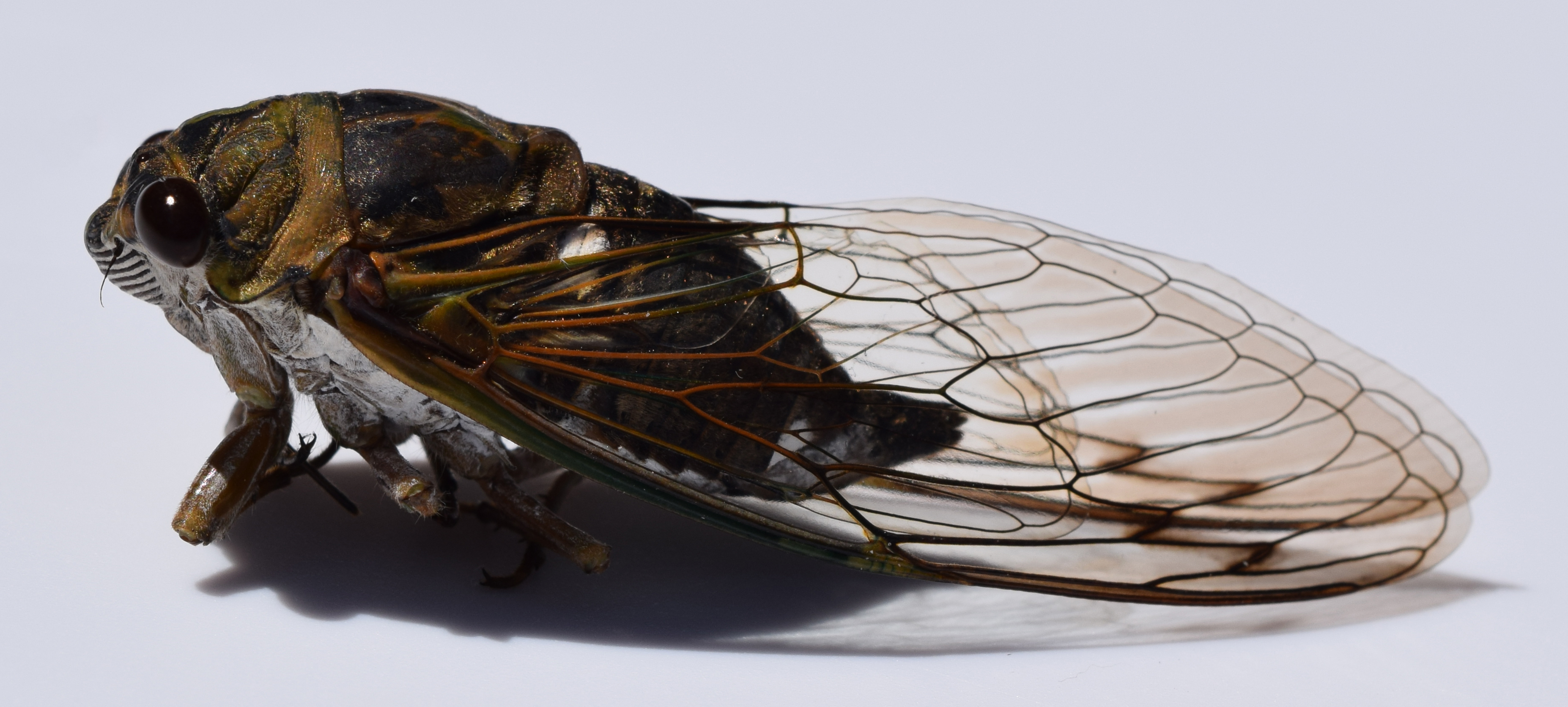

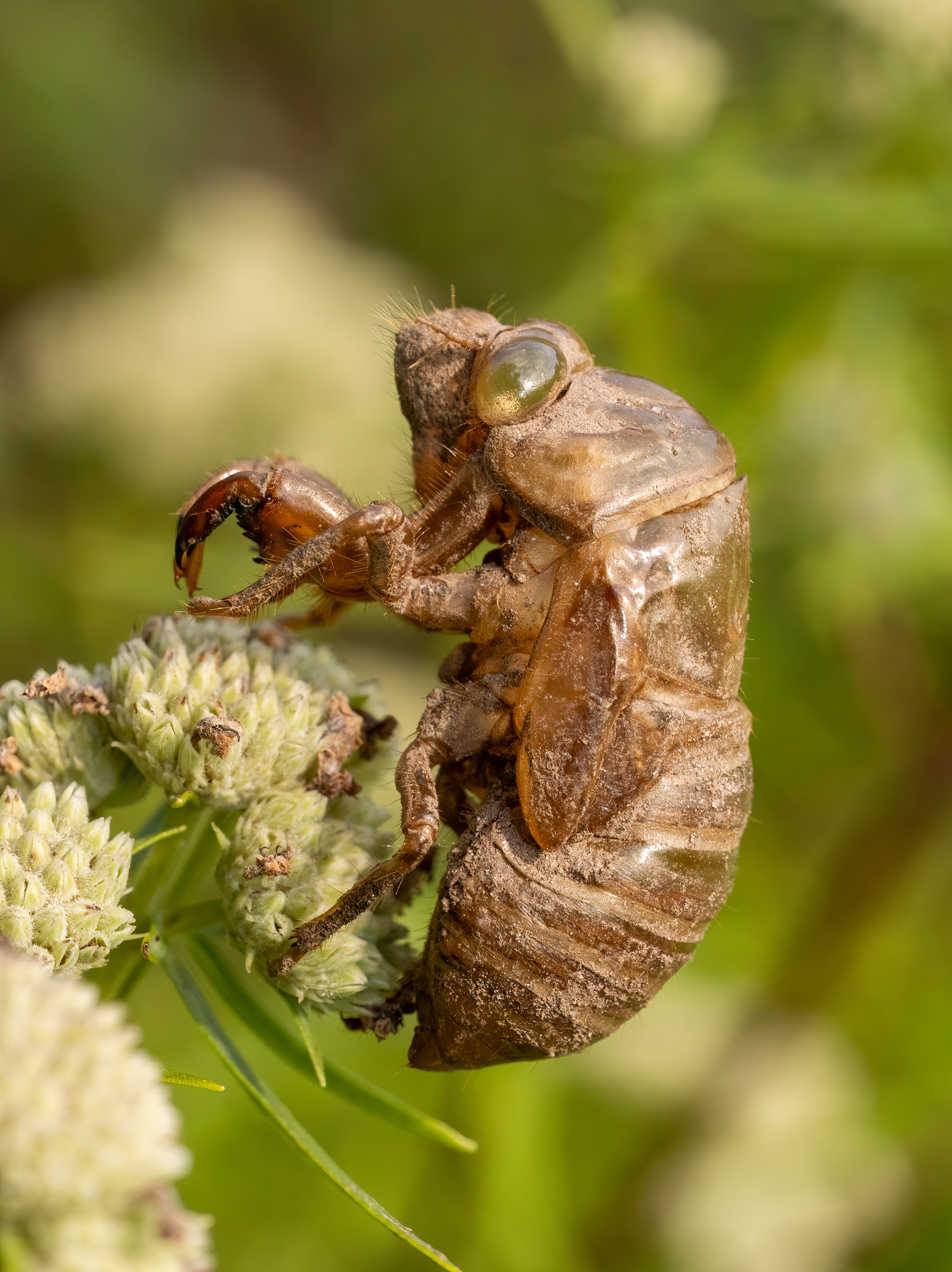
- Exuvia

Scientific classification
- Kingdom: Animalia
- Phylum: Arthropoda
- Clade: Pancrustacea
- Class: Insecta
- Order: Hemiptera
- Suborder: Auchenorrhyncha
- Family: Cicadidae
- Genus: Neotibicen
- Species: N. canicularis

Binomial name
- Neotibicen canicularis (Harris, 1841)

Synonyms
- Tibicen canicularis

Audio
- Song of Neotibicen canicularis, southern Ontario, Canada

= Dog-day cicada =

Species of true bug

Neotibicen canicularis, commonly called the dog-day cicada, dog-day harvestfly, or heatbug, is a species of annual cicada.

== Description ==
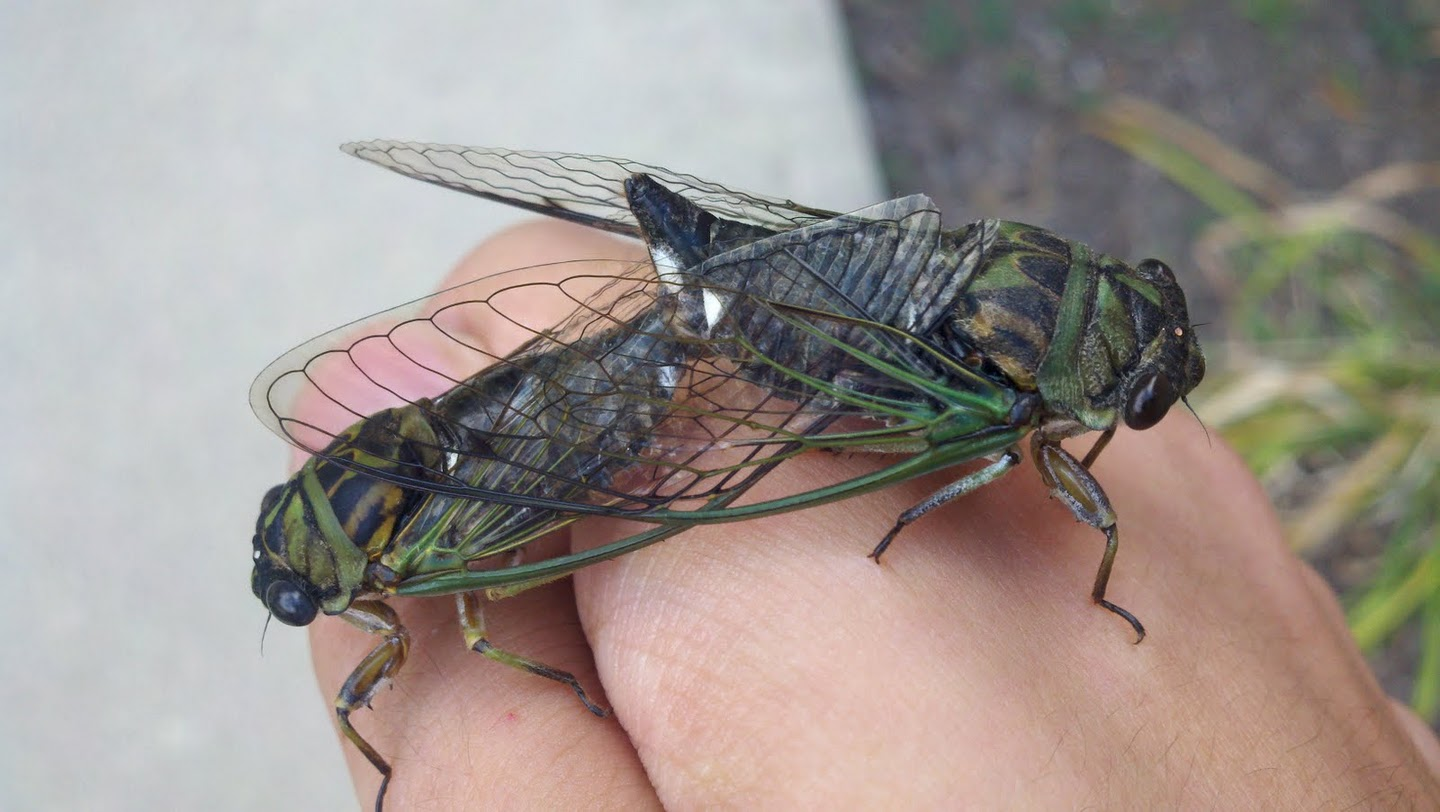
Two N. canicularis mating

Neotibicen canicularis is recognizable by being mostly black with green markings on its body. The body size is typically 27–33 millimeters (1.1–1.3 in); the wingspan can reach 82 mm (3.2 in). The wings are interlaced with green veins which are especially noticeable near the base. The song of N. canicularis is often described as being a loud, high-pitched whine much like a power saw cutting wood. It lasts for several seconds before fading away at the end of the noise. Its name "dog-day" refers to dog days of summer, due to these insects often being associated with hot, humid, summer days.

== Geographical locations ==
Common habitats are mixed and deciduous woods in Canada and the Central and Eastern United States. Geographic range includes The Great Plains of Canada and the United States, the Midwestern United States, The Great Lakes region, and New England.

== Gallery ==
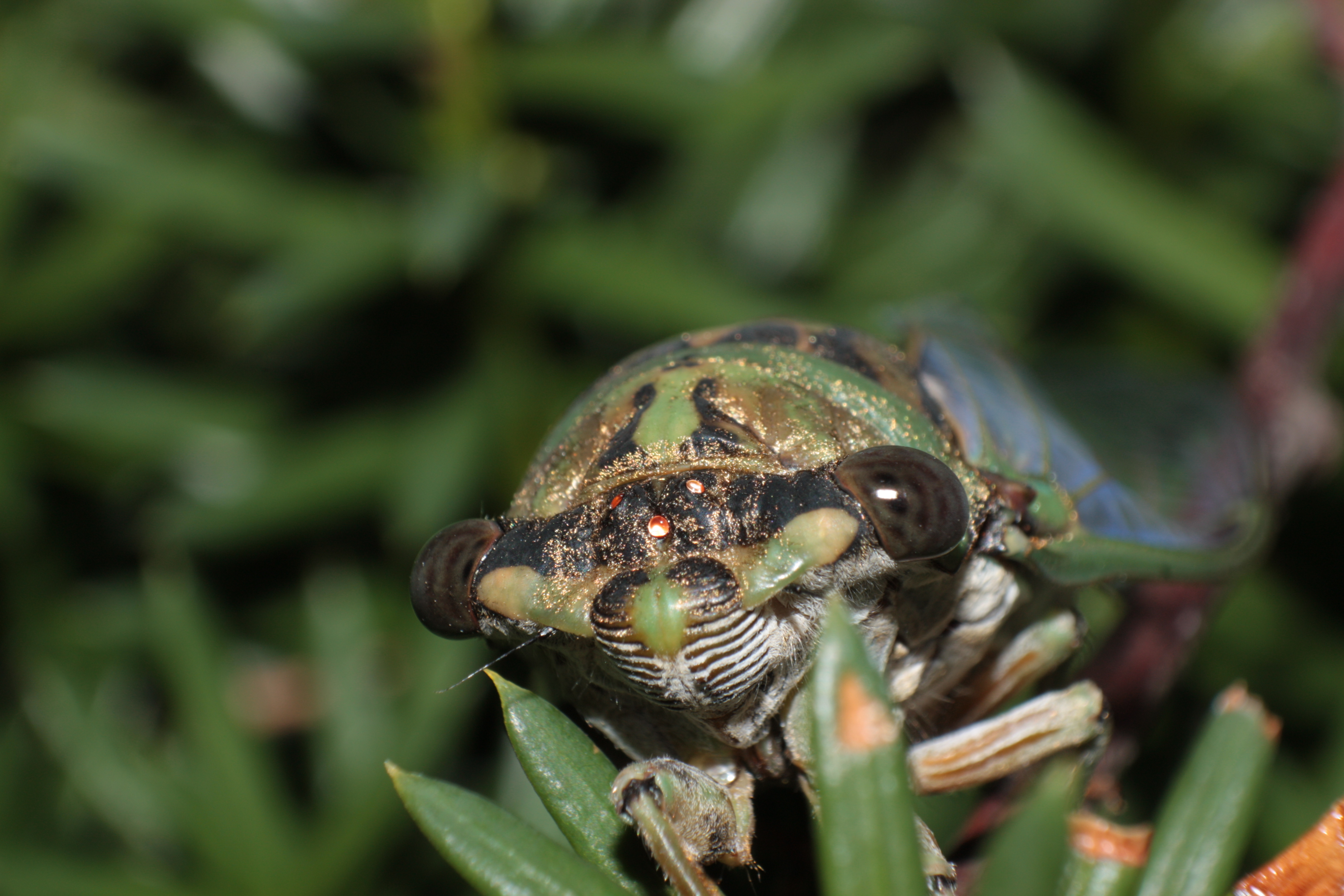
Close-up of face showing ocelli

Pinned N. canicularis from central Georgia, US

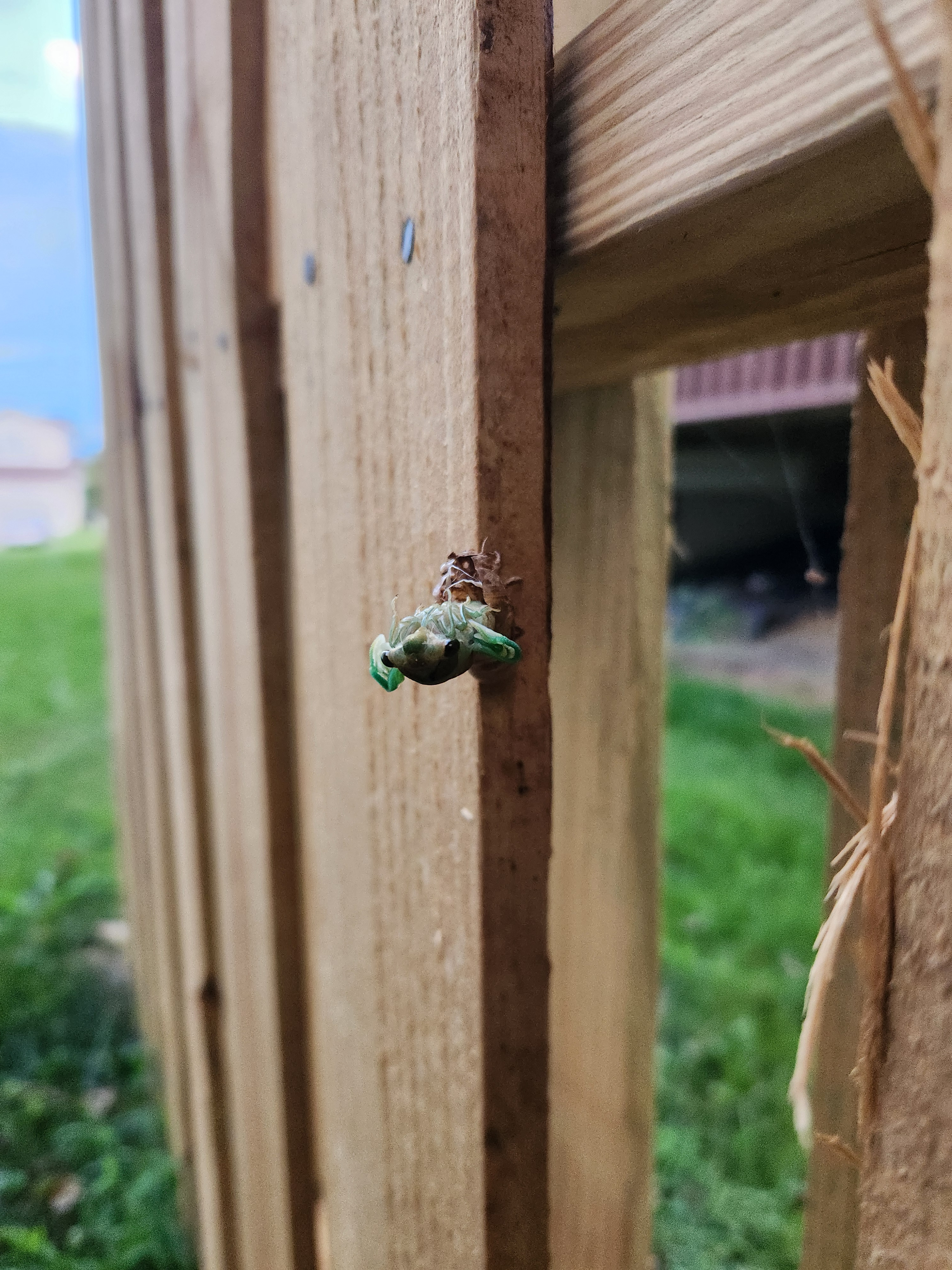
N. canicularis cicada moulting

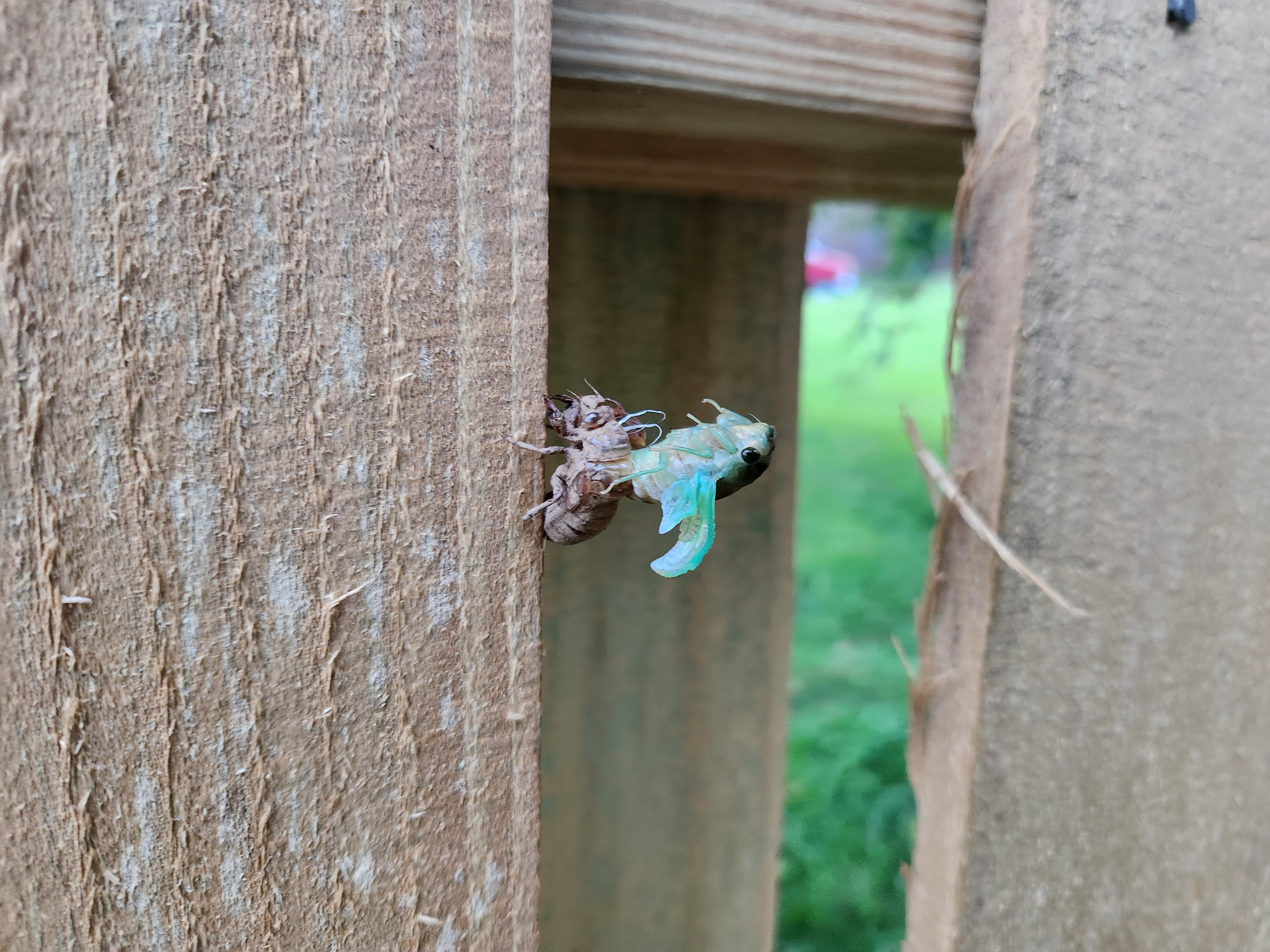
N. canicularis cicada moulting

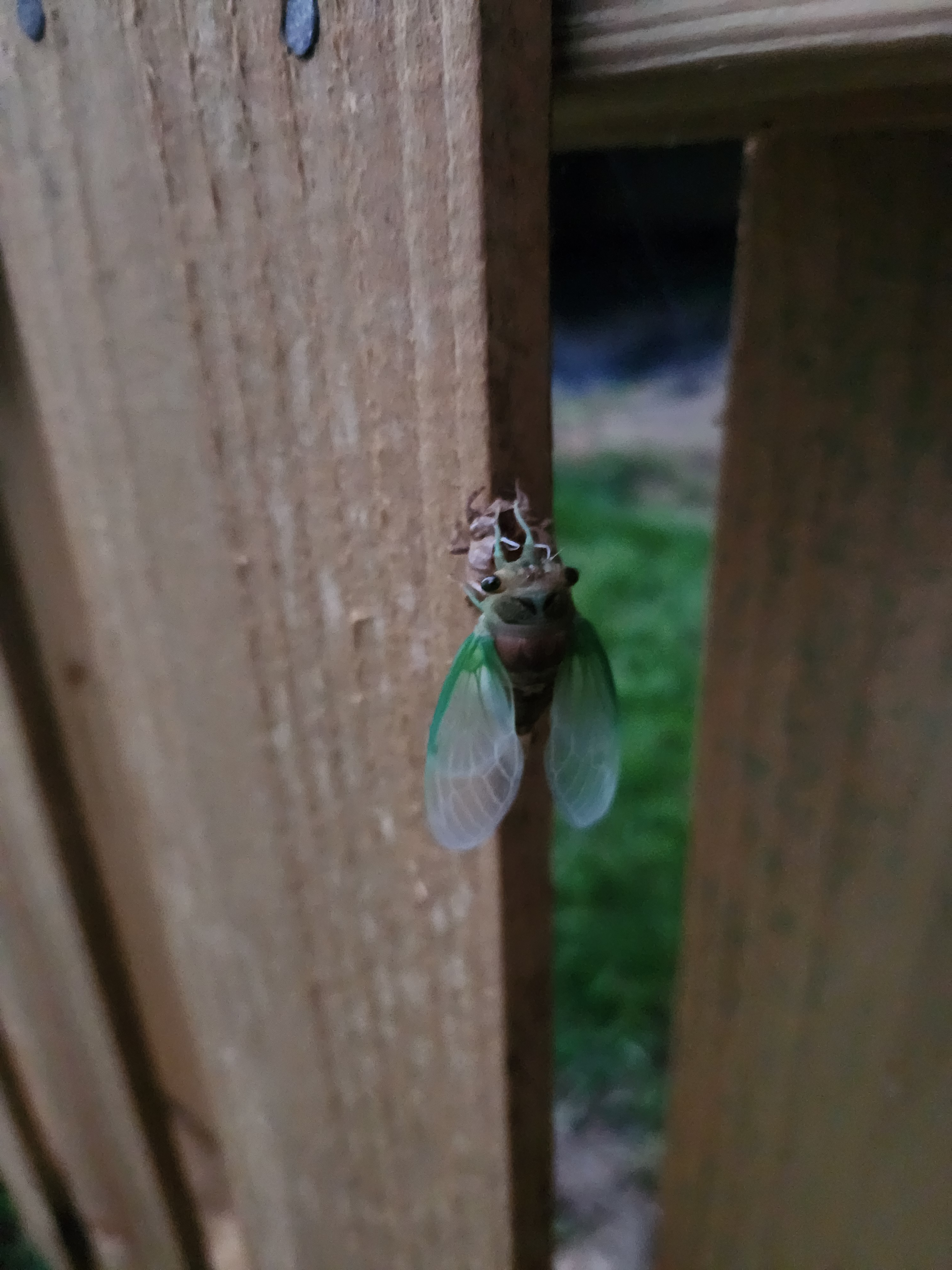
N. canicularis cicada moulting
