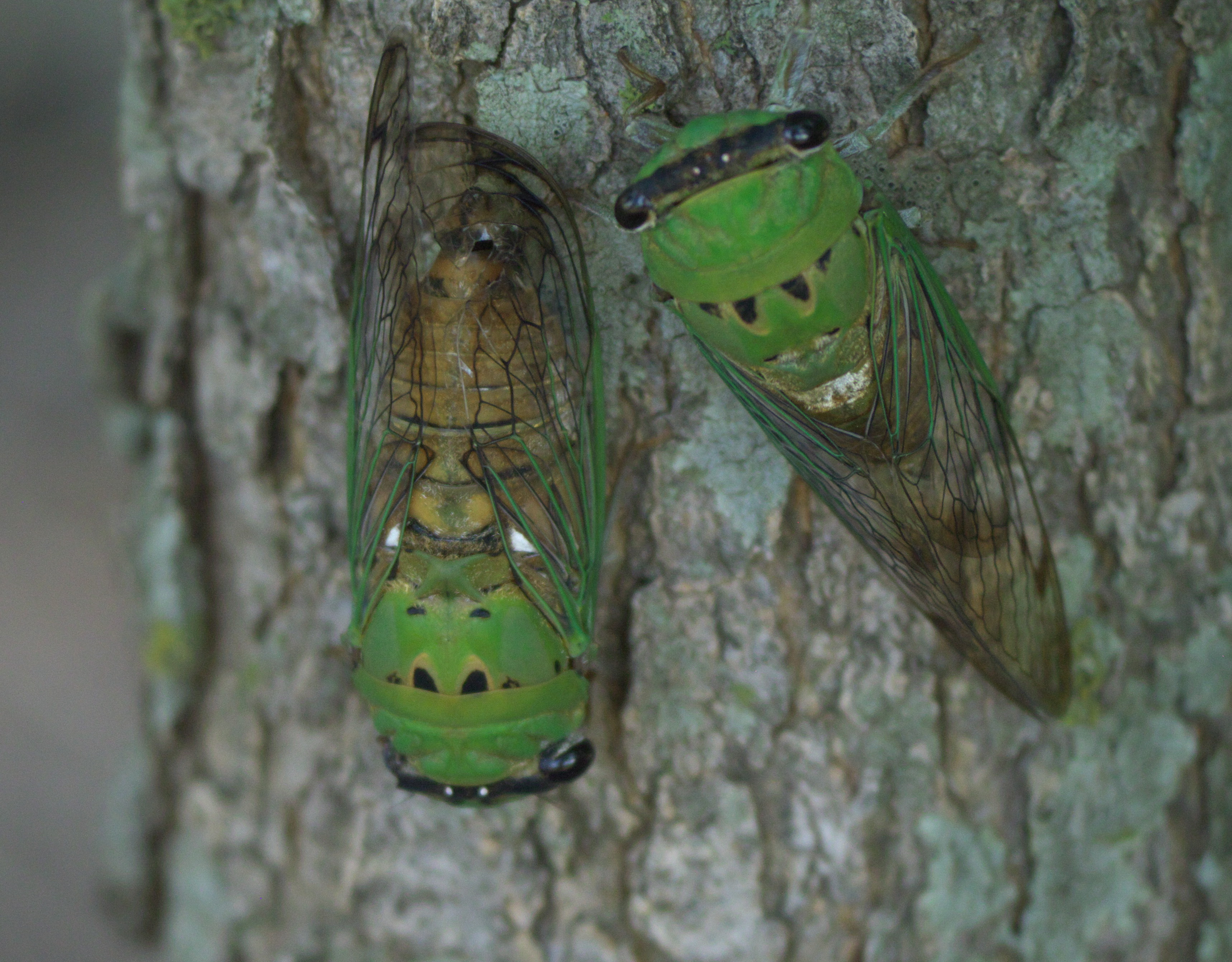

Scientific classification
- Kingdom: Animalia
- Phylum: Arthropoda
- Clade: Pancrustacea
- Class: Insecta
- Order: Hemiptera
- Suborder: Auchenorrhyncha
- Family: Cicadidae
- Genus: Neotibicen
- Species: N. superbus

Binomial name
- Neotibicen superbus (Fitch, 1855)

= Neotibicen superbus =

Species of true bug

Neotibicen superbus, the superb dog-day cicada, is a species of cicada in the family Cicadidae. It is the greenest cicada in the neotibicen genus. It has reduced black patterning and looks different than most other cicadas in its genus. Its song is a soft buzz that reaches a crescendo.

A single Neotibicen superbus cicada calling
Song, Texas, 2012
