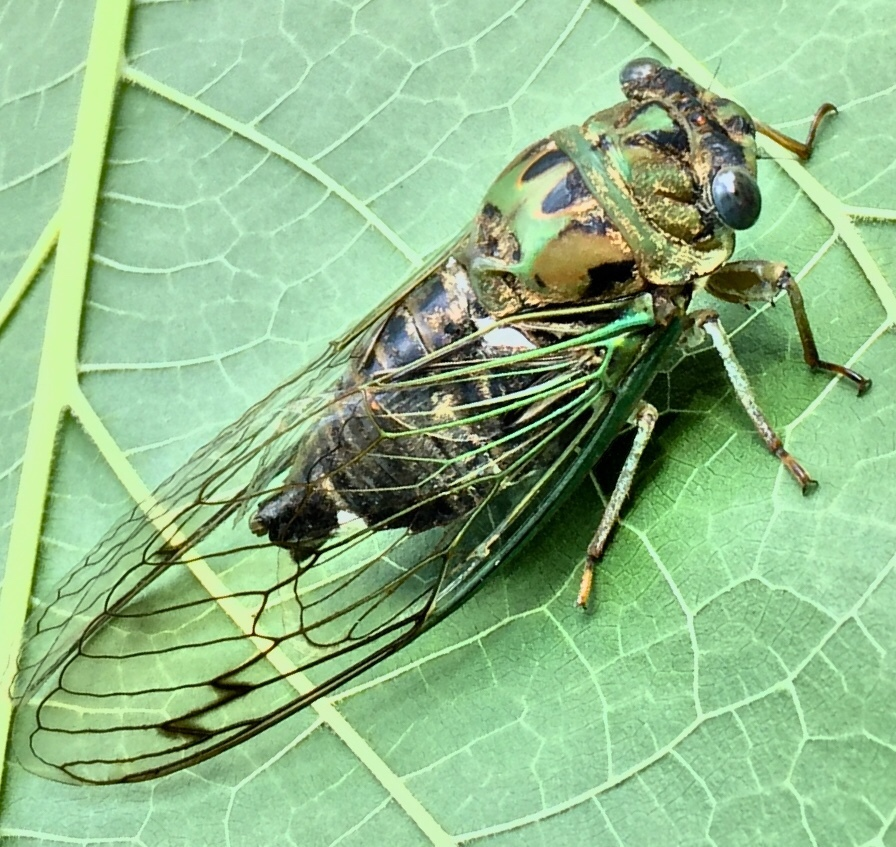
- Neotibicen winnemanna in North Carolina

Scientific classification
- Kingdom: Animalia
- Phylum: Arthropoda
- Clade: Pancrustacea
- Class: Insecta
- Order: Hemiptera
- Suborder: Auchenorrhyncha
- Family: Cicadidae
- Genus: Neotibicen
- Species: N. winnemanna

Binomial name
- Neotibicen winnemanna (Davis, 1912)

Synonyms
- Tibicen winnemanna Davis, 1912

= Neotibicen winnemanna =

Species of true bug

Neotibicen winnemanna, commonly called the Eastern scissor(s) grinder, is a species of large bodied annual cicada in the genus Neotibicen. It is native to the Eastern United States, particularly the Piedmont Plateau and the outlying lower mountainous elevations of the Appalachians and inner, western portion of the Atlantic coastal plain.

== Description ==
Neotibicen winnemanna is very similar to, but ultimately distinguished from, its midwestern and coastal counterparts, Neotibicen pruinosus and Neotibicen latifasciatus, respectively. The males of each of the three species share a highly similar mating call, characterized by a crescendo of continuous pulsation. A characteristic that can distinguish N. winnemanna from the other two similar-sounding scissor grinder cicadas is its range; N. winnemanna occupies a swath of land roughly approximating the Appalachian Mountains from southern New York in the north to northern Georgia and central Alabama to the south. N. winnemanna populations do not appear to be common in maritime forests or other coastal vegetation, distinguishing them from N. latifasciatus, though they may approach the inland coastal waterways of the East Coast of the United States, such as estuaries and bays. However, distinguishing from N. pruinosus may be more difficult, particularly in terms of range and in areas in the upper Southeastern United States in which certain populations of the two species may overlap, with potential gradations between N. winnemanna and N. pruinosus.

The call of N. winnemanna males itself is characterized by a loud, pulsating buzz lasting about twenty seconds per call with between one and two pulsations per second of alternating pitch interspersed and at a frequency that gradually crescendos until tapering off into a low, soft buzz. They commonly call from the upper branches of deciduous trees, particularly at dusk. N. winnemanna is an annual cicada, meaning they emerge from the ground each year, generally between June and September, with a peak generally in September.

Neotibicen winnemanna is typically distinct from Neotibicen linnei, Linne's cicada, the range of which overlaps somewhat with that of N. winnemanna, though Reynolds (2008) speculates that some of the physical characteristics of N. linnei, such as its bowing of the costae (the leading edges of its wings) and elongation of the opercula (the covers on its underside of its tympanae, or eardrums), are similar to those of N. winnemanna on account of possible hybridization between the species. As a result, suspected hybrid populations exist, though such hybridization has not been positively verified.

== See also ==
- Neotibicen pruinosus, the "scissor grinder"
- Neotibicen latifasciatus, the "coastal scissor grinder"
