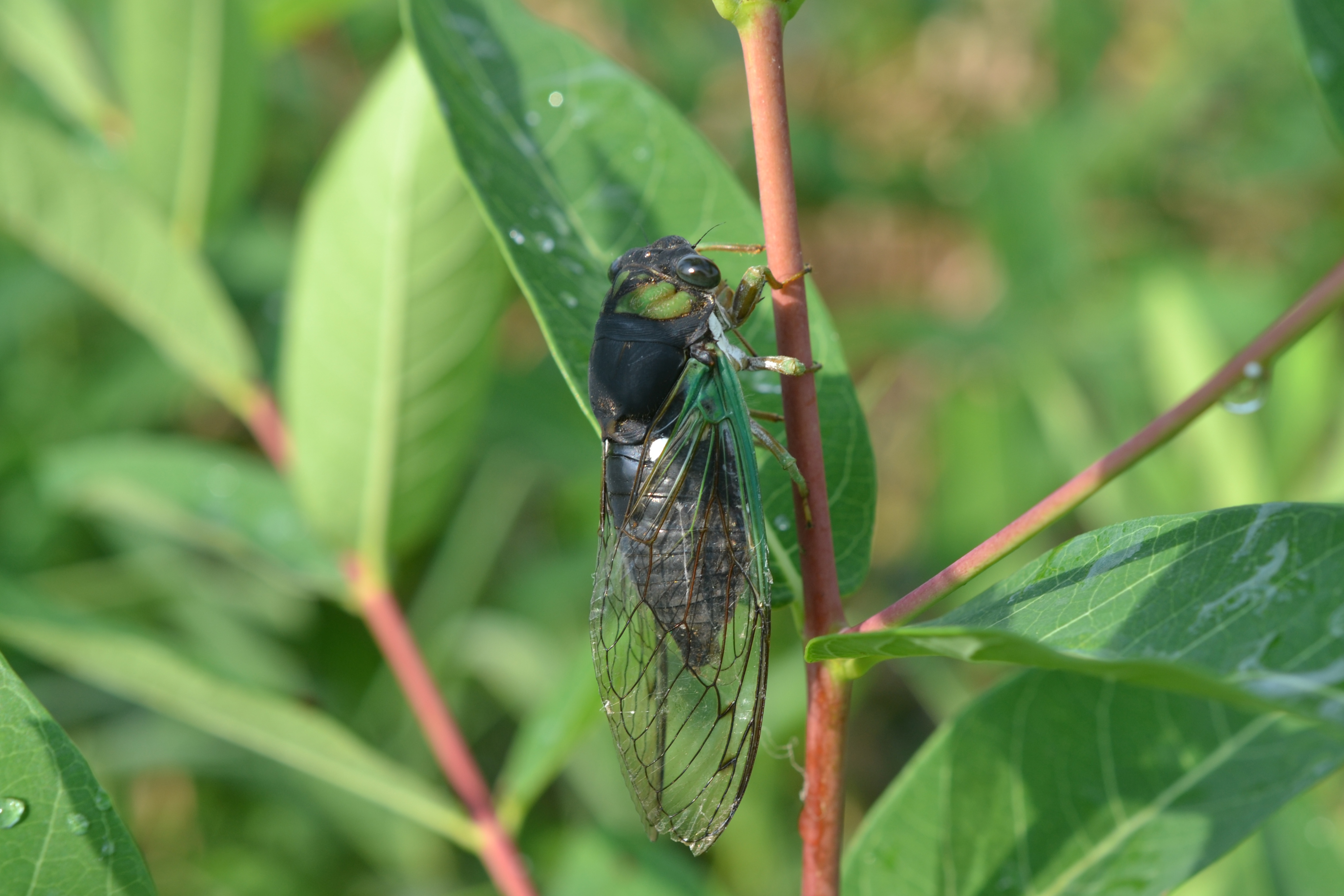

Scientific classification
- Kingdom: Animalia
- Phylum: Arthropoda
- Clade: Pancrustacea
- Class: Insecta
- Order: Hemiptera
- Suborder: Auchenorrhyncha
- Family: Cicadidae
- Genus: Neotibicen
- Species: N. tibicen

Binomial name
- Neotibicen tibicen (Linnaeus, 1758)

Subspecies
- Neotibicen tibicen tibicen (Linnaeus, 1758); Neotibicen tibicen australis (Davis, 1912)

Synonyms
- Cicada tibicen Linnaeus, 1758; Thopha chloromera Walker, 1850; Tibicen chloromerus (Walker, 1850); Cicada sayi Smith & Grossbeck, 1907

= Neotibicen tibicen =

Species of true bug

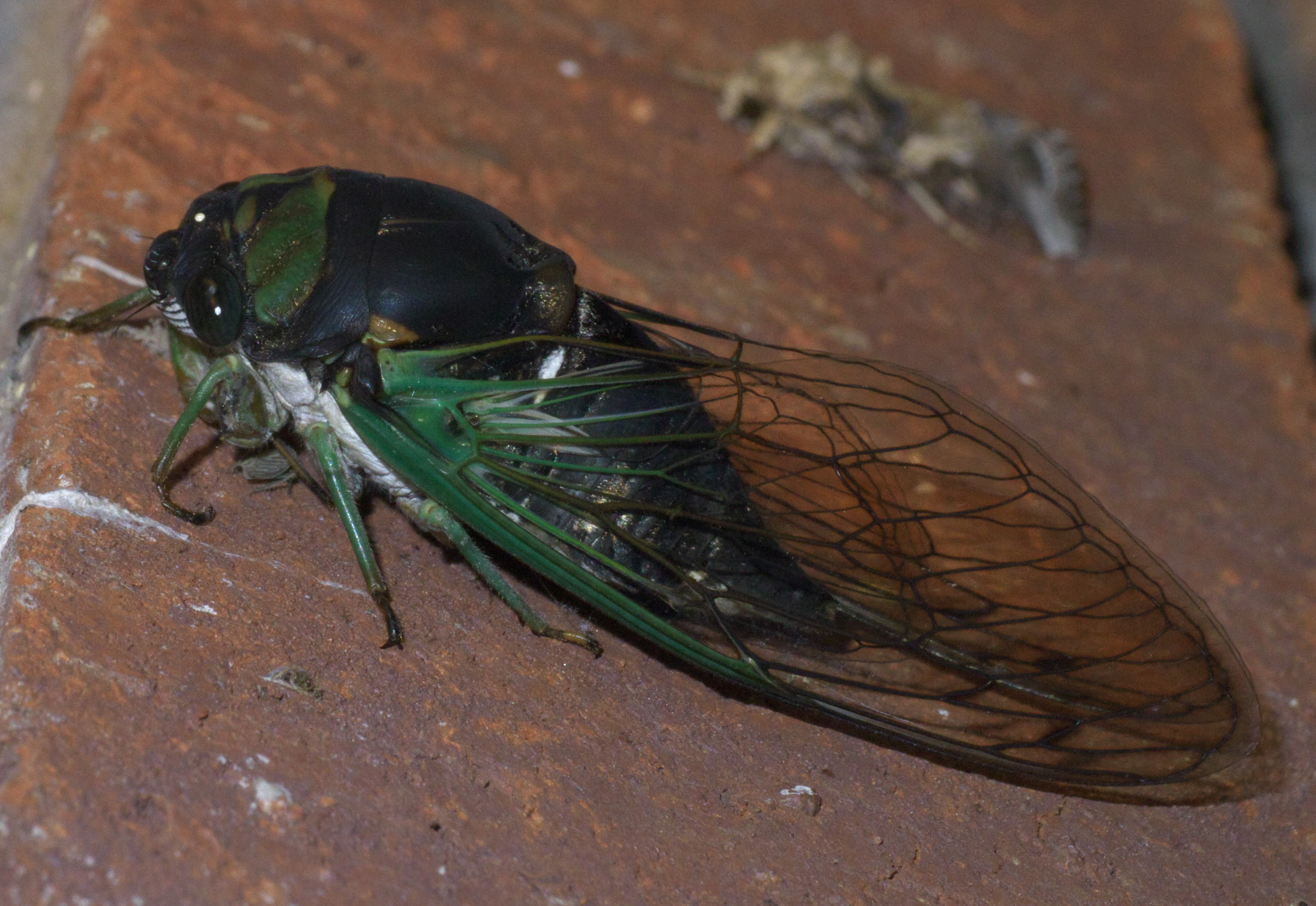
Swamp cicada, Neotibicen tibicen

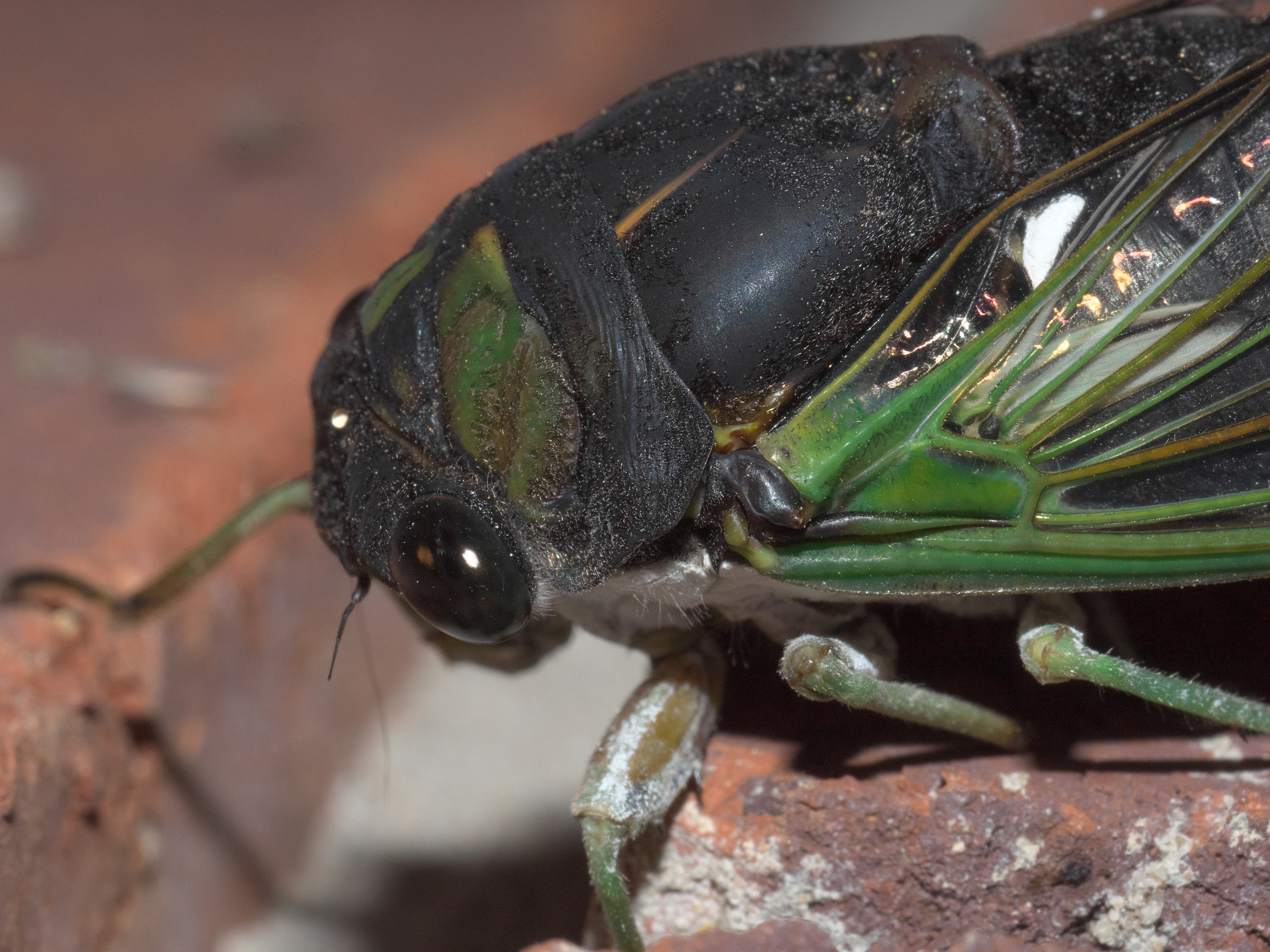
Swamp cicada, Neotibicen tibicen

Neotibicen tibicen, known generally as the swamp cicada or morning cicada, is a species of cicada in the family Cicadidae. It is widespread across much of the eastern and central United States and portions of southeastern Canada. There are two subspecies, N. tibicen tibicen and N. tibicen australis, with the latter replacing subspecies tibicen in portions of Florida, Georgia, and Alabama.

== Description ==
Neotibicen tibicen is active particularly in the morning; hence its common name, morning cicada. It is strictly ectothermic, and only becomes active in the morning after basking in the sun to raise its body temperature. The species' name was Tibicen chloromerus, but in 2008 it was changed to Tibicen tibicen because the cicada was determined to have been described first under this specific epithet. The species was moved to the genus Neotibicen in 2015. N. tibicen is the most frequently encountered Neotibicen because it often perches on low vegetation. Likewise, it is arguably the most common Neotibicen in North America.
