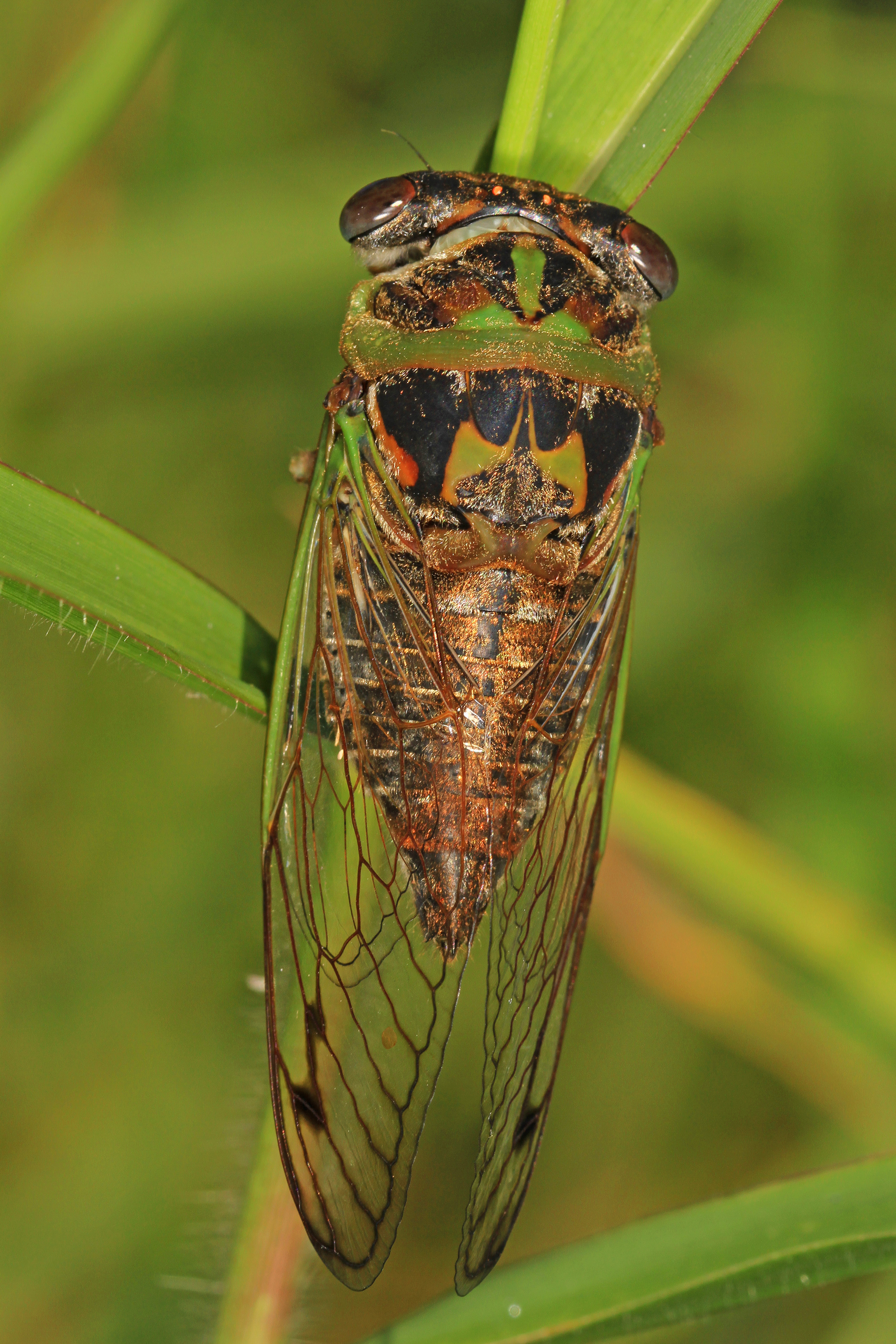

Scientific classification
- Kingdom: Animalia
- Phylum: Arthropoda
- Clade: Pancrustacea
- Class: Insecta
- Order: Hemiptera
- Suborder: Auchenorrhyncha
- Family: Cicadidae
- Genus: Neotibicen
- Species: N. davisi

Binomial name
- Neotibicen davisi (Smith & Grossbeck, 1907)

= Neotibicen davisi =

Species of true bug

Neotibicen davisi, known generally as the Davis' southeastern dog-day cicada or southern dog-day cicada, is a species of cicada in the family Cicadidae. It is named after the North American cicada specialist William Thompson Davis.

== Subspecies ==
These two subspecies belong to the species Neotibicen davisi:

- Neotibicen davisi davisi (Smith, J.B. & Grossbeck, 1907)^{g b} (Davis' southeastern dog-day cicada)
- Neotibicen davisi harnedi (Davis, 1918)^{b}

Data sources: i = ITIS, c = Catalogue of Life, g = GBIF, b = Bugguide.net
