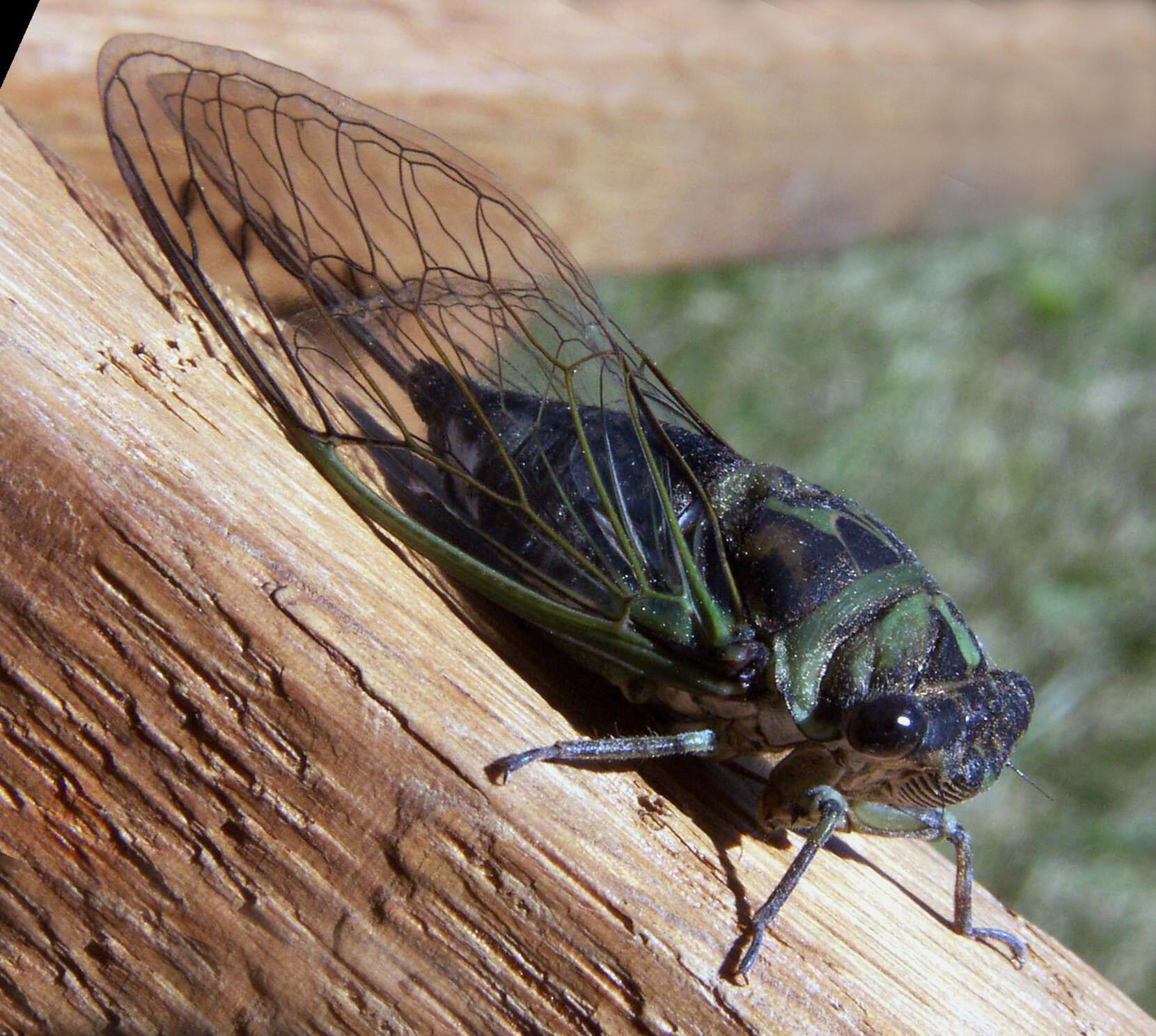

- Bloomington, Minnesota

Scientific classification
- Kingdom: Animalia
- Phylum: Arthropoda
- Clade: Pancrustacea
- Class: Insecta
- Order: Hemiptera
- Suborder: Auchenorrhyncha
- Family: Cicadidae
- Genus: Neotibicen
- Species: N. linnei

Binomial name
- Neotibicen linnei (Smith and Grossbeck, 1907)

Synonyms
- Tibicen linnei Smith and Grossbeck, 1907

= Neotibicen linnei =

Species of true bug

Neotibicen linnei, commonly called Linne's cicada, is a species of large-bodied annual cicada in the genus Neotibicen. It is native to the Eastern United States and Canada. N. linnei in Oklahoma is most easily identified by the costal margin bent at the end of the radial cell and opercula truncated obliquely at the extremities.
