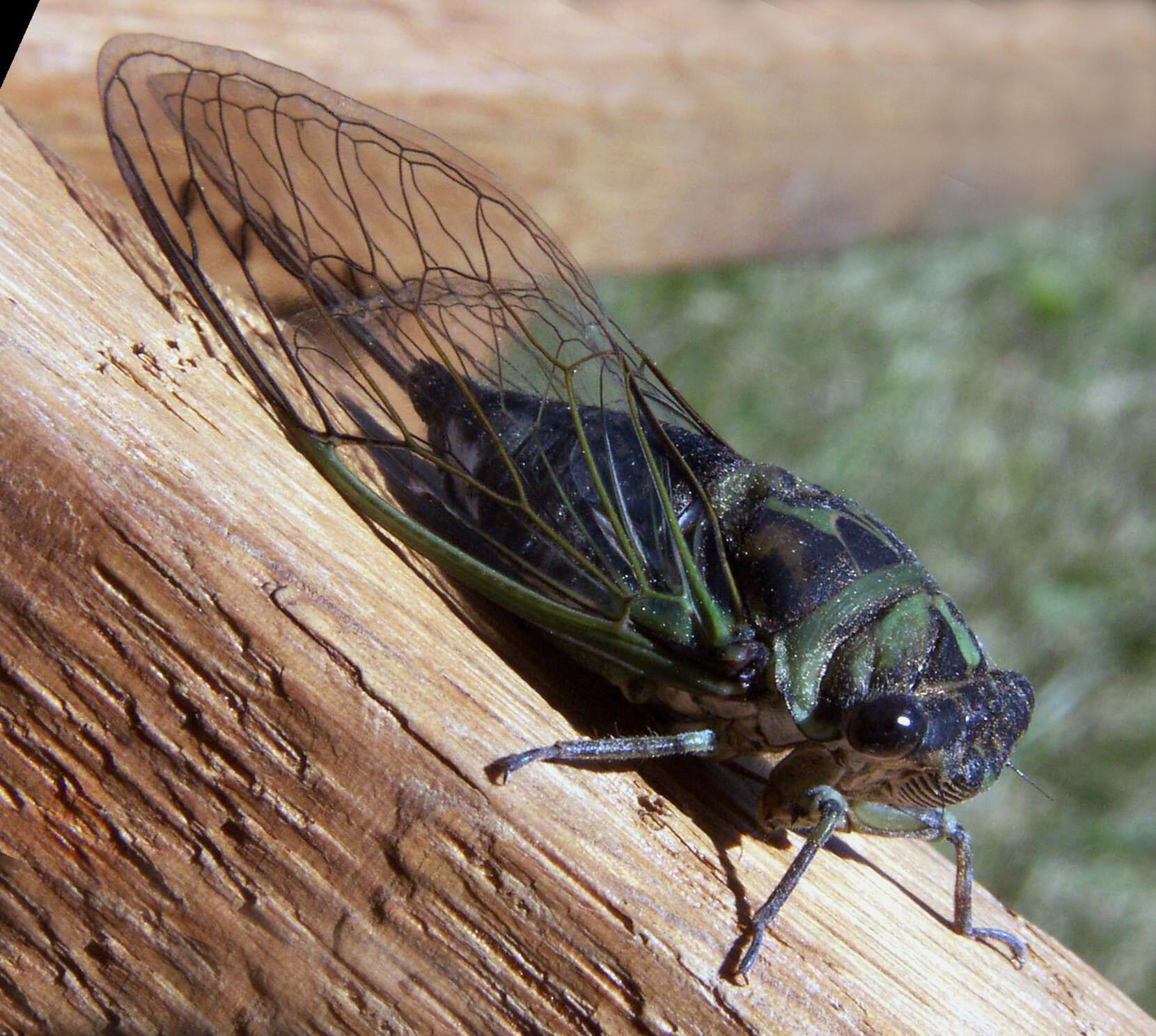
- Linne's cicada (Neotibicen linnei)

Scientific classification
- Kingdom: Animalia
- Phylum: Arthropoda
- Clade: Pancrustacea
- Class: Insecta
- Order: Hemiptera
- Suborder: Auchenorrhyncha
- Family: Cicadidae
- Subtribe: Tacuina
- Genus: Neotibicen; Hill & Moulds, 2015

= Neotibicen =

Genus of true bugs

Cicadas of the genus Neotibicen are large-bodied insects of the family Cicadidae that appear in summer or early fall in eastern North America and formerly Bermuda. Common names include cicada, harvestfly, jar fly, and the misnomer locust.

== Taxonomy ==
In 2015, these species were moved from the genus Tibicen (now genus Lyristes Horvath, 1926), which was redefined in the twenty-first century to include only a few European species, while species from the Western United States and Mexico are now placed in a separate genus, Hadoa. In addition, several former Neotibicen species have been moved to the genus Megatibicen.

=== Species and subspecies ===
- Neotibicen auriferus (Say, 1825) – Field cicada
- Neotibicen canicularis (Harris, 1841) – Dog-day cicada or dog-day harvestfly
- Neotibicen davisi
  - Neotibicen davisi davisi (Smith and Grossbeck, 1907) – Davis's southeastern dog-day cicada
  - Neotibicen davisi harnedi (Davis, 1918)
- Neotibicen latifasciatus (Davis, 1915) – Coastal scissor grinder cicada
- Neotibicen linnei (Smith and Grossbeck, 1907) – Linne's cicada
- Neotibicen lyricen
  - Neotibicen lyricen engelhardti (Davis, 1910)
  - Neotibicen lyricen lyricen (De Geer, 1773) – Lyric cicada
  - Neotibicen lyricen virescens (Davis, 1935)
- Neotibicen pruinosus
  - Neotibicen pruinosus fulvus (Beamer, 1924)
  - Neotibicen pruinosus pruinosus (Say, 1825) – Scissor grinder cicada
- Neotibicen robinsonianus (Davis, 1922) – Robinson's cicada
- Neotibicen similaris
  - Neotibicen similaris apalachicola Marshall and Hill, 2017
  - Neotibicen similaris similaris (Smith and Grossbeck, 1907) – Similar dog-day cicada
- Neotibicen superbus (Fitch, 1855) – Superb southwestern cicada
- Neotibicen tibicen
  - Neotibicen tibicen australis (Davis, 1912)
  - Neotibicen tibicen tibicen (= Tibicen chloromerus) (Linnaeus, 1758) – Swamp cicada
- Neotibicen winnemanna (Davis, 1912) – Eastern scissor grinder cicada
- †Neotibicen bermudianus (Verrill, 1902) – Bermuda cicada (extinct)

== Description ==
Neotibicen cicadas are 1–2 inches (25–51 mm) long, with characteristic green, brown, and black markings on the top of the thorax, and tented, membranous wings extending past the abdomen. The fore wings are about twice the length of the hindwings. Adults feed using their beak to tap into the xylem of plants; nymphs feed from the xylem of roots.

Neotibicen species are the most commonly encountered cicadas in the eastern United States. Unlike periodical cicadas, whose appearances aboveground occur at 13- or 17-year intervals, Neotibicen species can be seen every year, hence their nickname "annual cicadas". Despite their annual appearances, Neotibicen probably take multiple years to develop underground, because all cicada species for which life cycle lengths have been measured do so, except when growing as agricultural pests. Their annual reappearance is presumably due to overlapping generations.

== Communication ==
Like other members of the subfamily Cicadinae, Neotibicen species have loud, complex songs, even (in many cases) with distinct song phrases.

Males produce loud calls in the afternoon or evening (depending on the species) to attract females. These sounds, distinctive for each species, are produced by specialized tymbal organs on the abdomen as in most cicadas. These calls range from a loud buzz to a long rattling sound, sometimes with a pulsating quality.

== Predators ==
Many animals feed on cicadas, which usually occurs during the final days when they become easy prey near the ground. One of the more notable predators is the cicada killer, a large wasp that catches the dog-day cicada. After catching and stinging the insect to paralyze it, the cicada killer carries it back to its hole and drags it underground to a chamber where it lays its eggs in the paralyzed cicada. When the eggs hatch, the wasp larvae feed on the paralyzed, but still living, cicada.

== Gallery ==
Emerging N. tibicen, New Jersey, US

Malformed N. tibicen, New Jersey, US

Photo series of Neotibicen sp. moulting, Ohio, US

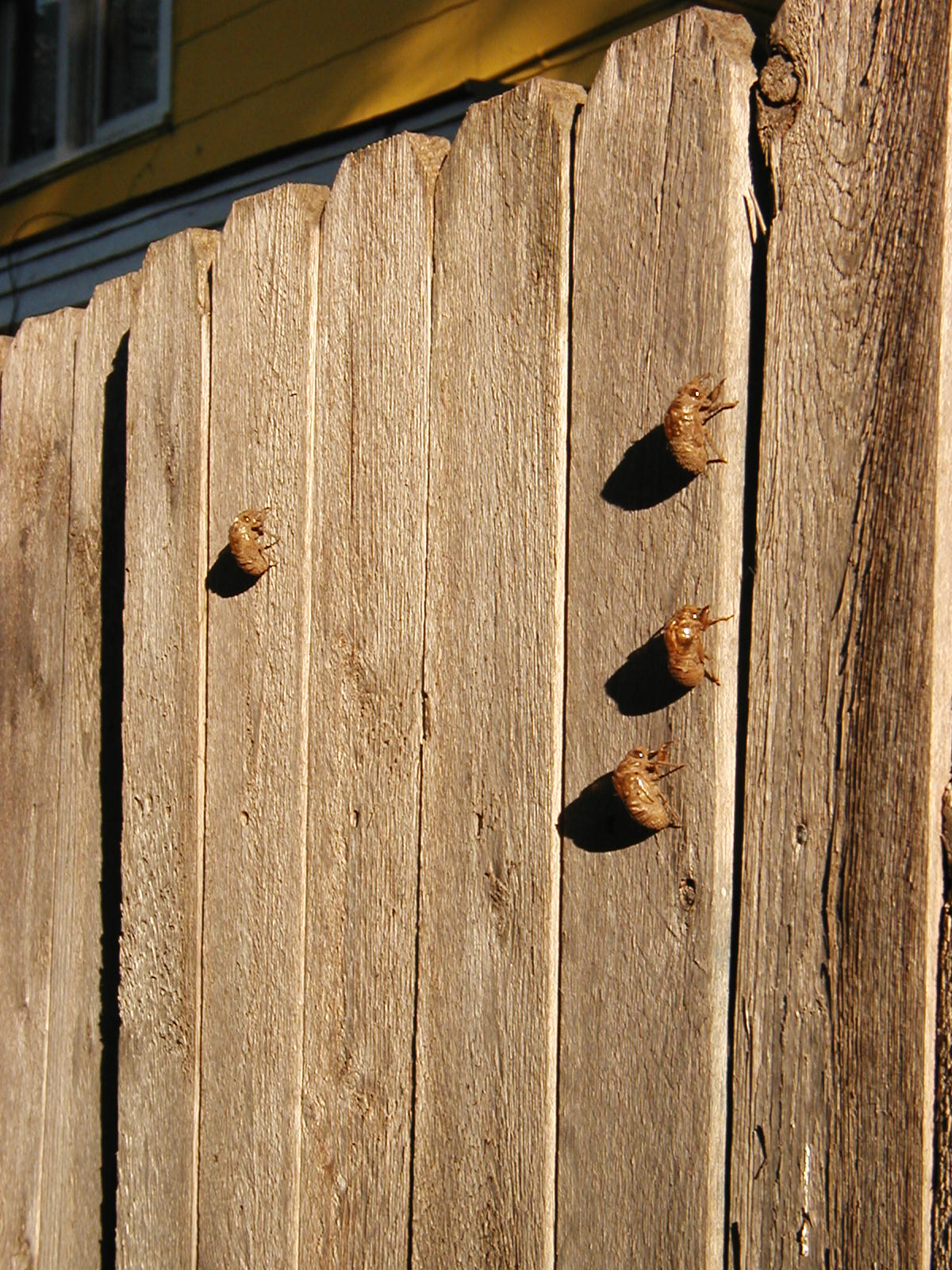
Husks left after moulting

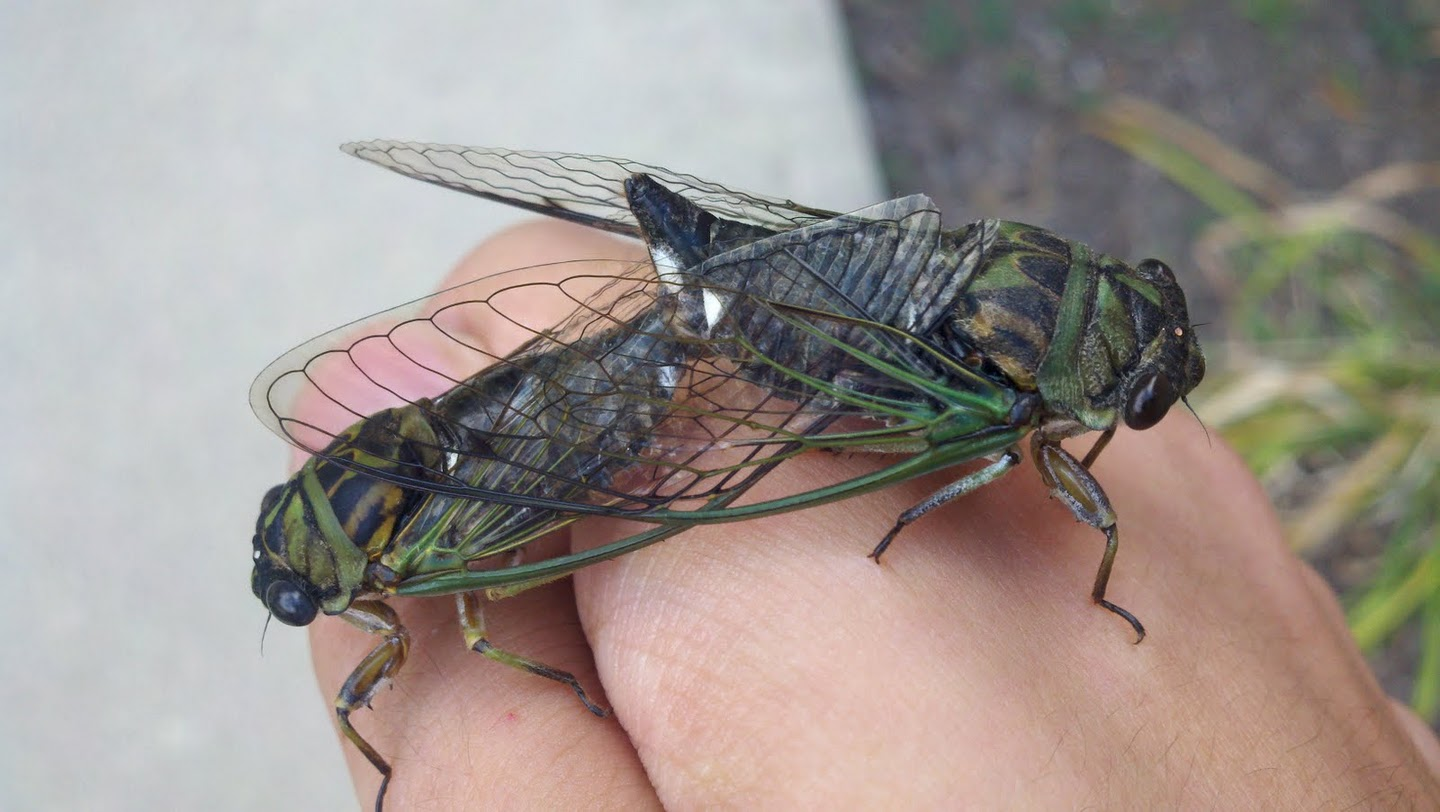
Mating N. canicularis

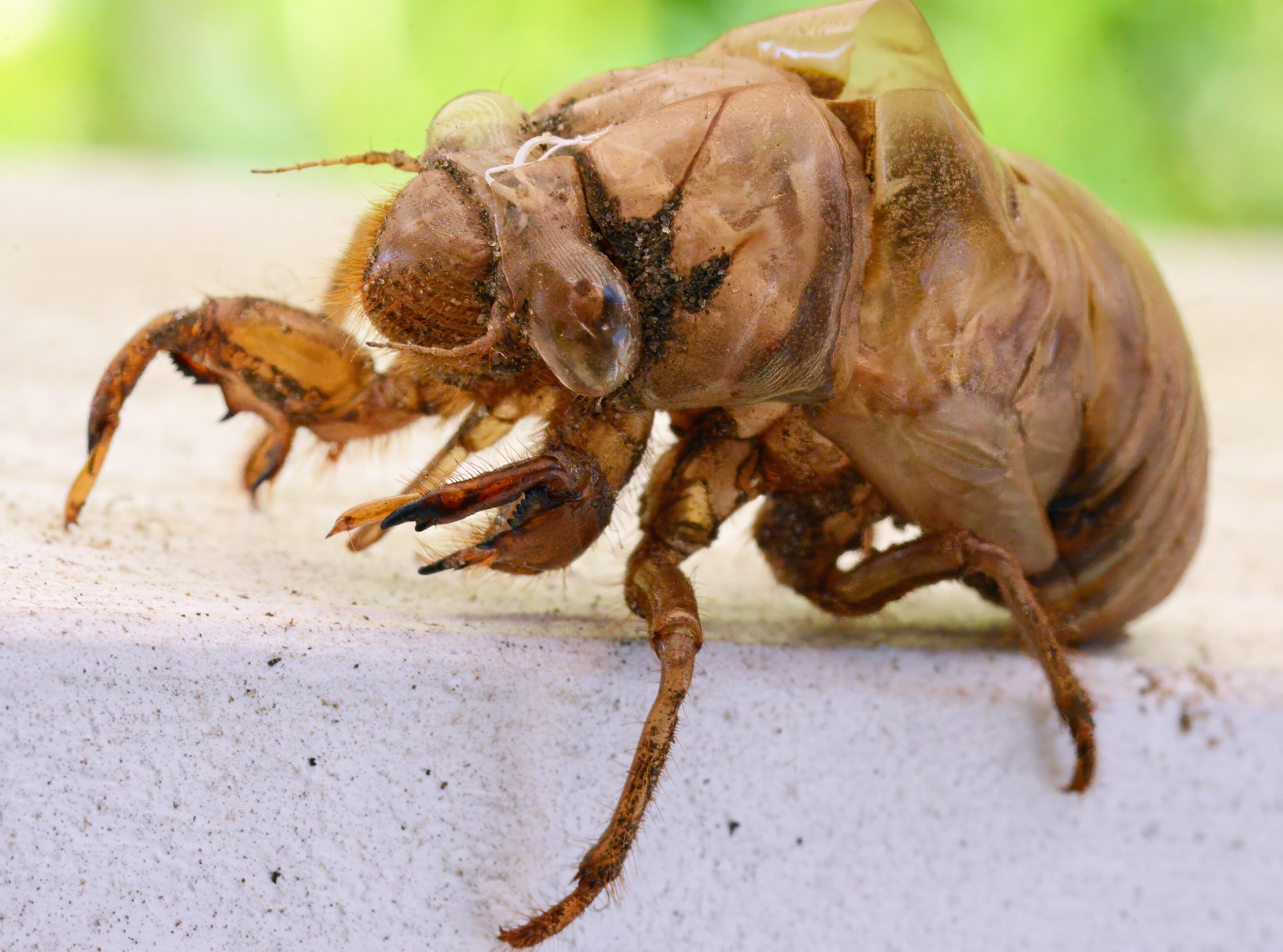
Shell after molting, the head was up

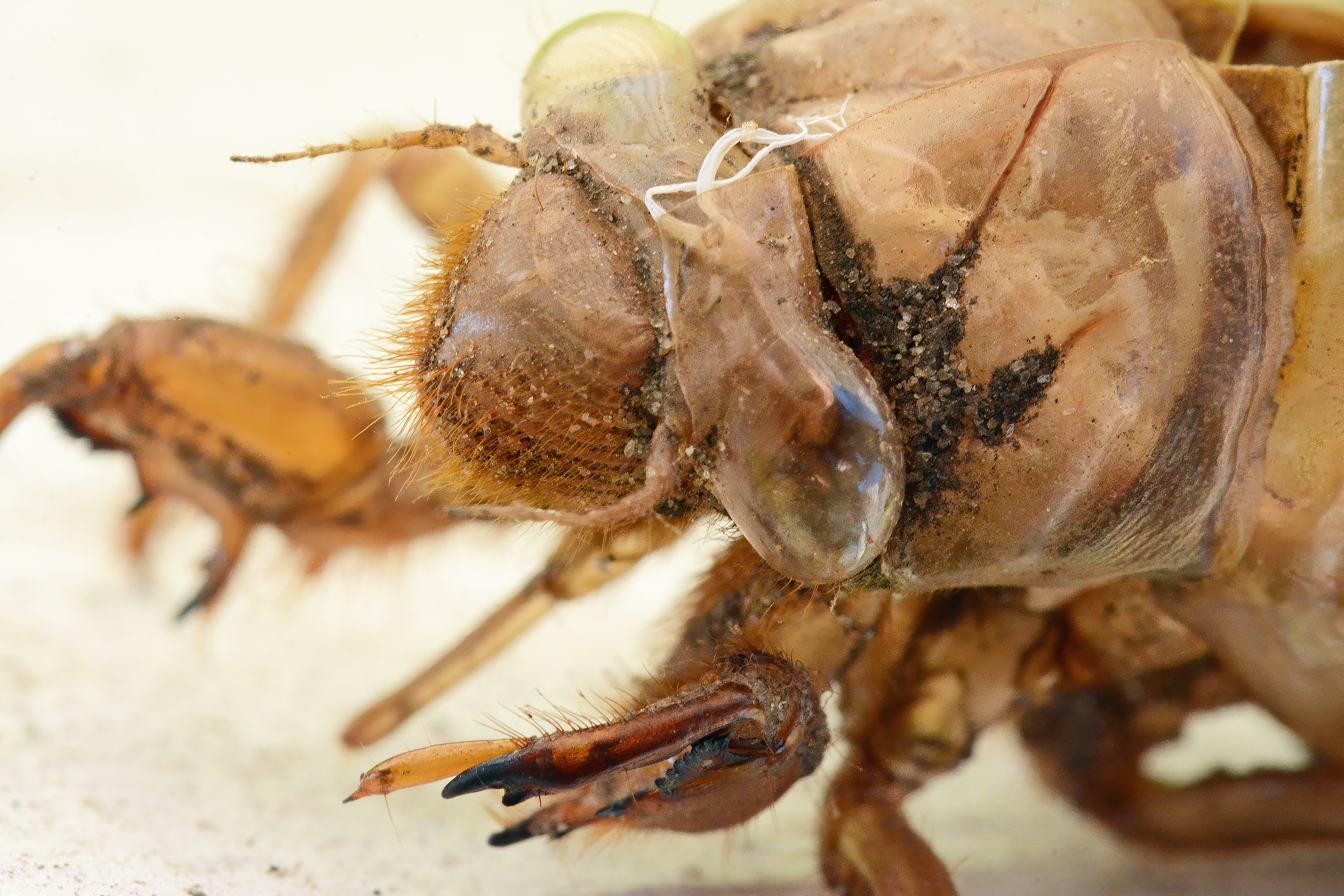
Close-up of the head area

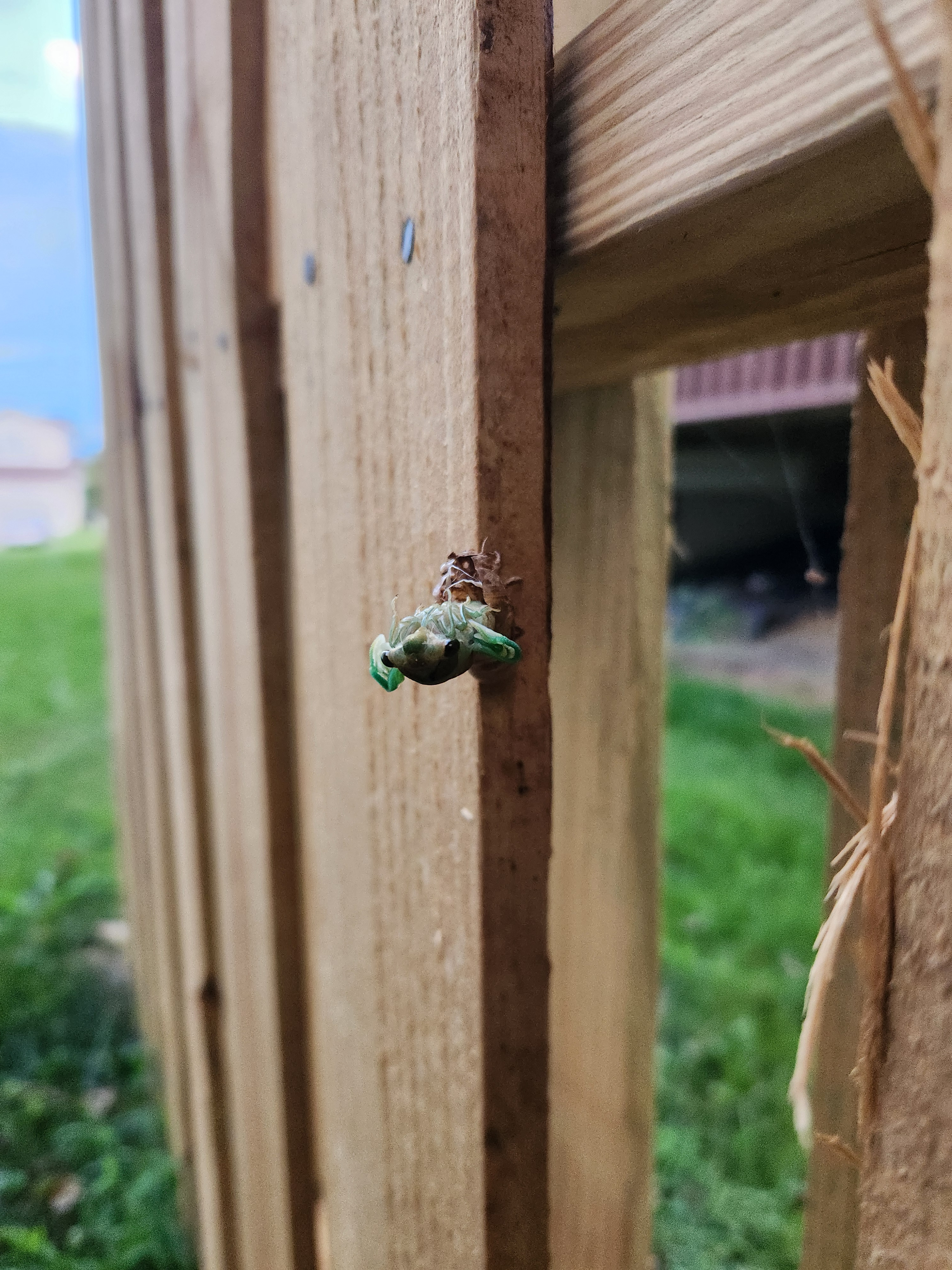
Neotibicen cicada pupating

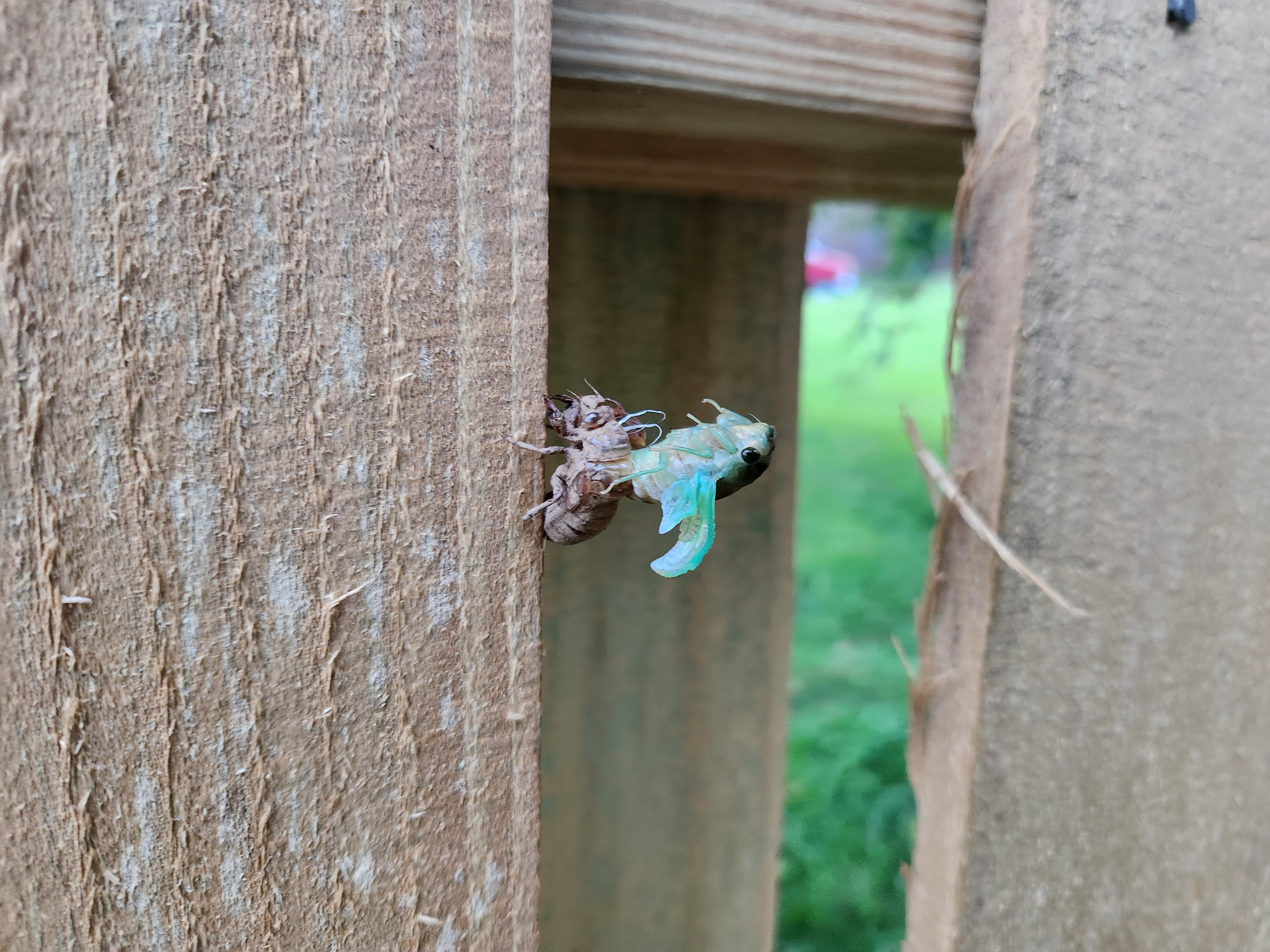
Neotibicen cicada pupating

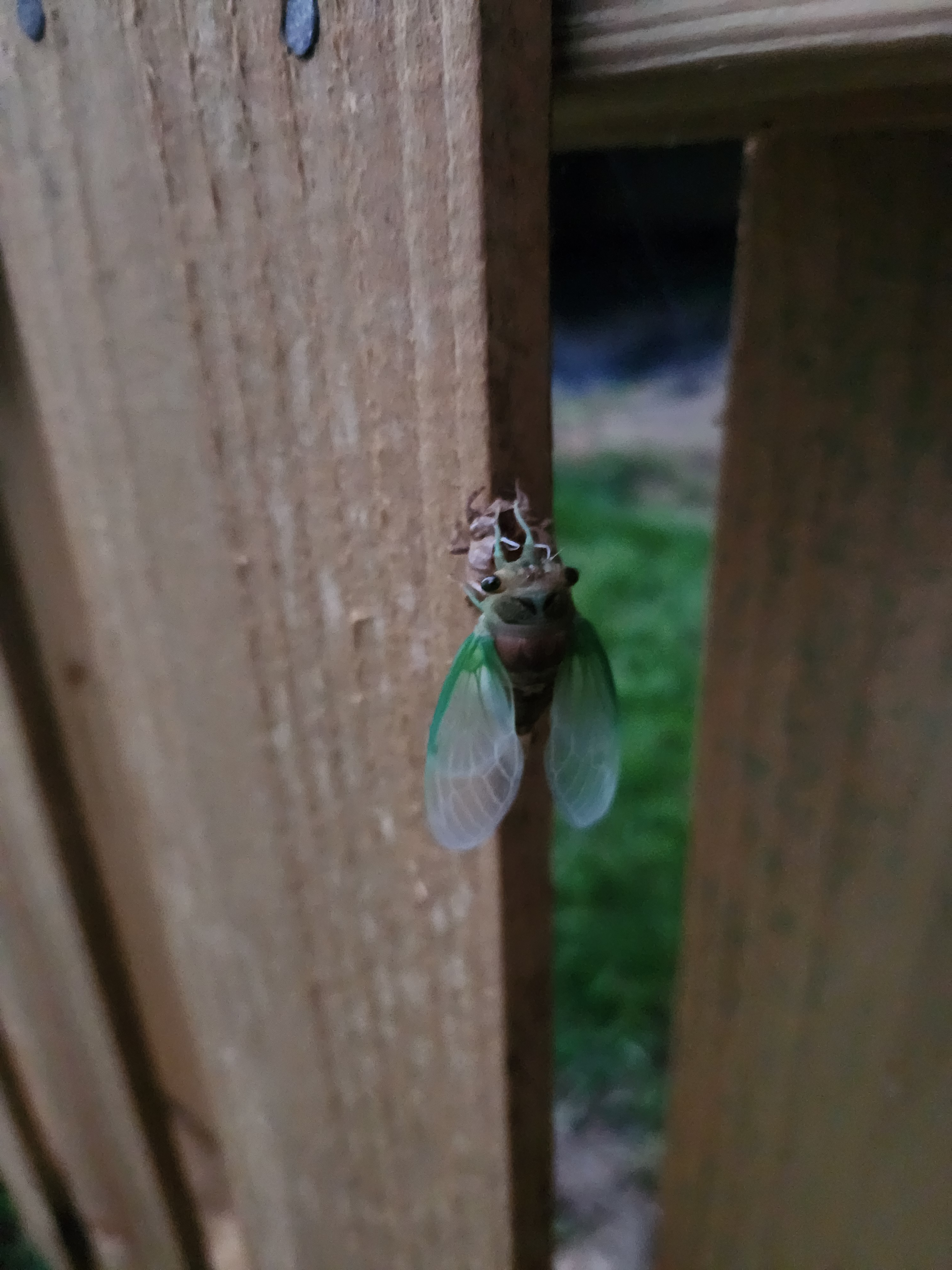
Neotibicen cicada pupating
