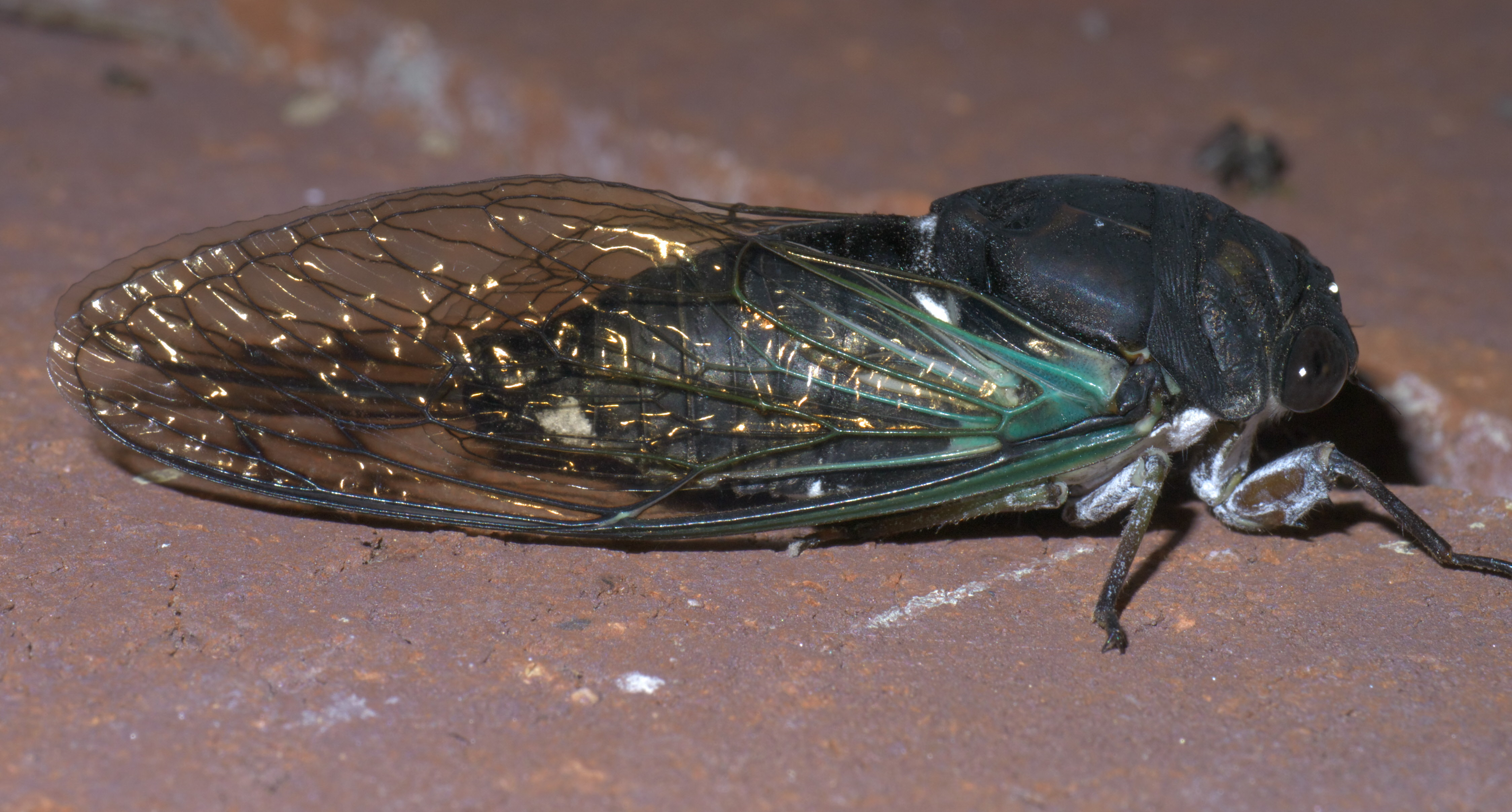
- Neotibicen lyricen lyricen

Scientific classification
- Kingdom: Animalia
- Phylum: Arthropoda
- Clade: Pancrustacea
- Class: Insecta
- Order: Hemiptera
- Suborder: Auchenorrhyncha
- Family: Cicadidae
- Genus: Neotibicen
- Species: N. lyricen

Binomial name
- Neotibicen lyricen (De Geer, 1773)

= Neotibicen lyricen =

Species of true bug

Neotibicen lyricen, the lyric cicada, is a species of cicada in the family Cicadidae.

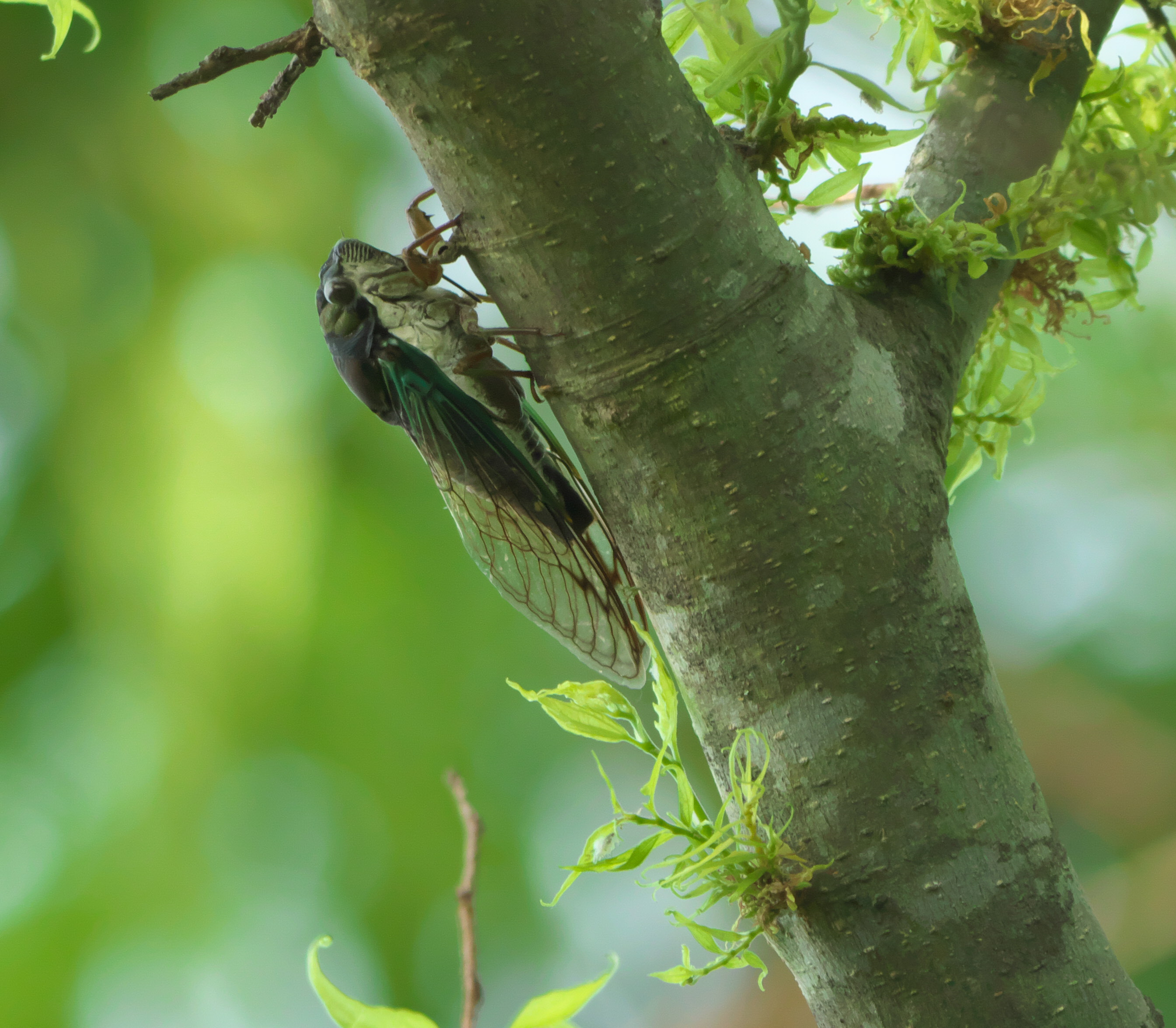
Neotibicen lyricen virescens

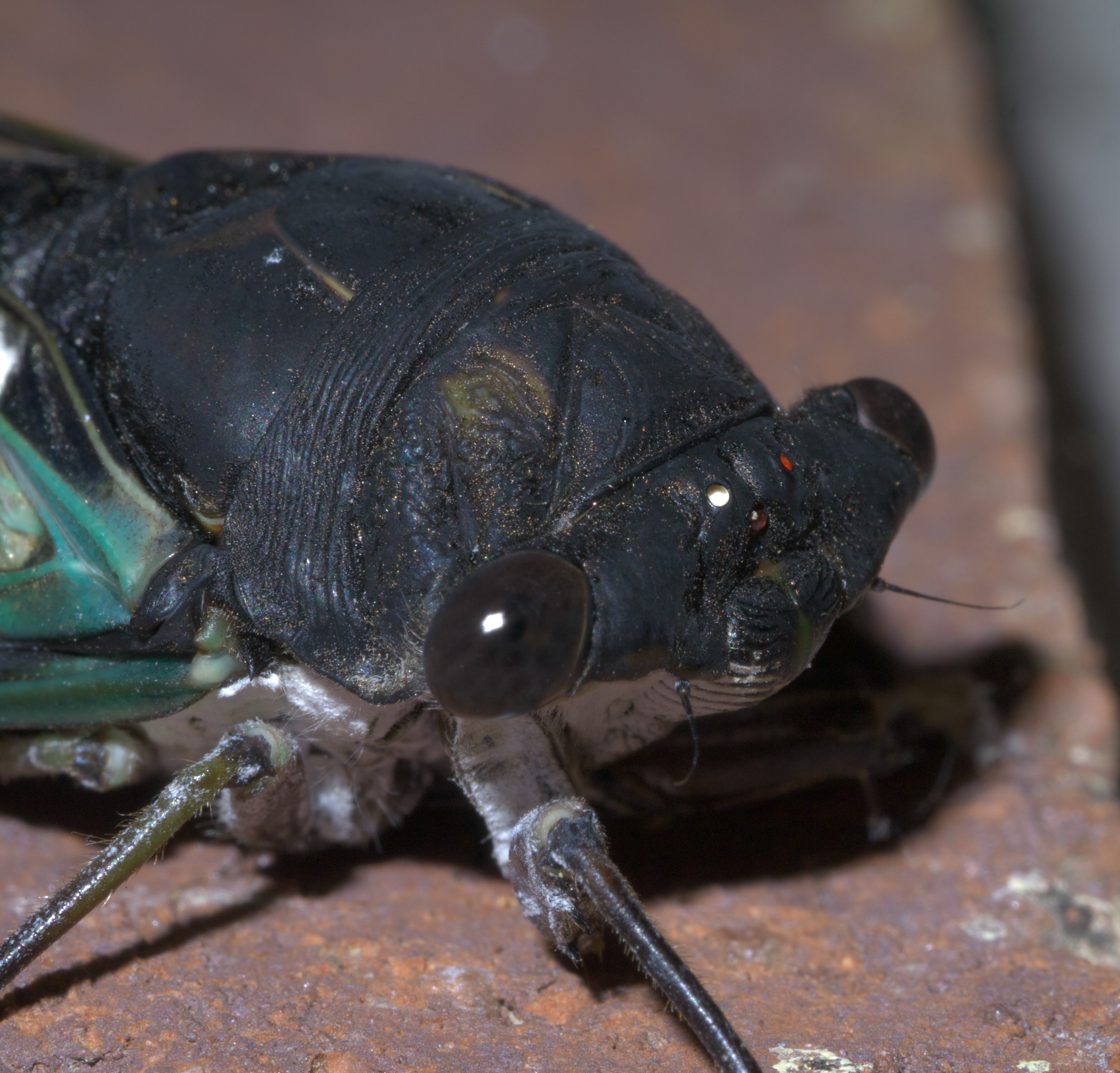
Lyric cicada, Neotibicen lyricen lyricen

== Subspecies ==
These three subspecies belong to the species Neotibicen lyricen:

- Neotibicen lyricen engelhardti (Davis & W.T., 1910)^{g b} (dark lyric cicada)
- Neotibicen lyricen lyricen^{g b} (lyric cicada)
- Neotibicen lyricen virescens (Davis, 1935)^{b} (coastal lyric cicada)

Data sources: i = ITIS, c = Catalogue of Life, g = GBIF, b = Bugguide.net
