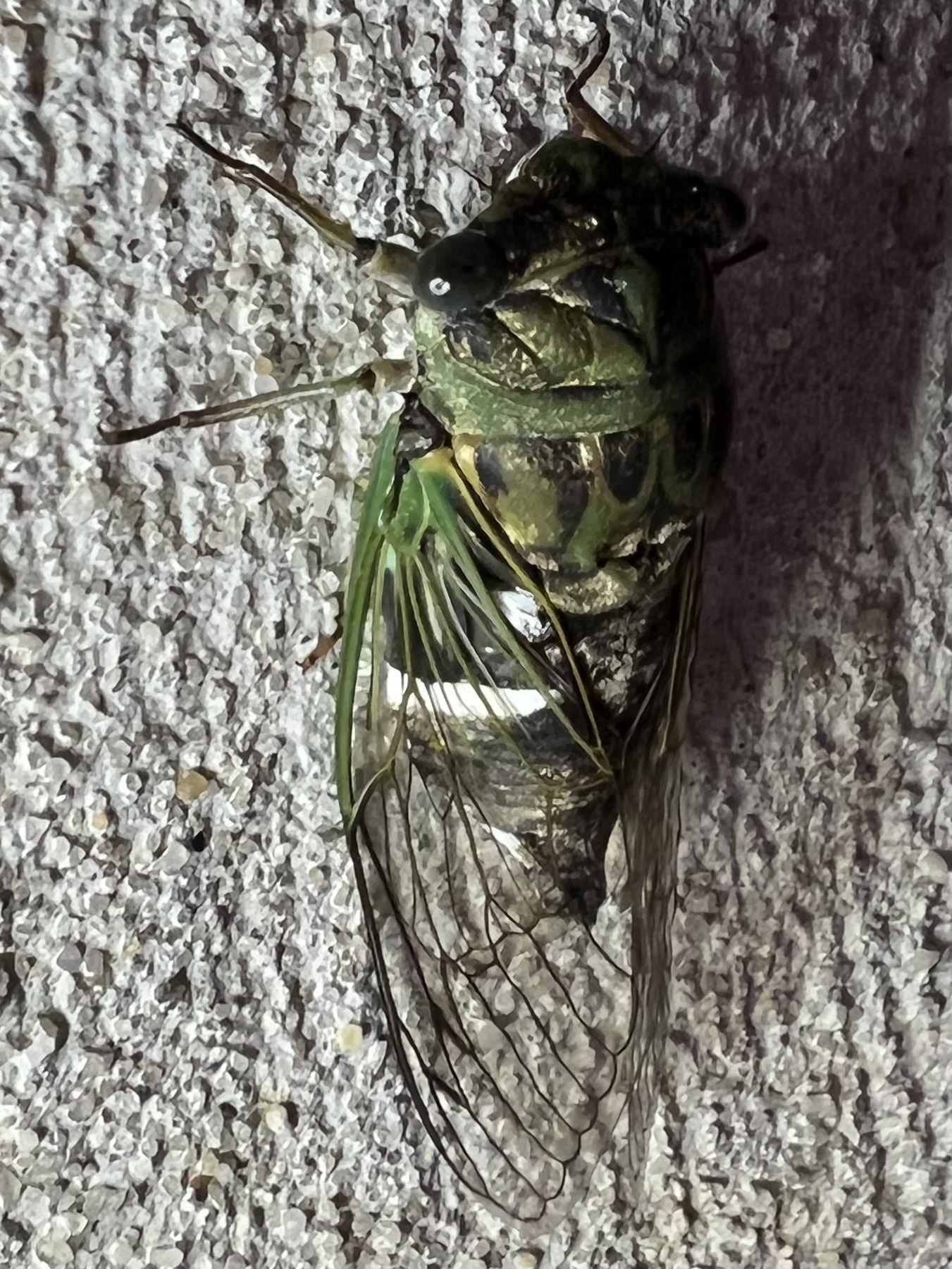

Scientific classification
- Kingdom: Animalia
- Phylum: Arthropoda
- Clade: Pancrustacea
- Class: Insecta
- Order: Hemiptera
- Suborder: Auchenorrhyncha
- Family: Cicadidae
- Genus: Neotibicen
- Species: N. latifasciatus

Binomial name
- Neotibicen latifasciatus (Davis, 1915)

Synonyms
- Tibicen latifasciatus Davis, 1915

= Neotibicen latifasciatus =

Species of true bug

Neotibicen latifasciatus, commonly called the coastal scissor grinder cicada, is a species of annual cicada in the genus Neotibicen.

== See also ==
- Neotibicen pruinosus, the "scissor grinder"
- Neotibicen winnemanna, the "eastern scissor grinder"
