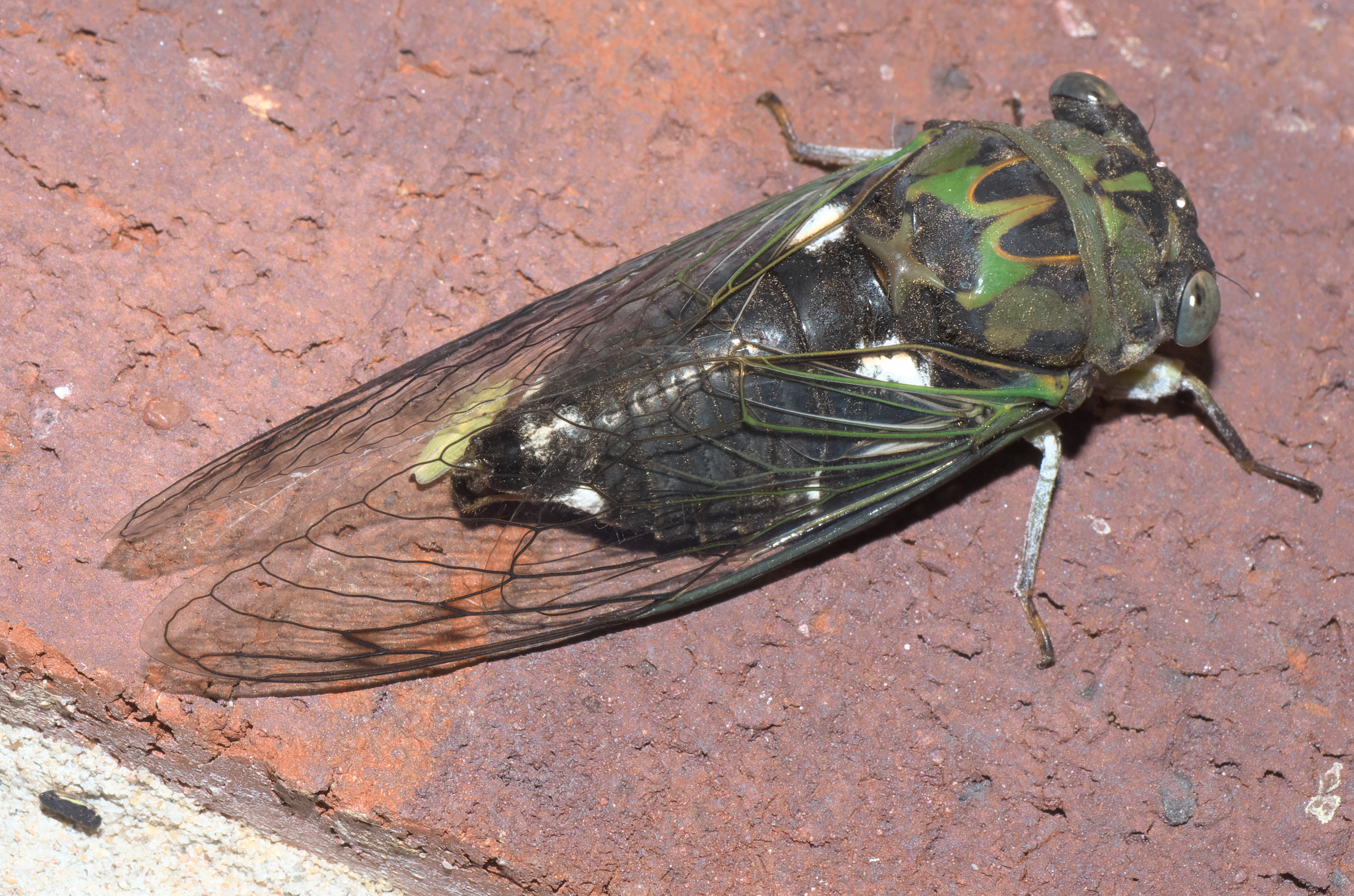

Scientific classification
- Kingdom: Animalia
- Phylum: Arthropoda
- Clade: Pancrustacea
- Class: Insecta
- Order: Hemiptera
- Suborder: Auchenorrhyncha
- Family: Cicadidae
- Genus: Neotibicen
- Species: N. pruinosus

Binomial name
- Neotibicen pruinosus (Say, 1825)

= Neotibicen pruinosus =

Species of true bug

Neotibicen pruinosus, commonly known as the scissor grinder, is a species of cicada in the family Cicadidae.

== Distribution and habitat ==
The scissor grinder occurs in most of the eastern United States. It is common in wooded areas, often within grassland environments.

== Taxonomy ==
All species in the genus Neotibicen used to be part of the genus Tibicen, until Tibicen was split into multiple genera. Neo is Greek for "new" while tibicen is Latin for "flute player" or "piper".

The specific name pruinosus is Latin for "frosty". Its common name, the scissor grinder, comes from its sound, like all the other cicadas that are known as scissor grinders. They all sound like scissors being run over a grinding wheel.

== Diet ==
Scissor grinders, like all other cicadas, use their proboscis, a type of insect mouthpart similar to a straw, to pierce trees and drink fluid from the xylem.

== Description ==
The scissor grinder is similar in appearance to many other species in its genus. It is mostly green with many complex markings on its body. Its abdomen is entirely black.

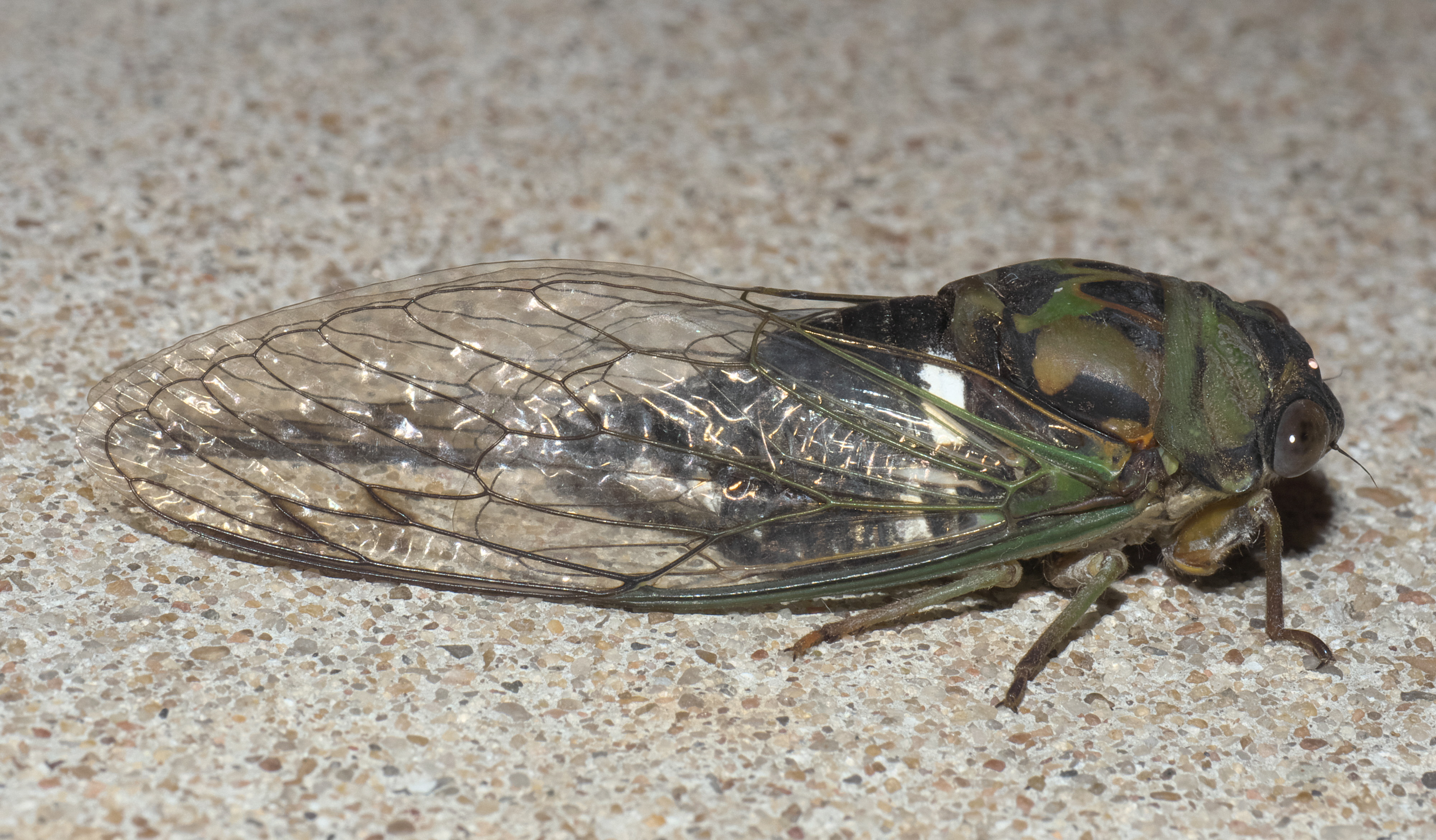

A rare pale variant of the scissor grinder occurs in southeastern Kansas and eastern Oklahoma. This variant is far lighter in coloring than its common variant.

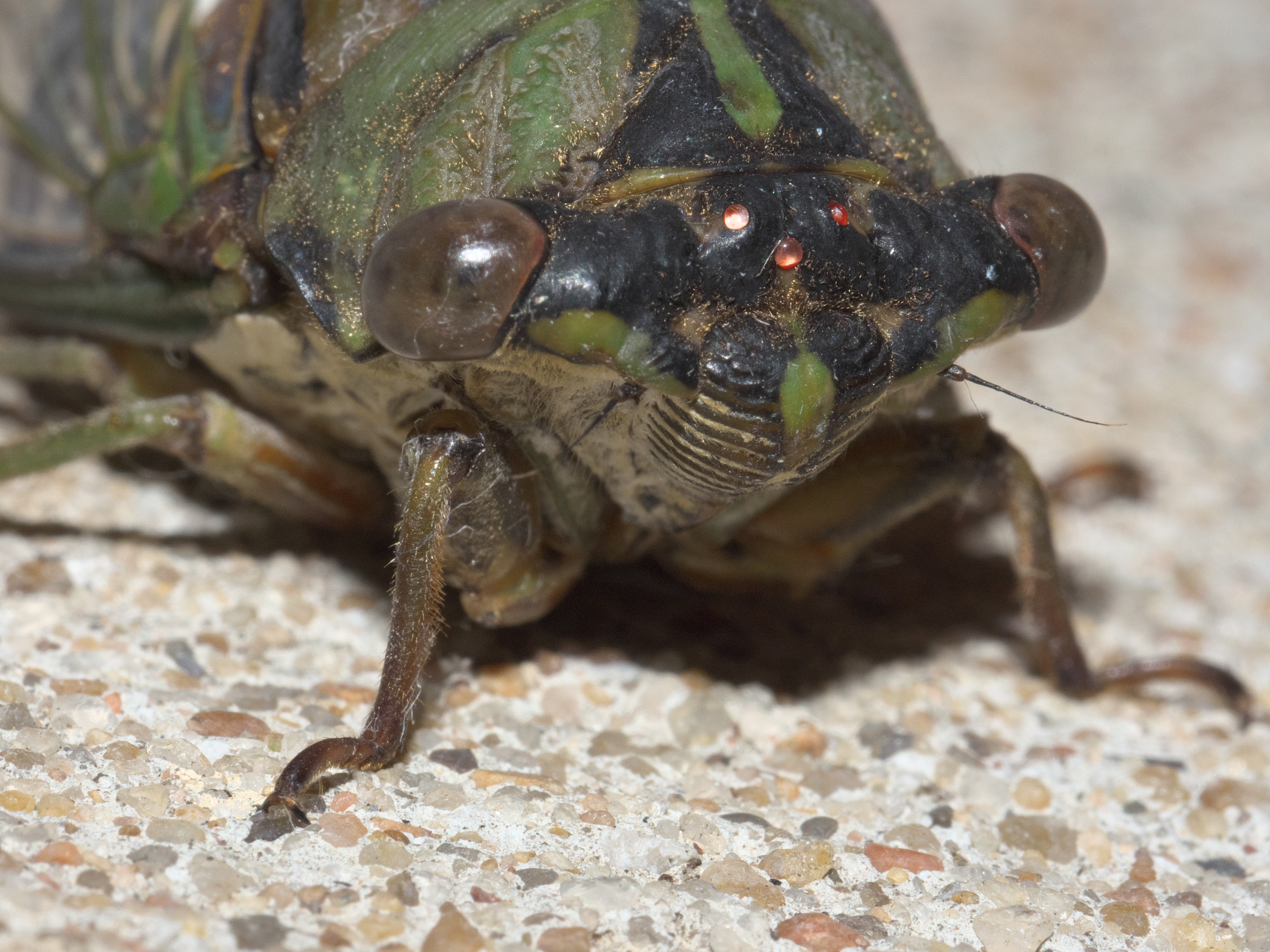

== Subspecies ==
These two subspecies belong to the species Neotibicen pruinosus:

- Neotibicen pruinosus fulvus (Beamer, 1924)^{c g}
- Neotibicen pruinosus pruinosus^{g}

Data sources: i = ITIS, c = Catalogue of Life, g = GBIF, b = Bugguide.net

== See also ==
- Neotibicen winnemanna, the eastern scissor grinder
- Neotibicen latifasciatus, the coastal scissor grinder
