= Annual cicada =

Common name for certain true bugs

Annual cicadas are Cicadidae species that appear every summer. The life cycle of an annual cicada typically spans 2 to 5 years; they are "annual" only in the sense that members of the species reappear once a year. The name is used to distinguish them from periodical cicada species, which occur only in Eastern North America, are developmentally synchronized, and appear in great swarms every 13 or 17 years. All other cicadas from other biogeographic regions produce annual broods, so the distinction is not made outside of North America.

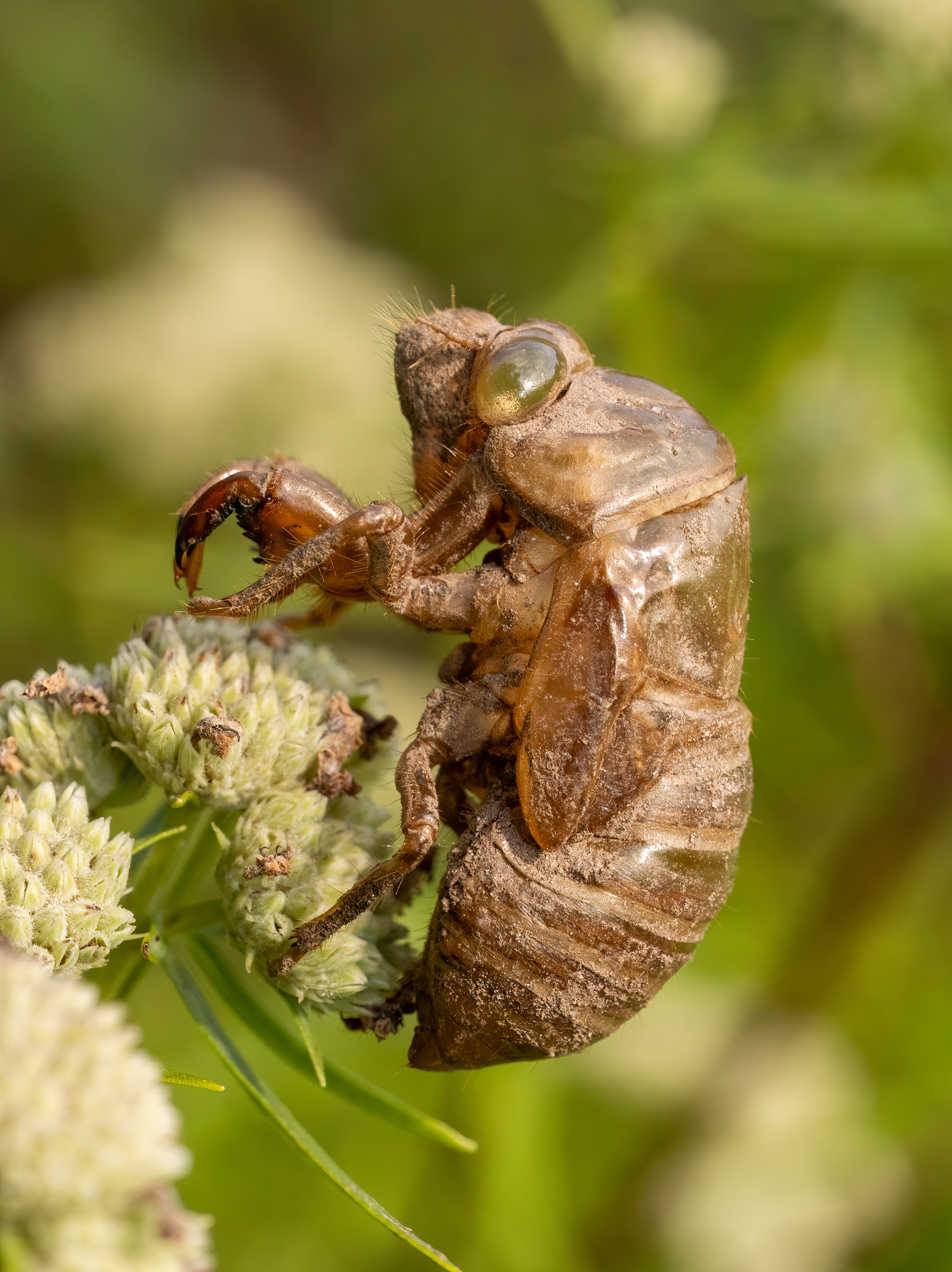
Exuvia of a northern dog-day annual cicada

Species called "annual cicada" include members of the genus Neotibicen ("dog-day cicadas"), Diceroprocta, Neocicada, and Okanagana. (See Cicada for additional information.)

Annual Cicada adult male singing (with audio)
