= Parnisini =

Scientific classification
- Kingdom: Animalia
- Phylum: Arthropoda
- Clade: Pancrustacea
- Class: Insecta
- Order: Hemiptera
- Suborder: Auchenorrhyncha
- Family: Cicadidae
- Subfamily: Cicadettinae
- Tribe: Parnisini; Distant, 1905

Tribe of true bugs

Parnisini is a tribe of cicadas in the family Cicadidae. There are more than 20 genera and 80 described species in Parnisini, found in the Neotropics, Palearctic, tropical Africa and Madagascar.

== Genera ==
The following genera belong to the tribe Parnisini:

- Abagazara Distant, 1905
- Acyroneura Torres, 1958
- Adeniana Distant, 1905
- Arcystasia Distant, 1882
- Bijaurana Distant, 1912
- Calopsaltria Stål, 1861
- Calyria Stål, 1862
- Crassisternalna Boulard, 1980
- Derotettix Berg, 1882
- Henicotettix Stål, 1858
- Jafuna Distant, 1912
- Kageralna Boulard, 2012
- Koranna Distant, 1905
- Luangwana Distant, 1914
- Lycurgus China, 1925
- Malgotilia Boulard, 1980
- Mapondera Distant, 1905
- Masupha Distant, 1892
- Parnisa Stål, 1862
- Prunasis Stål, 1862
- Psilotympana Stål, 1861
- Rhinopsalta Melichar, 1908
- Taipinga Distant, 1905
- Zouga Distant, 1906
