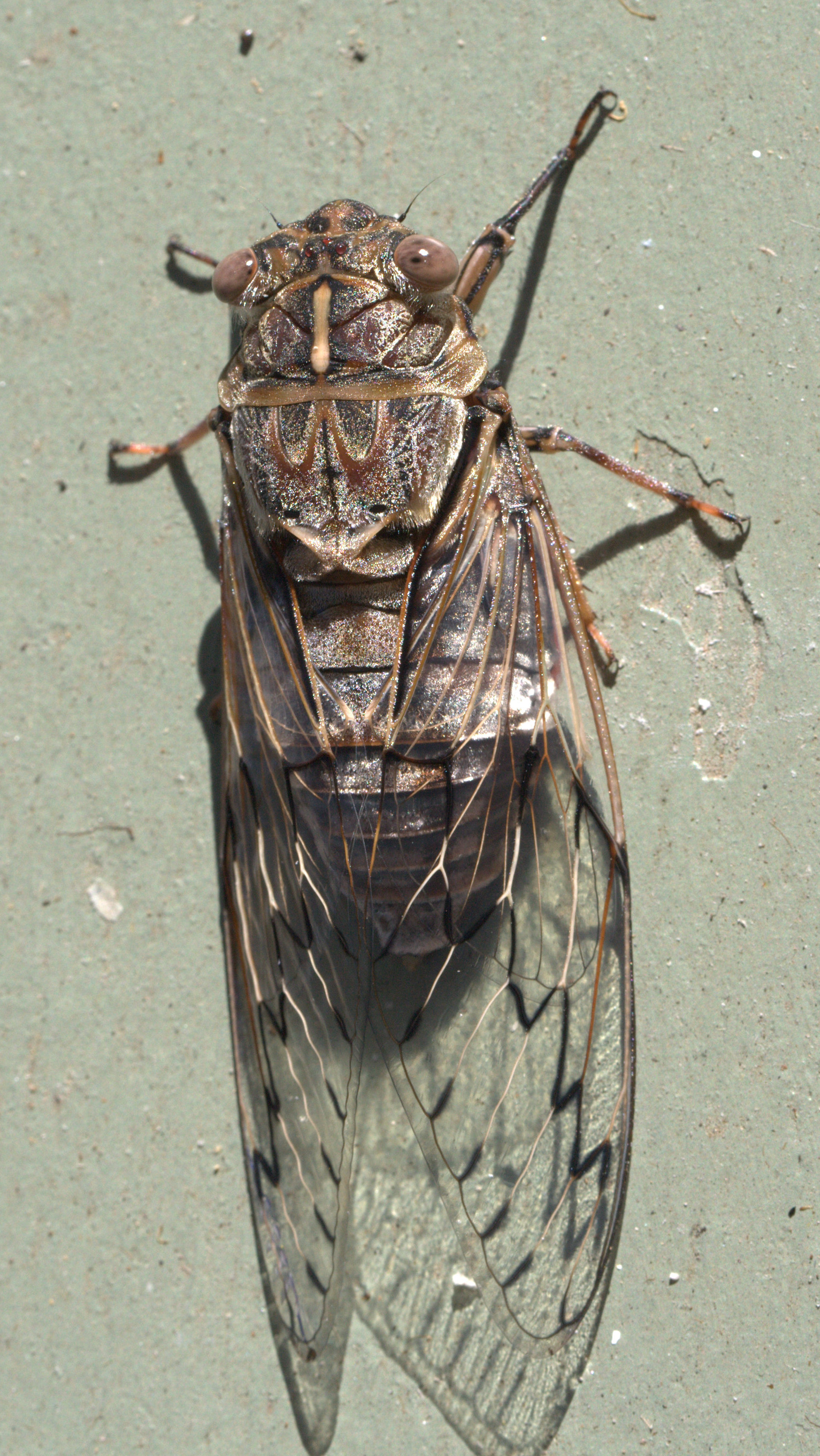
- Henicopsaltria eydouxii

Scientific classification
- Kingdom: Animalia
- Phylum: Arthropoda
- Clade: Pancrustacea
- Class: Insecta
- Order: Hemiptera
- Suborder: Auchenorrhyncha
- Family: Cicadidae
- Subfamily: Cicadinae
- Tribe: Arenopsaltriini
- Genus: Henicopsaltria; Stål, 1866

Species
- See text

= Henicopsaltria =

Genus of true bugs

Henicopsaltria is a genus of cicada, also known as grinders, in the Arenopsaltriini tribe of the Cicadinae subfamily. Four species have been described. The razor grinder (Henicopsaltria eydouxii) is the type species.

== Species ==
Species accepted as of January 2025:

- Henicopsaltria danielsi Moulds, 1993 (McIvor River Grinder)
- Henicopsaltria eydouxii (Guérin-Méneville, 1838) (Razor Grinder)
- Henicopsaltria kelsalli Distant, 1910 (Cape York Grinder)
- Henicopsaltria rufivelum Moulds, 1978 (Jungle Grinder)
