= Zamparini =

Zamparini is an Italian surname. Notable people with the surname include:

- Maurizio Zamparini (1941–2022), Italian businessman
- Primo Zamparini (1939–2024), Italian boxer

== See also ==
- Zammarini
- Zamperini
