= Moana (cicada) =

Scientific classification
- Kingdom: Animalia
- Phylum: Arthropoda
- Clade: Pancrustacea
- Class: Insecta
- Order: Hemiptera
- Suborder: Auchenorrhyncha
- Family: Cicadidae
- Subfamily: Cicadinae
- Tribe: Cosmopsaltriini
- Genus: Moana; Myers, 1928

Genus of true bugs

Moana is a genus of cicadas in the family Cicadidae. There are at least four described species in Moana.

== Species ==
These four species belong to the genus Moana:

- Moana aluana (Distant, 1905)^{c g}
- Moana expansa Myers, 1928^{c g}
- Moana novaeirelandicae (Duffels, 1977)^{c g}
- Moana obliqua (Duffels, 1977)^{c g}

Data sources: i = ITIS, c = Catalogue of Life, g = GBIF, b = Bugguide.net
