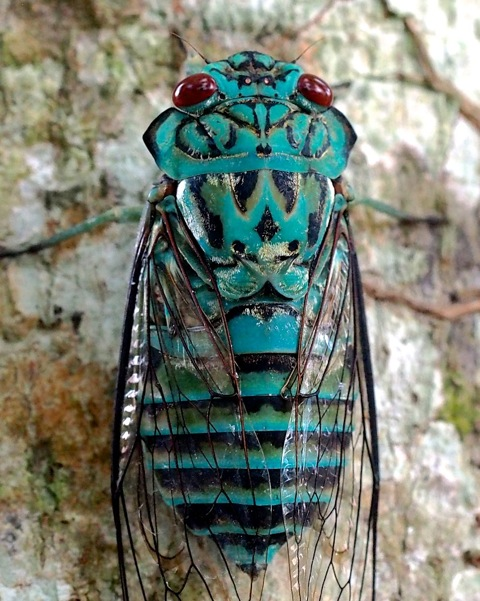
- Zammara smaragdula

Scientific classification
- Domain: Eukaryota
- Kingdom: Animalia
- Phylum: Arthropoda
- Class: Insecta
- Order: Hemiptera
- Suborder: Auchenorrhyncha
- Family: Cicadidae
- Subfamily: Cicadinae
- Tribe: Zammarini
- Subtribe: Zammarina
- Genus: Zammara; Amyot and Serville, 1843

Species
- see text

= Zammara =

Genus of true bugs

Zammara (from Hebrew: זַמָּר, romanized: zamár, lit. 'singer') is a genus of cicadas. These species are large cicadas that are generally bright blue-green in color. Like other cicadas, these can produce loud calls; Zammara tympanum, for example, makes a "winding up-like pulsating buzz." Zammara are found in the Neotropics, especially in equatorial regions, where they live in tropical forest habitat. The genus is characterized by tarsi (the "feet" of the insect) that are divided into 2 segments, or tarsomeres; other genera in the tribe have 3 tarsomeres in each tarsus.

There are about 15 or 16 species in the genus.

Species include:

- Zammara brevis
- Zammara calochroma
- Zammara erna
- Zammara eximia
- Zammara hertha
- Zammara intricata
- Zammara lichyi
- Zammara luculenta
- Zammara medialinea
- Zammara nigriplaga
- Zammara olivacea
- Zammara smaragdina
- Zammara smaragdula
- Zammara strepens
- Zammara tympanum
