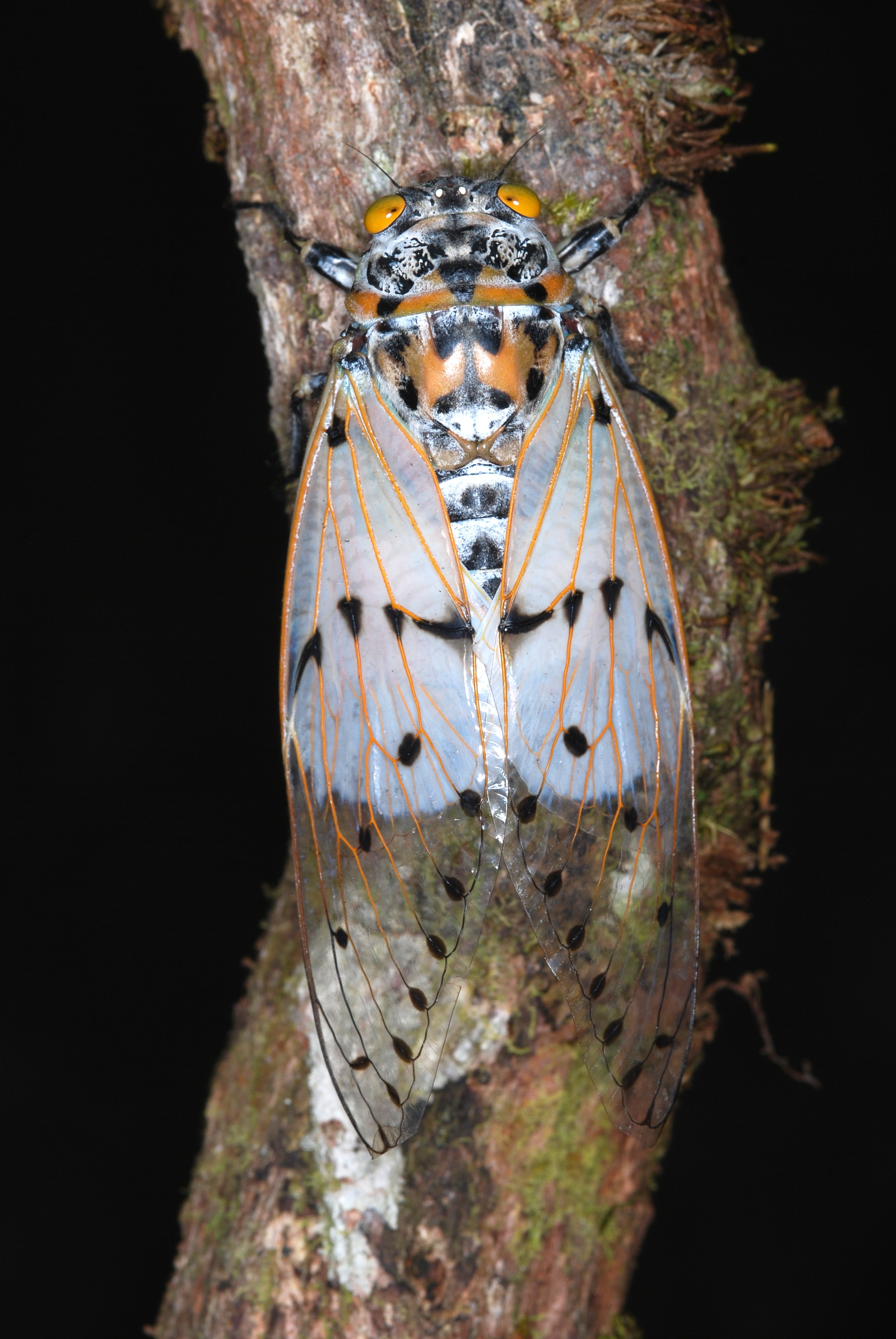
- Ayuthia spectabile in Perak, Malaysia

Scientific classification
- Kingdom: Animalia
- Phylum: Arthropoda
- Clade: Pancrustacea
- Class: Insecta
- Order: Hemiptera
- Suborder: Auchenorrhyncha
- Family: Cicadidae
- Subfamily: Cicadinae
- Tribe: Ayuthiini
- Genus: Ayuthia
- Species: A. spectabile

Binomial name
- Ayuthia spectabile Distant, 1919

Synonyms
- Aguthia Moulton, 1923

= Ayuthia spectabile =

Species of true bugs

Ayuthia spectabile, the only species in the monotypic genus Ayuthia, is commonly known as the milky cicada or white ghost cicada, belongs to the subfamily Cicadinae; the genus was previously in the tribe Tosenini, but recent studies have placed it in the tribe Ayuthiini Moulds, Lee, and Marshall, 2021, together with another monotypic genus Distantalna.

== Distribution ==
The species has been reported from Vietnam, Thailand and peninsular Malaysia in Southeast Asia. It was described by William Lucas Distant in 1919.

== Description ==
The head, including the eyes, is narrower than the base of the mesonotum and almost as long as the pronotum. The forehead is obliquely depressed. The distance between the ocelli and the eyes is greater than the space between them, which has a broad and strong longitudinal groove.

The pronotum is clearly shorter than the mesonotum, moderately convex in laterality with a coarsely serrated margin. The posterior margin is moderately wide and has truncated lateral angles. The operculum in the male is short and wide, extending beyond the base of the metasternum. The anterior femora are strongly spiny below. The rostrum reaches the base of the metasternum. Both pairs of wings are semi-opaque, with the forewings containing eight apical cells.

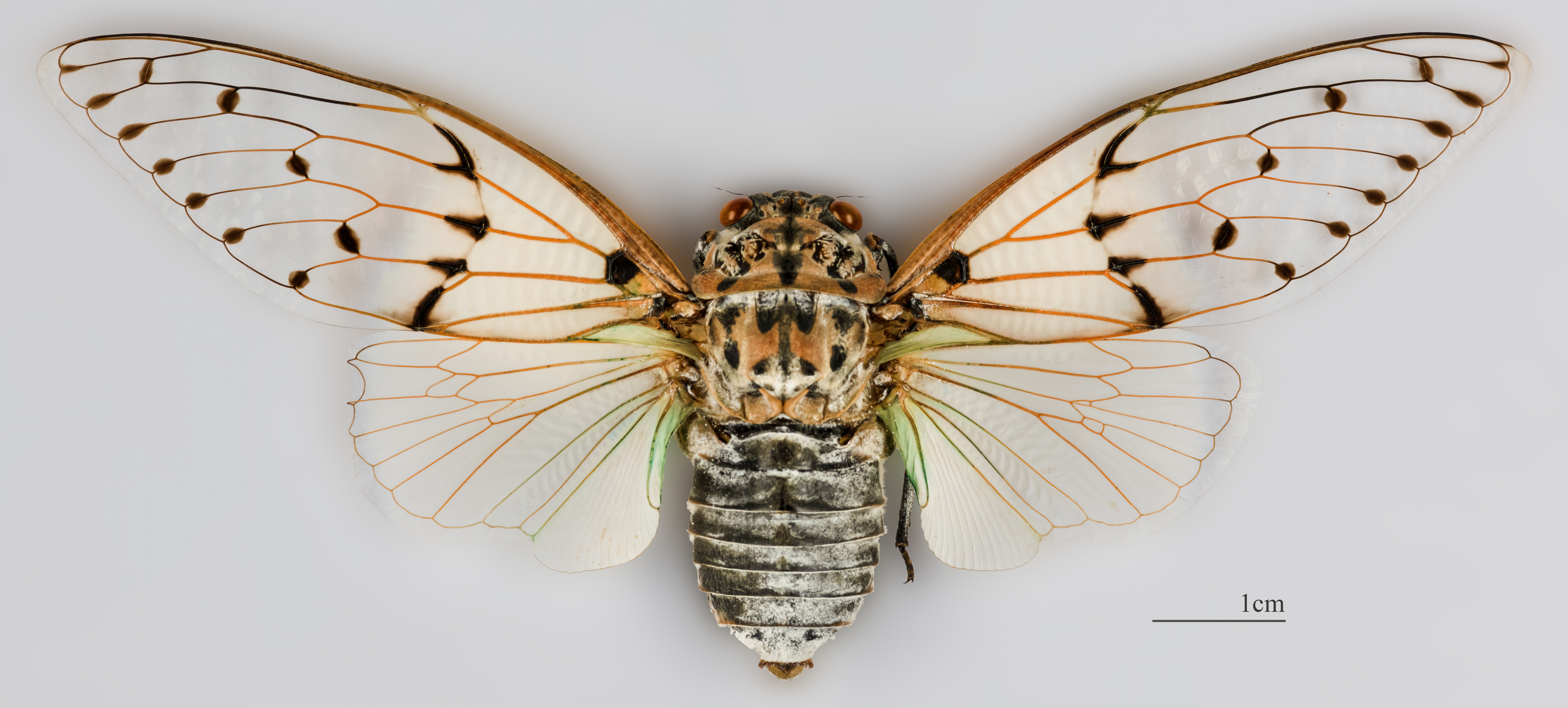
♂ MHNT

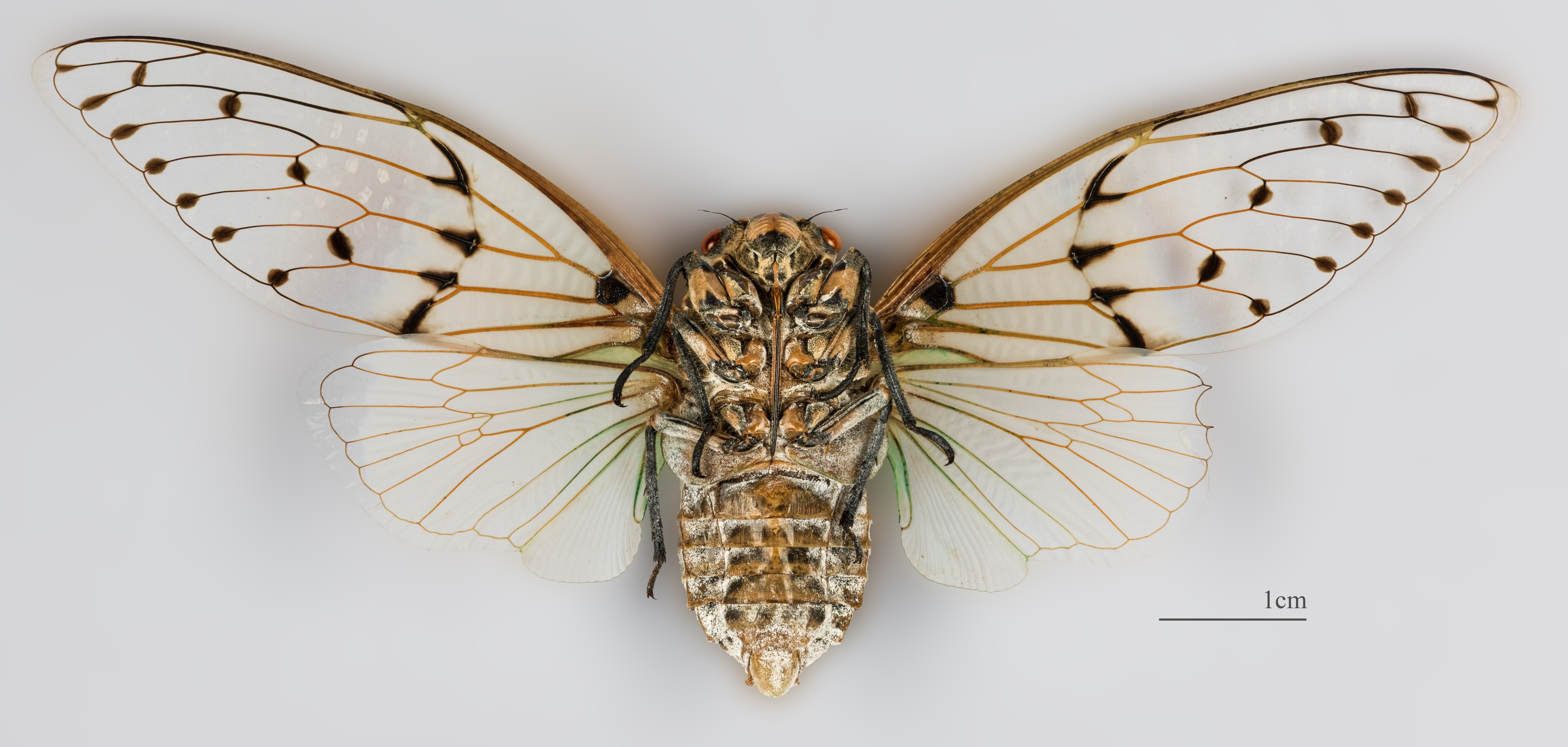
♂ △ MHNT
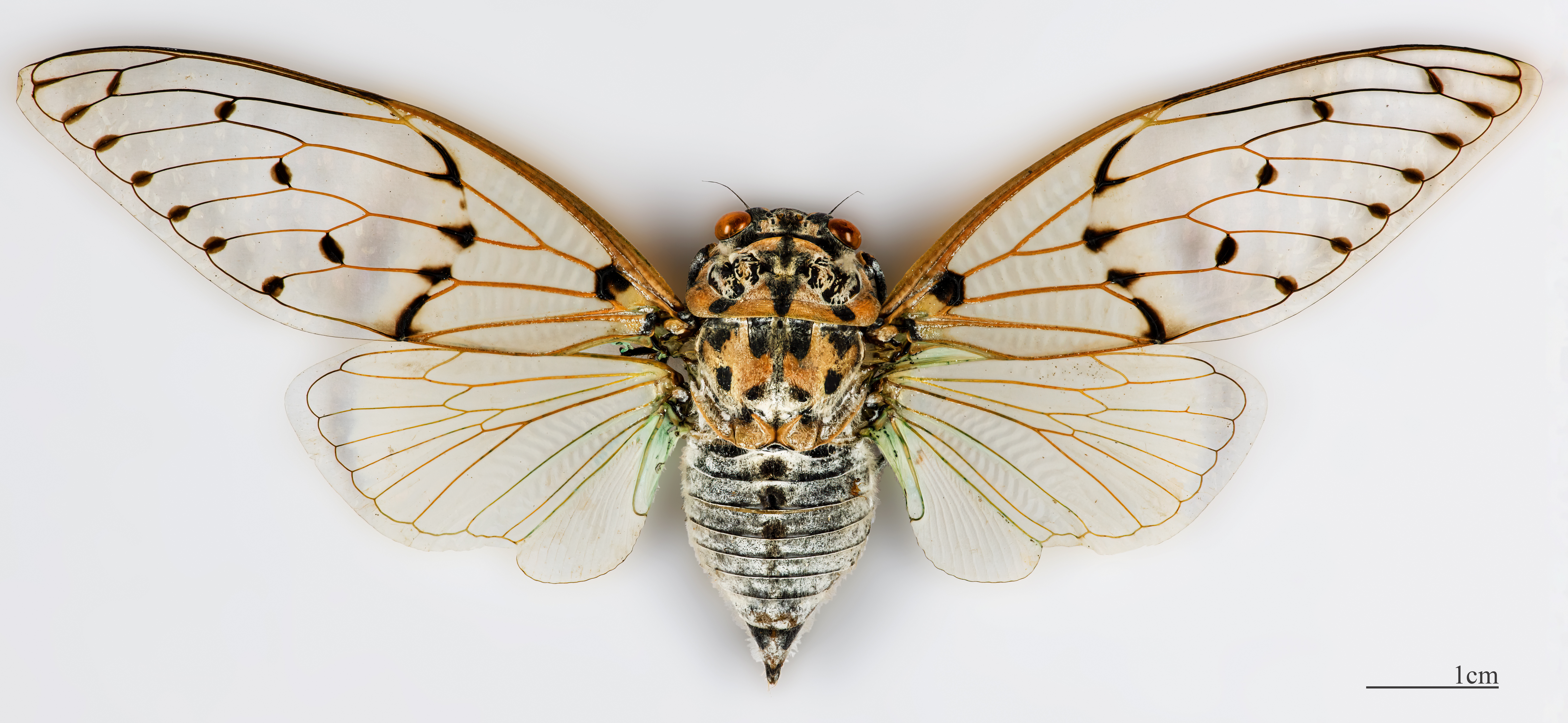
♀ MHNT

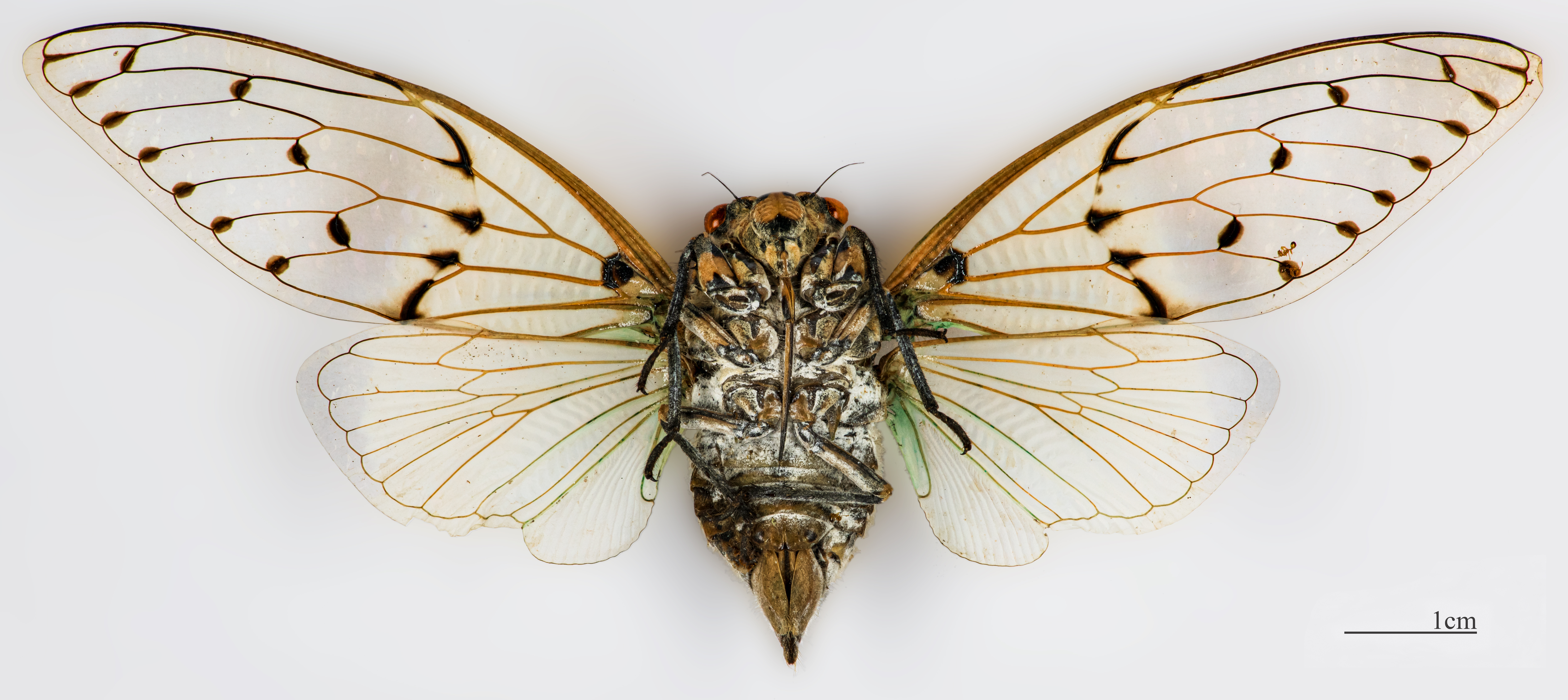
♀ △ MHNT
