= Metapurana pryeri =

Scientific classification
- Kingdom: Animalia
- Phylum: Arthropoda
- Clade: Pancrustacea
- Class: Insecta
- Order: Hemiptera
- Suborder: Auchenorrhyncha
- Family: Cicadidae
- Subfamily: Cicadinae
- Tribe: Leptopsaltriini
- Subtribe: Puranina
- Genus: Metapurana
- Species: M. pryeri

Binomial name
- Metapurana pryeri (Distant, 1881)

Synonyms
- Purana pryeri [Distant, 1881)

Species of true bug

Metapurana pryeri is a cicada species that occurs in Borneo and Peninsular Malaysia where it is found in lowland areas.
