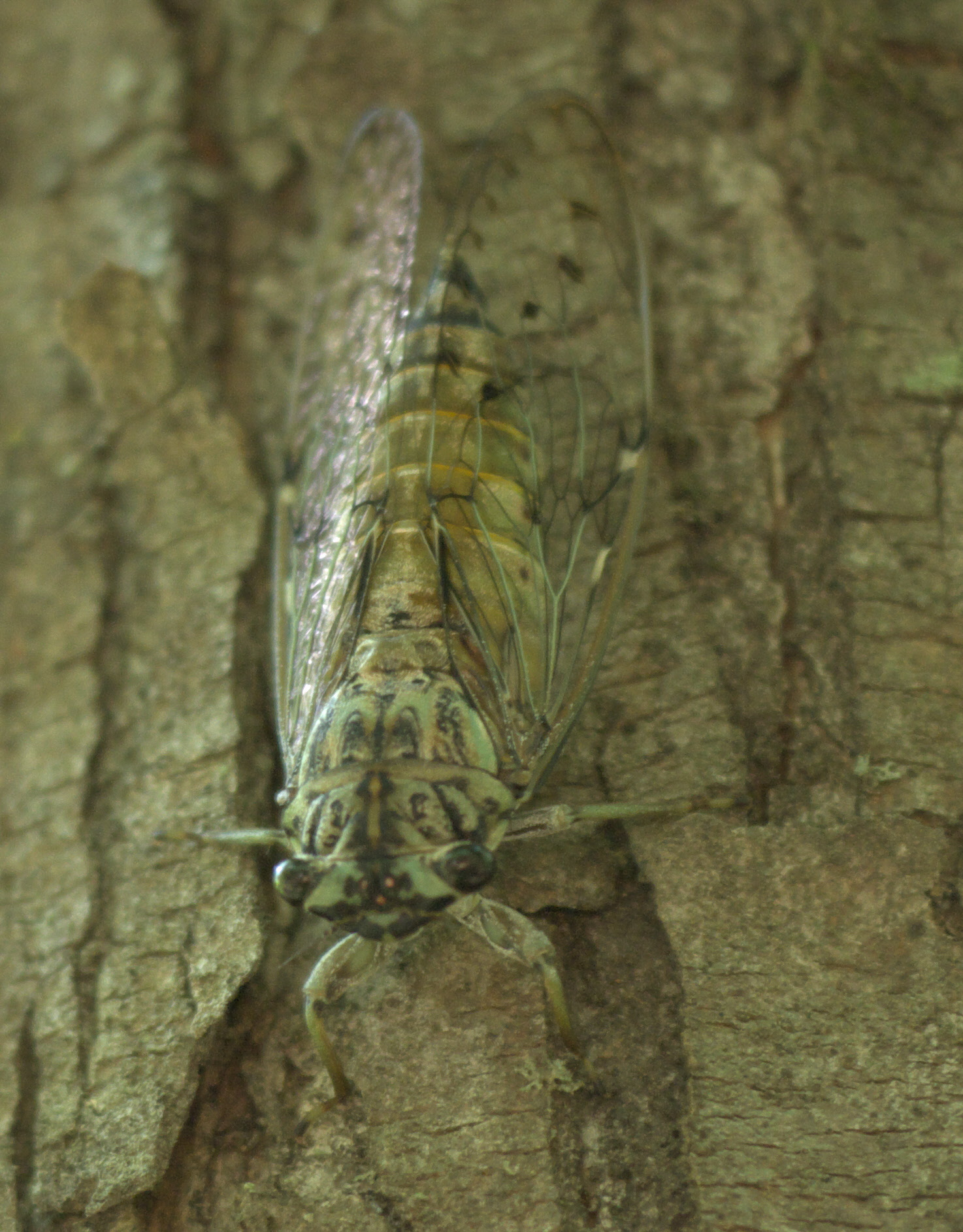

Scientific classification
- Kingdom: Animalia
- Phylum: Arthropoda
- Clade: Pancrustacea
- Class: Insecta
- Order: Hemiptera
- Suborder: Auchenorrhyncha
- Family: Cicadidae
- Genus: Neocicada
- Species: N. hieroglyphica

Binomial name
- Neocicada hieroglyphica (Say, 1830)

= Neocicada hieroglyphica =

Species of true bug

Neocicada hieroglyphica, the hieroglyphic cicada, is a species of cicada in the family Cicadidae. It is found in North America.

The hieroglyphic cicada is found west of Long Island, New York to eastern Kansas, and southward. It has black markings on its head and thorax.

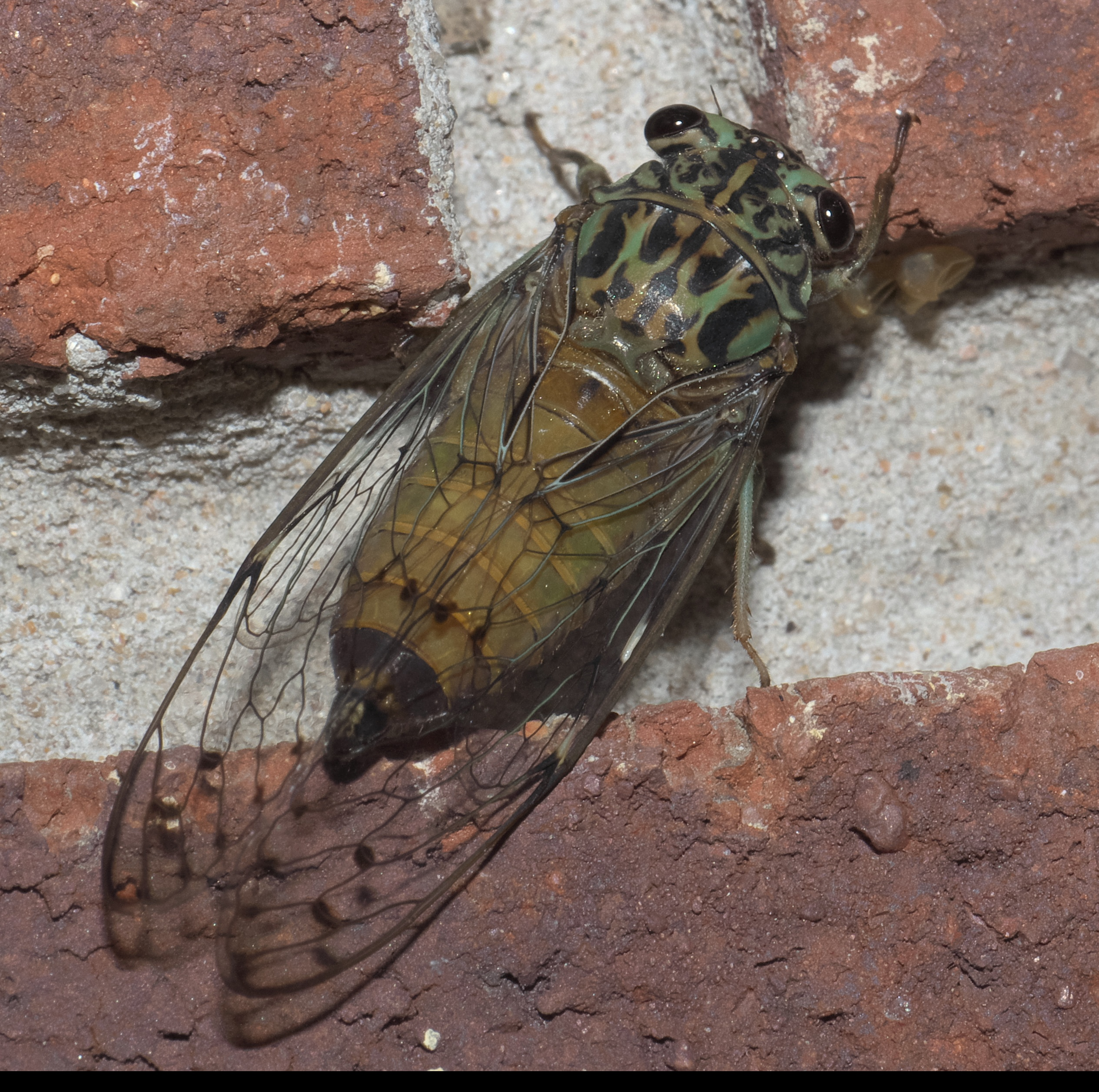
Hieroglyphic cicada, Neocicada hieroglyphics

== Subspecies ==
These two subspecies belong to N. hieroglyphica:

- N. h. hieroglyphica (Say, 1830)^{i}
- N. h. johannis (Walker, 1850)^{i c g}

Data sources: i = ITIS, c = Catalogue of Life, g = GBIF, b = Bugguide.net
