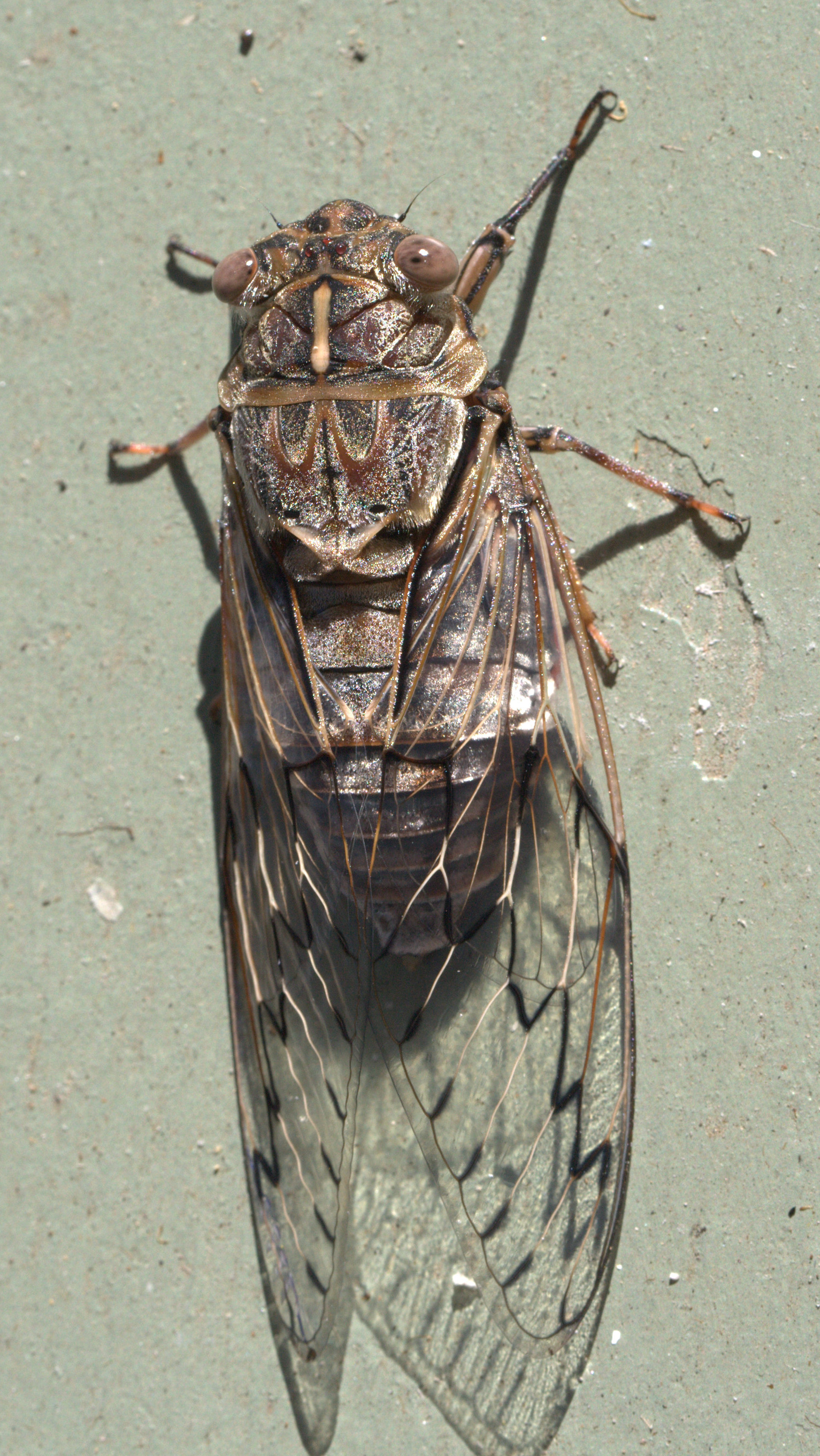
- Henicopsaltria eydouxii

Scientific classification
- Kingdom: Animalia
- Phylum: Arthropoda
- Clade: Pancrustacea
- Class: Insecta
- Order: Hemiptera
- Suborder: Auchenorrhyncha
- Superfamily: Cicadoidea
- Family: Cicadidae
- Subfamily: Cicadinae
- Tribe: Arenopsaltriini; Moulds, 2018

= Arenopsaltriini =

Tribe of true bugs

Arenopsaltriini is a tribe of cicadas in the family Cicadidae, found in Australia. There are at least two genera and about seven described species in Arenopsaltriini.

== Genera ==
These two genera belong to the tribe Arenopsaltriini:

- Arenopsaltria Ashton, 1921^{c g}
- Henicopsaltria Stål, 1866^{c g}

Data sources: i = ITIS, c = Catalogue of Life, g = GBIF, b = Bugguide.net
