= Neocicada chisos =

Scientific classification
- Kingdom: Animalia
- Phylum: Arthropoda
- Clade: Pancrustacea
- Class: Insecta
- Order: Hemiptera
- Suborder: Auchenorrhyncha
- Family: Cicadidae
- Tribe: Leptopsaltriini
- Genus: Neocicada
- Species: N. chisos

Binomial name
- Neocicada chisos (Davis, 1916)

Species of true bug

Neocicada chisos, the chisos cicada, is a species of cicada in the family Cicadidae. It is found in Central America and North America.
