= Henicopsaltria kelsalli =

Scientific classification
- Kingdom: Animalia
- Phylum: Arthropoda
- Clade: Pancrustacea
- Class: Insecta
- Order: Hemiptera
- Suborder: Auchenorrhyncha
- Family: Cicadidae
- Genus: Henicopsaltria
- Species: H. kelsalli

Binomial name
- Henicopsaltria kelsalli Distant, 1910

Species of true bug

Henicopsaltria kelsalli, commonly known as the Cape York grinder, is a large species of cicada native to the Cape York Peninsula in northeastern Australia.
