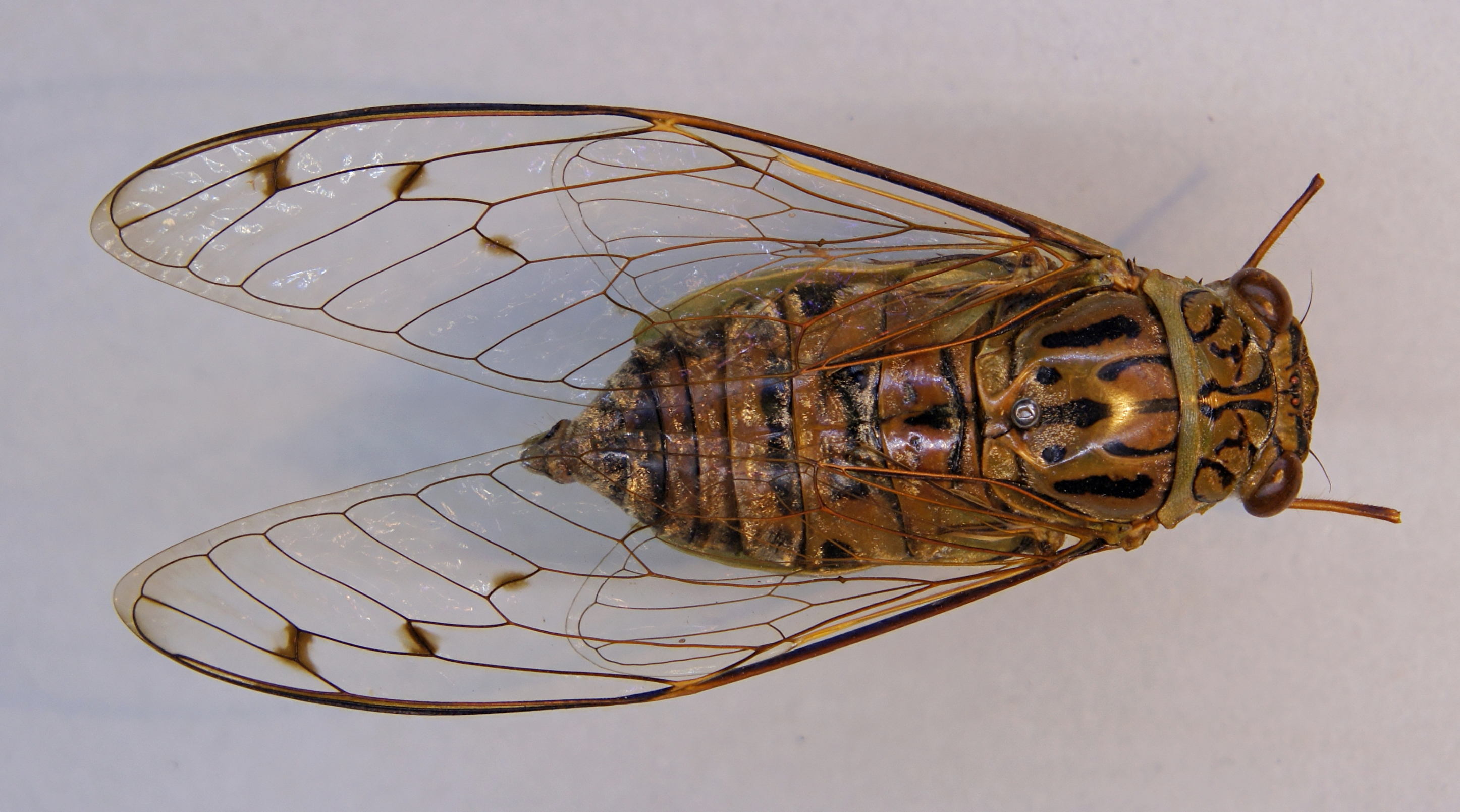
- Dilobopyga gemina

Scientific classification
- Domain: Eukaryota
- Kingdom: Animalia
- Phylum: Arthropoda
- Class: Insecta
- Order: Hemiptera
- Suborder: Auchenorrhyncha
- Superfamily: Cicadoidea
- Family: Cicadidae
- Subfamily: Cicadinae
- Tribe: Cosmopsaltriini; Kato, 1932

= Cosmopsaltriini =

Tribe of true bugs

Cosmopsaltriini is a tribe of cicadas in the family Cicadidae. There are at least 90 described species in Cosmopsaltriini, found in Southeast Asia, Australasia, and Oceania.

== Genera ==
These genera belong to the tribe Cosmopsaltriini:

1. Aceropyga Duffels, 1977
2. Brachylobopyga Duffels, 1982
3. Cosmopsaltria Stål, 1866
4. Diceropyga Stål, 1870
5. Dilobopyga Duffels, 1977
6. Inflatopyga Duffels, 1997
7. Moana Myers, 1928
8. Rhadinopyga Duffels, 1985
