= Metapurana =

Scientific classification
- Domain: Eukaryota
- Kingdom: Animalia
- Phylum: Arthropoda
- Class: Insecta
- Order: Hemiptera
- Suborder: Auchenorrhyncha
- Family: Cicadidae
- Tribe: Leptopsaltriini
- Subtribe: Puranina
- Genus: Metapurana; Lee, 2024

Genus of cicadas

External image
- Images at iNaturalist

Metapurana is a genus of Asian cicadas in the tribe Leptopsaltriini (subtribe Puranina), erected by Young June Lee in 2024. This formed part of his review of the genus Purana and the prefix is named from the Greek μετα-: meaning different. Species have been recorded from Indochina and Malesia.

== Species ==
The World Auchenorrhyncha Database includes:

1. Metapurana capricornis (Kos & Gogala, 2000)
2. Metapurana montana (Kos & Gogala, 2000)
3. Metapurana nebulilinea (Walker, 1868) - type species (as Dundubia nebulilinea Walker, 1868)
4. Metapurana niasica (Kos & Gogala, 2000)
5. Metapurana parvituberculata (Kos & Gogala, 2000)
6. Metapurana pryeri (Distant, 1881)
