= Diceropyga subapicalis =

Scientific classification
- Kingdom: Animalia
- Phylum: Arthropoda
- Clade: Pancrustacea
- Class: Insecta
- Order: Hemiptera
- Suborder: Auchenorrhyncha
- Family: Cicadidae
- Genus: Diceropyga
- Species: D. subapicalis

Binomial name
- Diceropyga subapicalis (Walker, 1868)

Synonyms
- Dundubia subapicalis Walker, 1868; Dundubia obtecta Kirkaldy, 1905; Cosmopsaltria atra Distant, 1897

Species of cicada

Diceropyga subapicalis, also known as the Australian dicer, is a species of cicada in the true cicada family. It occurs in Australia and New Guinea. It was described in 1868 by English entomologist Francis Walker.

== Description ==
The species has a forewing length of 32–41 mm.

== Distribution and habitat ==
The species is found in New Guinea, the Aru Islands, Darnley Island in Torres Strait, and the Cape York region of north-eastern Queensland, where it occurs in tropical rainforest habitats.

== Behaviour ==
Adults may be heard from December to July, clinging to the trunks and branches of rainforest trees, uttering coarse, metallic, buzzing calls.
