= Antankariini =

Scientific classification
- Kingdom: Animalia
- Phylum: Arthropoda
- Class: Insecta
- Order: Hemiptera
- Suborder: Auchenorrhyncha
- Family: Cicadidae
- Subfamily: Cicadinae
- Tribe: Antankariini; Sanborn, 2021

Type genus
- Antankaria Distant, 1904

Diversity
- 2 genera 10 species

Tribe of cicadas

Antankariini is a tribe of cicadas in the family Cicadidae. It was established by Allen F. Sanborn in 2021 to accommodate former Malagasy members of the former tribe Cryptotympanini.

== Distribution ==
Members of Antankariini are found in Madagascar and the Seychelles.

== Genera ==
The tribe contains two genera:

- Antankaria Distant, 1904
  - A. madagascariensis (Distant, 1892)
- Orientafroinsularis Sanborn, 2021
  - O. elenae (Boulard, 2001)
  - O. hova (Distant, 1905)
  - O. loici (Boulard, 2000)
  - O. martini (Distant, 1905)
  - O. matilei (Boulard, 2000)
  - O. nigrans (Distant, 1904)
  - O. pulverulenta (Distant, 1905)
  - O. seychellica (Dmitriev, 2020)
  - O. seychellensis (Boulard, 1999)
