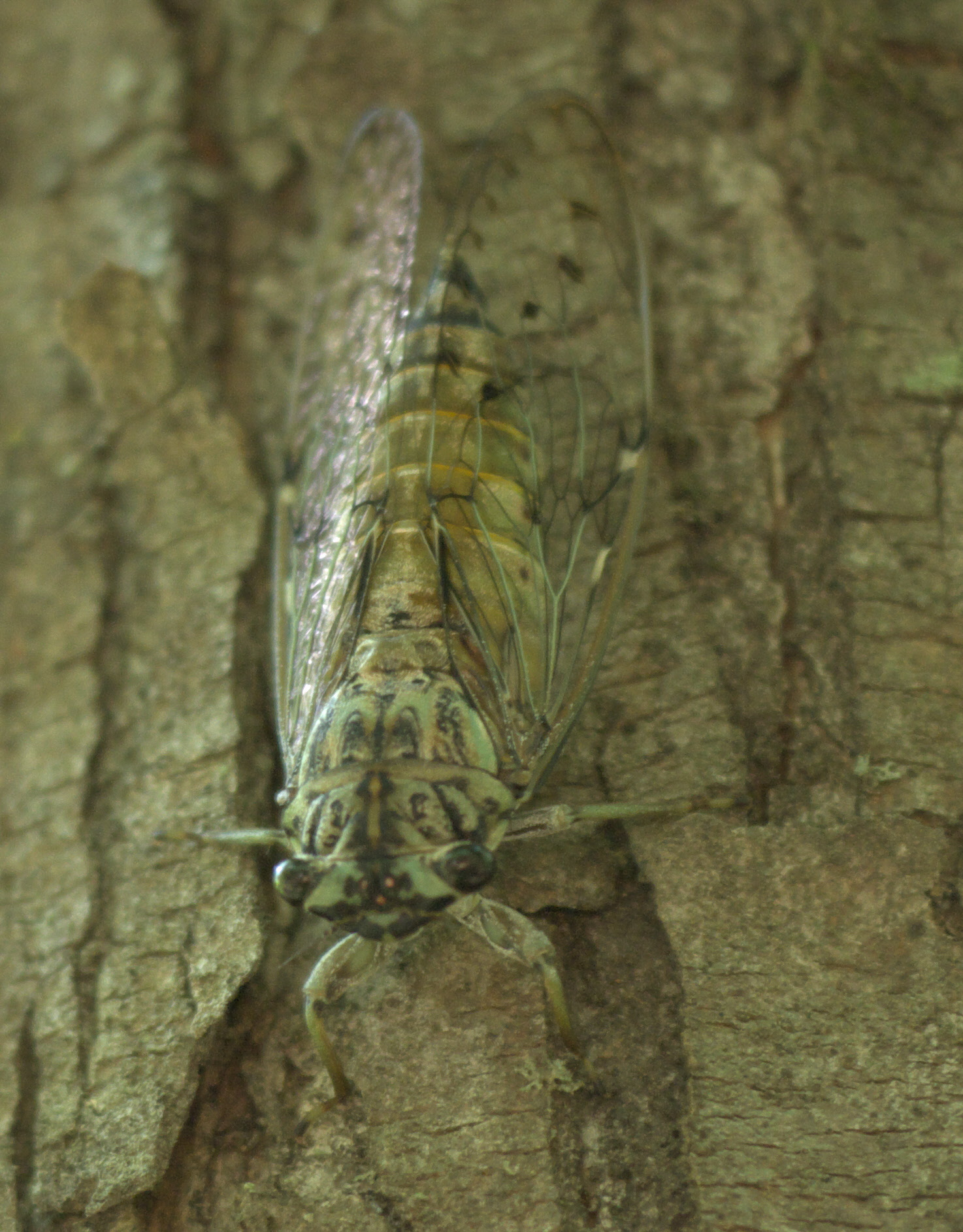
- Neocicada hieroglyphica

Scientific classification
- Kingdom: Animalia
- Phylum: Arthropoda
- Clade: Pancrustacea
- Class: Insecta
- Order: Hemiptera
- Suborder: Auchenorrhyncha
- Family: Cicadidae
- Subfamily: Cicadinae
- Tribe: Leptopsaltriini
- Genus: Neocicada; Kato, 1932

= Neocicada =

Genus of true bugs

Neocicada is a genus of mostly North and Central American cicadas in the tribe Leptopsaltriini, with about five described species.

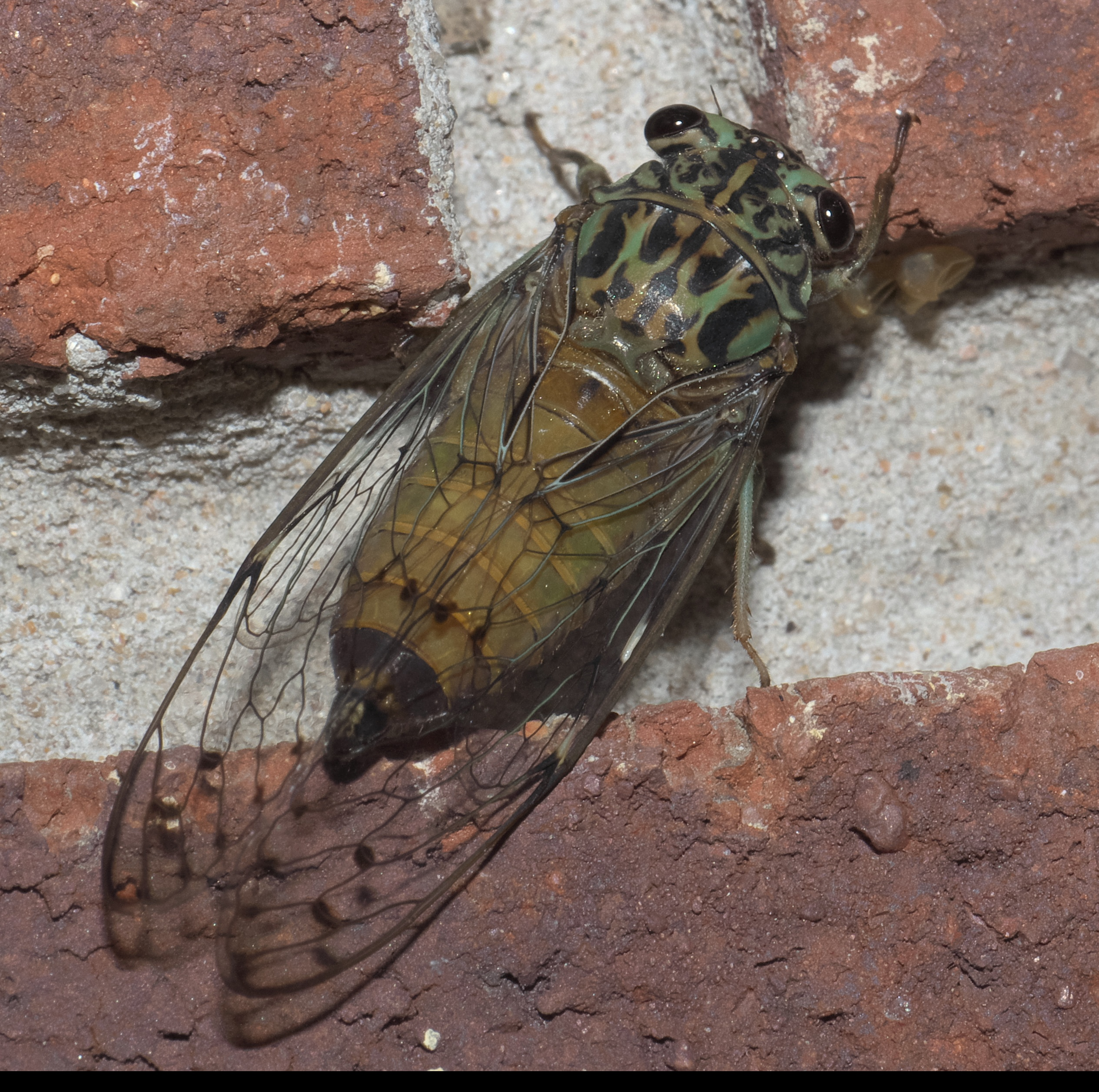
Neocicada hieroglyphica

== Species ==
These five species are:

- Neocicada australamexicana Sanborn and Sueur in Sanborn, Heath, Sueur and Phillips, 2005^{i c g}
- Neocicada centramericana Sanborn in Sanborn, Heath, Sueur and Phillips, 2005^{i c g}
- Neocicada chisos (Davis, 1916)^{i c g b} (chisos cicada)
- Neocicada hieroglyphica (Say, 1830)^{i c g b} (hieroglyphic cicada)
- Neocicada mediamexicana Sanborn in Sanborn, Heath, Sueur and Phillips, 2005^{i c g}

Data sources: i = ITIS, c = Catalogue of Life, g = GBIF, b = Bugguide.net
