= Henicopsaltria rufivelum =

Scientific classification
- Kingdom: Animalia
- Phylum: Arthropoda
- Clade: Pancrustacea
- Class: Insecta
- Order: Hemiptera
- Suborder: Auchenorrhyncha
- Family: Cicadidae
- Genus: Henicopsaltria
- Species: H. rufivelum

Binomial name
- Henicopsaltria rufivelum Moulds, 1978

Species of true bug

Henicopsaltria rufivelum, commonly known as the jungle grinder, is a large species of cicada native to northeastern Australia.
