= Henicopsaltria danielsi =

Scientific classification
- Kingdom: Animalia
- Phylum: Arthropoda
- Clade: Pancrustacea
- Class: Insecta
- Order: Hemiptera
- Suborder: Auchenorrhyncha
- Family: Cicadidae
- Genus: Henicopsaltria
- Species: H. danielsi

Binomial name
- Henicopsaltria danielsi Moulds, 1993

Species of true bug

Henicopsaltria danielsi, commonly known as the McIvor River grinder, is a large species of cicada found near Cooktown in northeastern Australia.
