= Cicadmalleus =

Scientific classification
- Kingdom: Animalia
- Phylum: Arthropoda
- Clade: Pancrustacea
- Class: Insecta
- Order: Hemiptera
- Suborder: Auchenorrhyncha
- Superfamily: Cicadoidea
- Family: Cicadidae
- Subfamily: Cicadinae
- Tribe: Cicadmalleuini
- Genus: Cicadmalleus; Boulard & Puissant, 2013

Genus of true bugs

Cicadmalleus is a genus of cicadas in the family Cicadidae, found in Indomalaya (Thailand). There is at least one described species in Cicadmalleus, C. micheli.

Cicadmalleus is the only genus of the tribe Cicadmalleuini.
