= Durangona =

Scientific classification
- Kingdom: Animalia
- Phylum: Arthropoda
- Clade: Pancrustacea
- Class: Insecta
- Order: Hemiptera
- Suborder: Auchenorrhyncha
- Superfamily: Cicadoidea
- Family: Cicadidae
- Subfamily: Cicadinae
- Tribe: Durangonini
- Genus: Durangona; Distant, 1911

Genus of true bugs

Durangona is a genus of cicadas in the family Cicadidae and the monotypic tribe Durangonini, found in South America.

== Species ==
BioLib includes the following described species:

1. Durangona exechopyga Sanborn, 2020
2. Durangona tigrina Distant, 1911
