= Derotettix =

Scientific classification
- Domain: Eukaryota
- Kingdom: Animalia
- Phylum: Arthropoda
- Class: Insecta
- Order: Hemiptera
- Suborder: Auchenorrhyncha
- Family: Cicadidae
- Subfamily: Derotettiginae
- Genus: Derotettix; Berg, 1882

Species
- D. mendosensis Berg, 1882; D. wagneri Distant, 1905

Genus of true bugs

Derotettix is a genus of cicada in the Derotettigini tribe of the Derotettiginae subfamily native to Argentina. Two species have been described.
