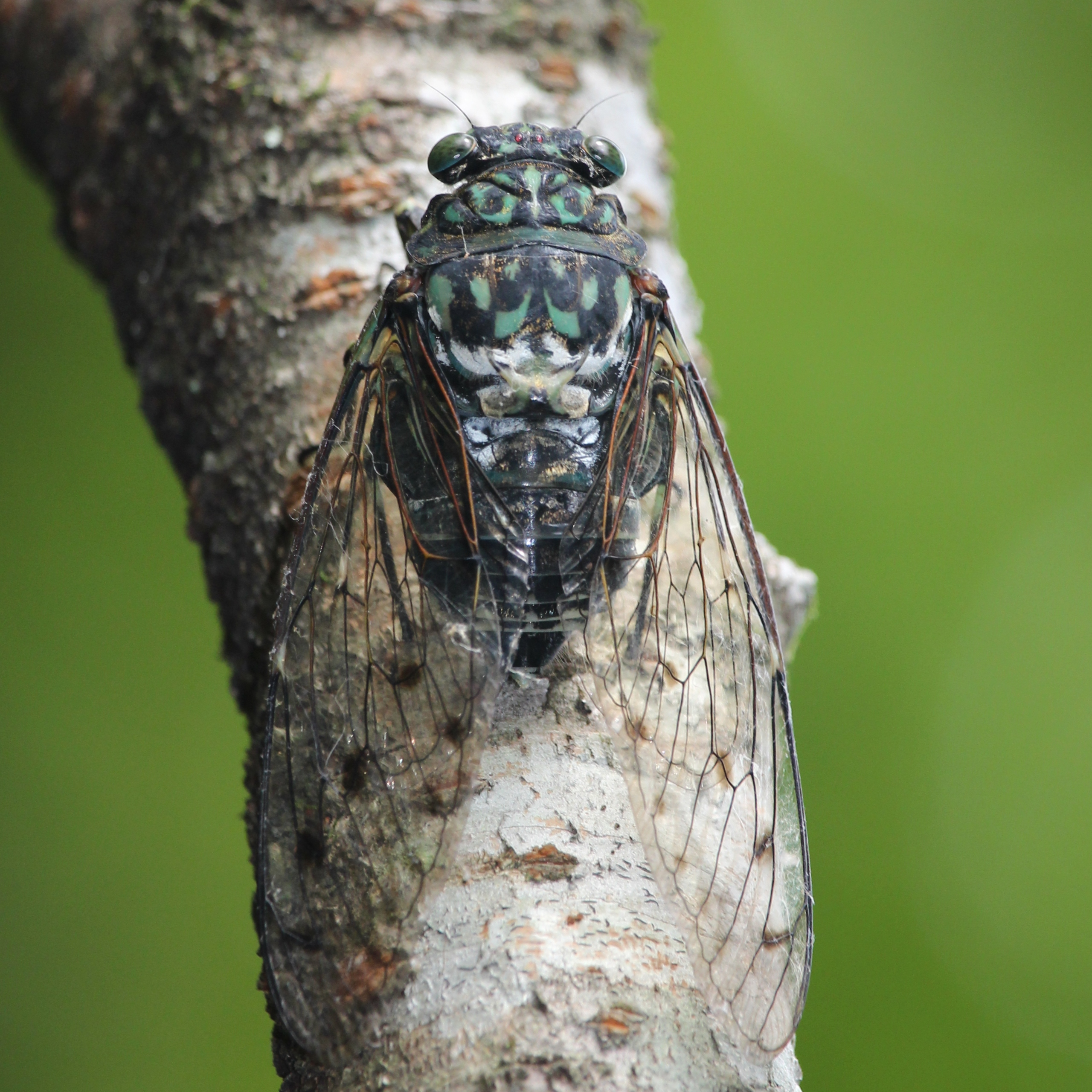

Scientific classification
- Kingdom: Animalia
- Phylum: Arthropoda
- Clade: Pancrustacea
- Class: Insecta
- Order: Hemiptera
- Suborder: Auchenorrhyncha
- Superfamily: Cicadoidea
- Family: Cicadidae
- Subfamily: Cicadinae
- Tribe: Oncotympanini; Ishihara, 1961

= Oncotympanini =

Tribe of true bugs

Oncotympanini is a tribe of cicadas in the family Cicadidae, found in China and southeast Asia. There are at least 3 genera and about 12 described species in Oncotympanini.

== Genera ==
These three genera belong to the tribe Oncotympanini:

- Mata Distant, 1906^{c g}
- Neoncotympana Lee, 2010^{c g}
- Oncotympana Stål, 1870^{c g}

Data sources: i = ITIS, c = Catalogue of Life, g = GBIF, b = Bugguide.net
