= Mapondera (cicada) =

Scientific classification
- Kingdom: Animalia
- Phylum: Arthropoda
- Clade: Pancrustacea
- Class: Insecta
- Order: Hemiptera
- Suborder: Auchenorrhyncha
- Family: Cicadidae
- Genus: Mapondera

Genus of true bugs

Mapondera is a genus of cicadas in the family Cicadidae. There are at least two described species in Mapondera.

== Species ==
These two species belong to the genus Mapondera:

- Mapondera capicola Kirkaldy, 1909^{c g}
- Mapondera hottentota Kirkaldy, 1909^{c g}

Data sources: i = ITIS, c = Catalogue of Life, g = GBIF, b = Bugguide.net
