= Lycurgus (cicada) =

Scientific classification
- Kingdom: Animalia
- Phylum: Arthropoda
- Clade: Pancrustacea
- Class: Insecta
- Order: Hemiptera
- Suborder: Auchenorrhyncha
- Family: Cicadidae
- Genus: Lycurgus

Genus of true bugs

Lycurgus is a genus of cicadas in the family Cicadidae. There are at least three described species in Lycurgus.

== Species ==
These three species belong to the genus Lycurgus:

- Lycurgus conspersus (Karsch, 1890)^{c g}
- Lycurgus frontalis (Karsch, 1890)^{c g}
- Lycurgus subvittus (Walker, F., 1850)^{c g}

Data sources: i = ITIS, c = Catalogue of Life, g = GBIF, b = Bugguide.net
