= Derotettiginae =

Scientific classification
- Domain: Eukaryota
- Kingdom: Animalia
- Phylum: Arthropoda
- Class: Insecta
- Order: Hemiptera
- Suborder: Auchenorrhyncha
- Family: Cicadidae
- Subfamily: Derotettiginae; Moulds, 2019

Type genus
- Derotettix

Subfamily of true bugs

Derotettiginae is a subfamily of cicadas and includes two species Derotettix mendosensis Berg, 1882 and Derotettix wagneri Distant, 1905. It is restricted to the Dry Chaco and Monte de Llanuras y Mesettas ecoregions of Argentina.

The subfamily characters include the head with eyes being wider than the width of the pronotum, a postclypeus that is rounded in transverse cross section. The mesonotum has no sound producing structures and the forewing has no pterostigma. The sole tribe Derotettigini within the subfamily is distinguished by the presence of a small prostrate primary femoral spine and no other spines. The male genitalia has the uncus not retractable within the pygofer. The aedeagus has a broad and flat theca. The forewing has seven apical cells.
