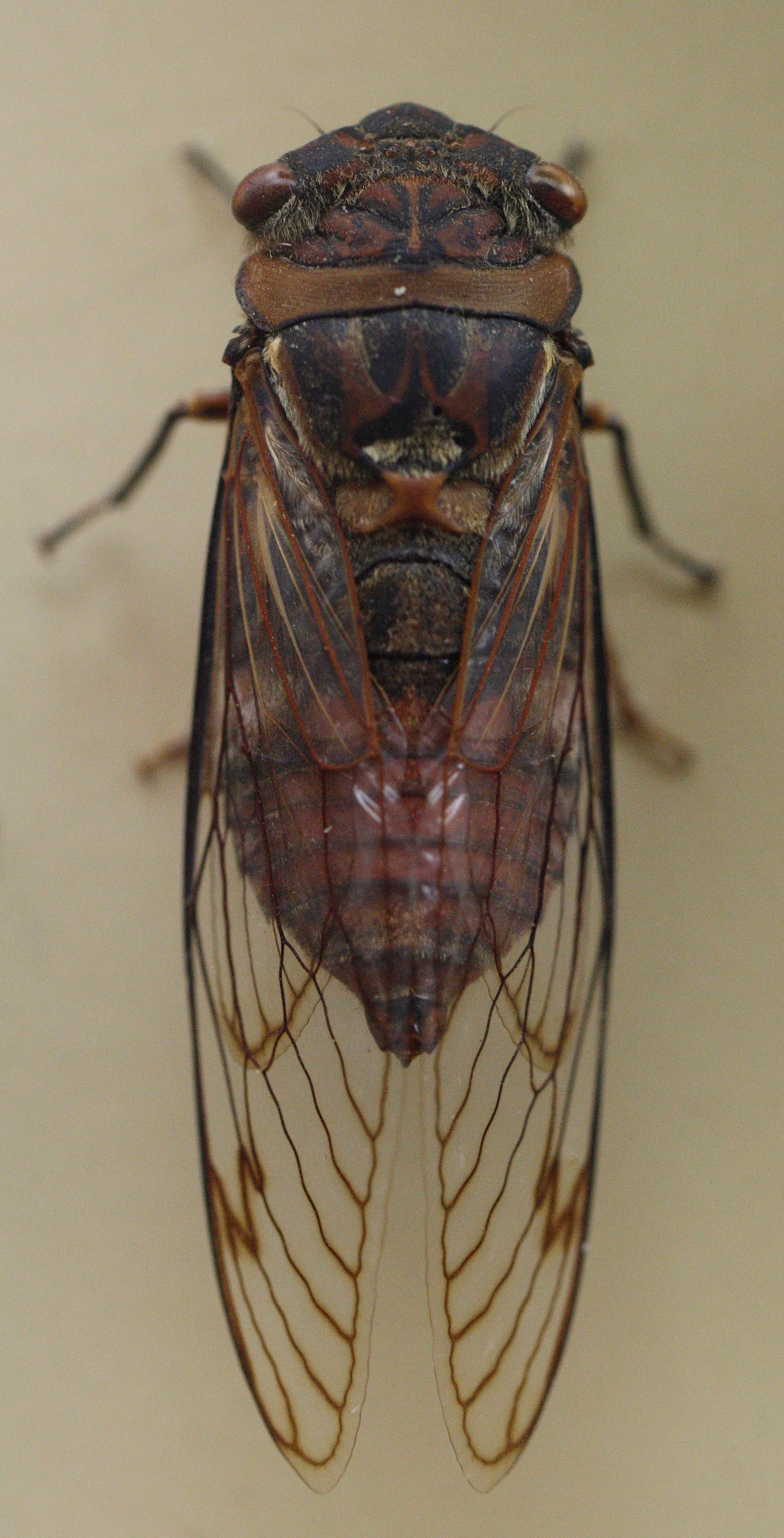
- Psaltoda aurora

Scientific classification
- Kingdom: Animalia
- Phylum: Arthropoda
- Clade: Pancrustacea
- Class: Insecta
- Order: Hemiptera
- Suborder: Auchenorrhyncha
- Superfamily: Cicadoidea
- Family: Cicadidae
- Subfamily: Cicadinae
- Tribe: Psaltodini; Moulds, 2018

= Psaltodini =

Tribe of true bugs

Psaltodini is a tribe of cicadas in the family Cicadidae, found in Australia. There are at least 3 genera and about 17 described species in Psaltodini.

== Genera ==
These three genera belong to the tribe Psaltodini:

- Anapsaltoda Ashton, 1921
- Neopsaltoda Distant, 1910
- Psaltoda Stål, 1861
