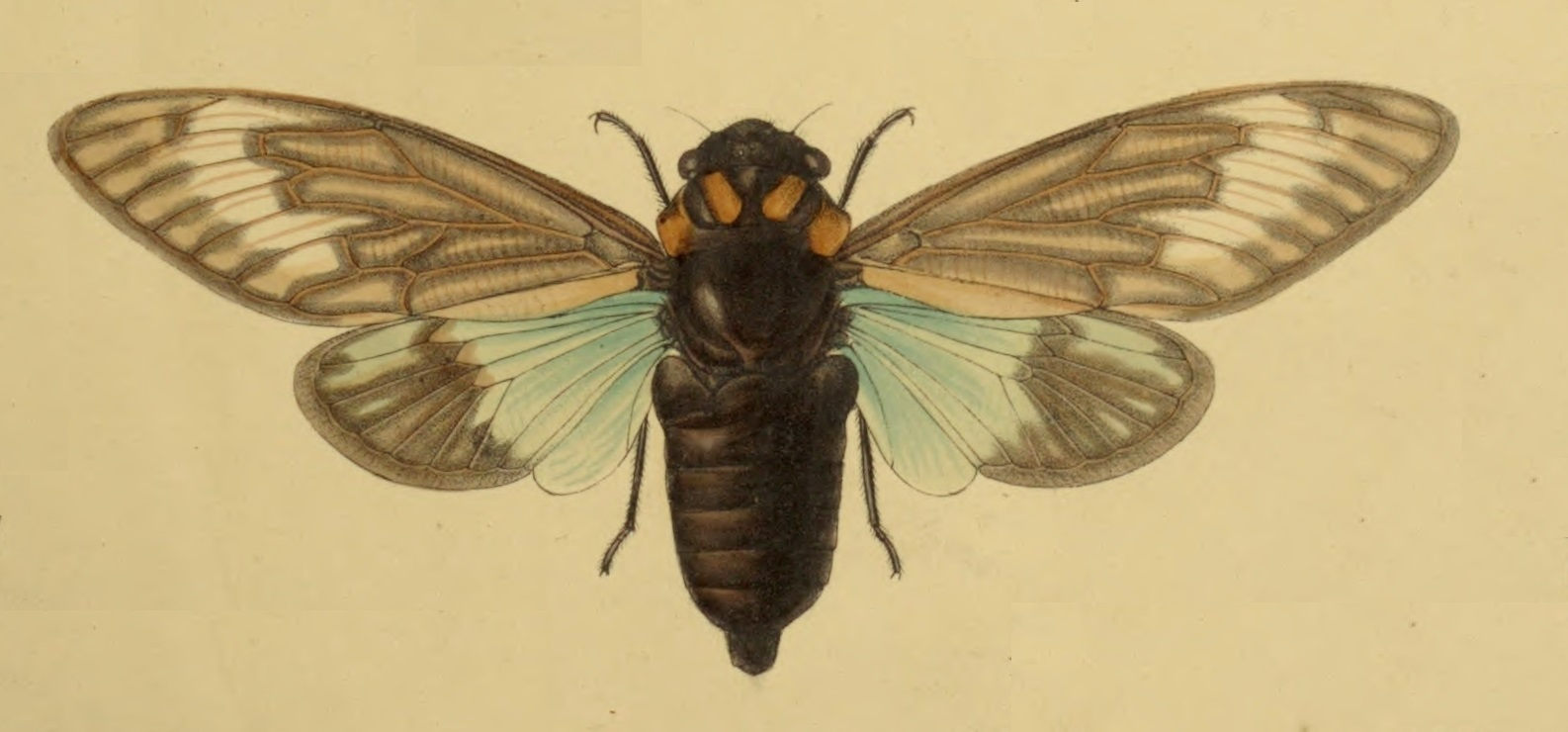
- Distantalna splendida

Scientific classification
- Kingdom: Animalia
- Phylum: Arthropoda
- Class: Insecta
- Order: Hemiptera
- Suborder: Auchenorrhyncha
- Family: Cicadidae
- Subfamily: Cicadinae
- Tribe: Ayuthiini
- Genus: Distantalna; Boulard, 2009
- Species: D. splendida

Binomial name
- Distantalna splendida (Distant, 1878)

Synonyms
- Tosena splendida Distant, 1878

= Distantalna splendida =

Species of true bug

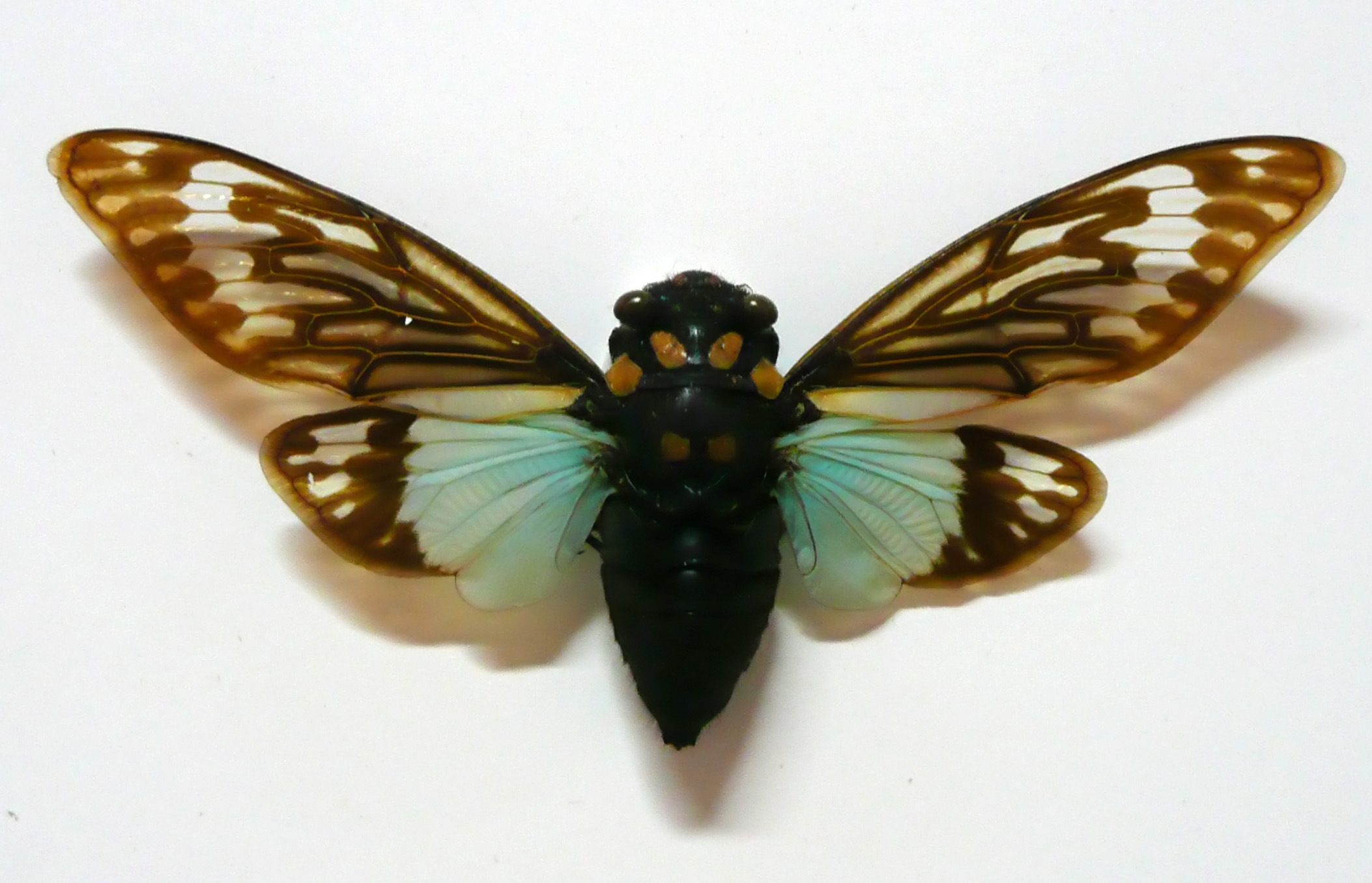
Specimen of Distantalna splendida

Distantalna splendida is a cicada species from Southeast Asia, and the sole member of the genus Distantalna. It was previously included in the genus Tosena, but is now placed in the tribe Ayuthiini. It was described by William Lucas Distant in 1878. A characteristic that distinguishes Distantalna splendida from the Tosena species is the partly pale hyaline tegmina and wings. The species of Tosena do not have hyaline parts in the tegmina and wings. It has been recorded from India, Myanmar and Thailand.
