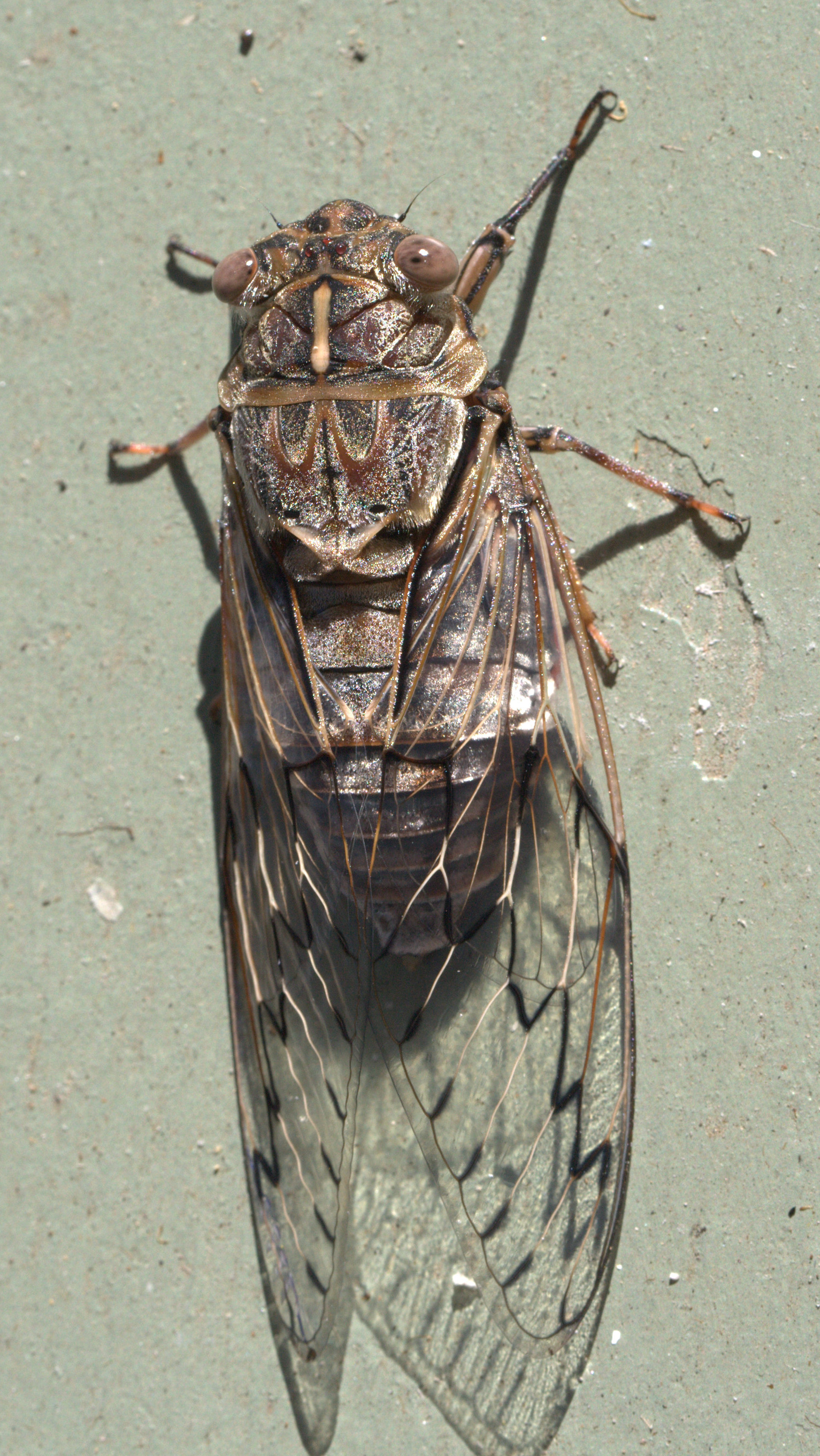

Scientific classification
- Kingdom: Animalia
- Phylum: Arthropoda
- Clade: Pancrustacea
- Class: Insecta
- Order: Hemiptera
- Suborder: Auchenorrhyncha
- Family: Cicadidae
- Genus: Henicopsaltria
- Species: H. eydouxii

Binomial name
- Henicopsaltria eydouxii (Guérin-Méneville), 1838

Synonyms
- Cicada eydouxii Guérin-Méneville

= Henicopsaltria eydouxii =

Species of true bug

Henicopsaltria eydouxii, commonly known as the razor grinder, is a large species of cicada native to eastern Australia. Predominantly brown in colour, it is found in dry and wet sclerophyll forest in December and January and is quite common in Brisbane.

== Taxonomy ==
The razor grinder was first described in 1838 by Félix Édouard Guérin-Méneville as Cicada eydouxii before being moved to the new genus Henicopsaltria in 1866. It is the type species. Its common name refers to its harsh call, which has been likened to the noise of a metal grinder.

== Description ==
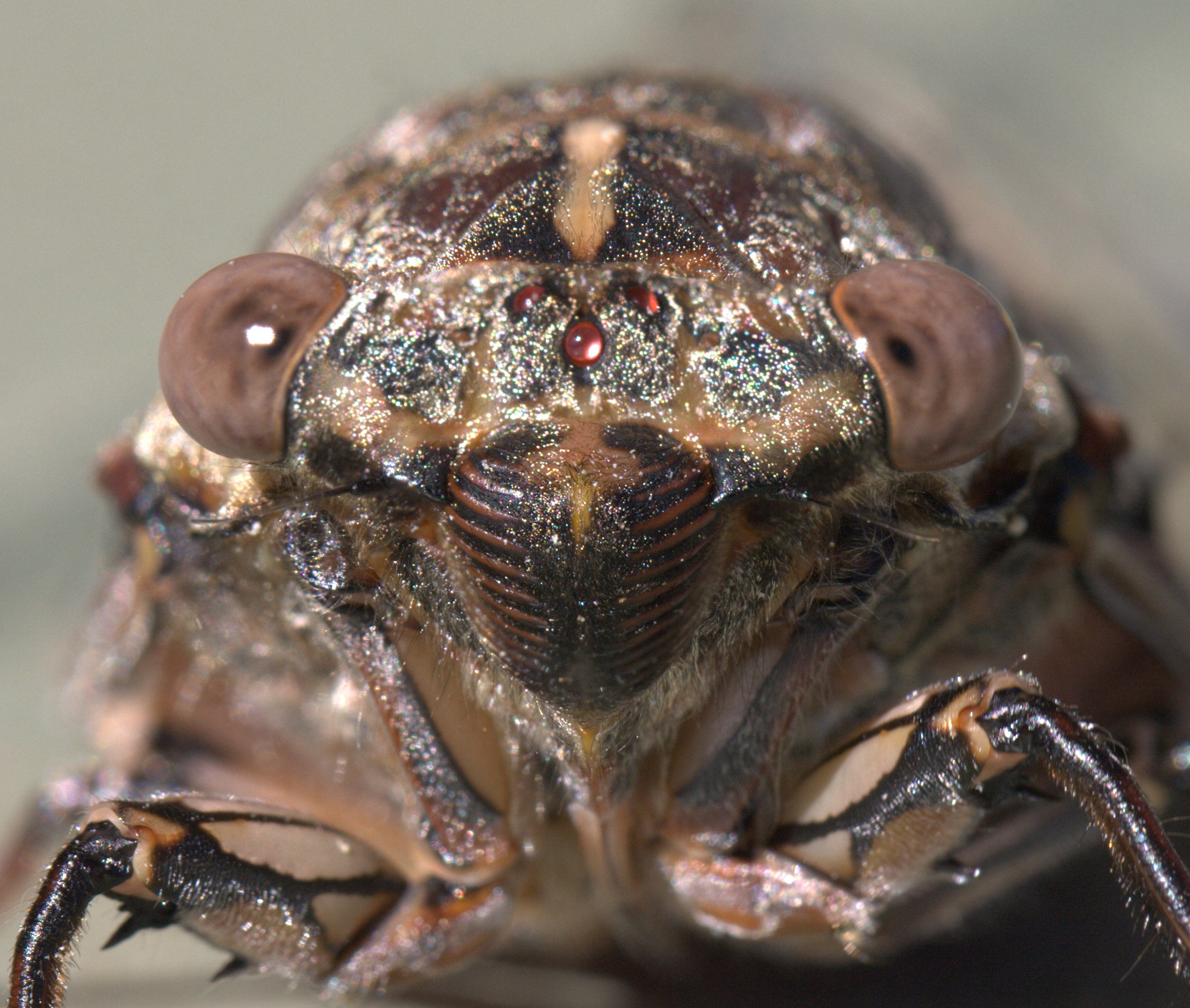
head detail

The razor grinder is a large cicada with a forewing measuring 50–55 mm (2.0–2.2 in). Males and females are similar in color and markings. The head and thorax is red-brown with black markings. The wings are transparent with some brown discoloration.

The male's call lasts for a few seconds, increases in volume, suddenly stops, and then suddenly starts again. They usually silently feed throughout the afternoon, and then groups call at maximum volume around dusk. There is a secondary population, referred to as the laughing razor grinder, which is only observed in rainforest and wet sclerophyll forest, and has a distinct call.

Razor grinders can also emit a distress call – a fragmented irregular noise – upon being seized by a predator.

== Behaviour ==
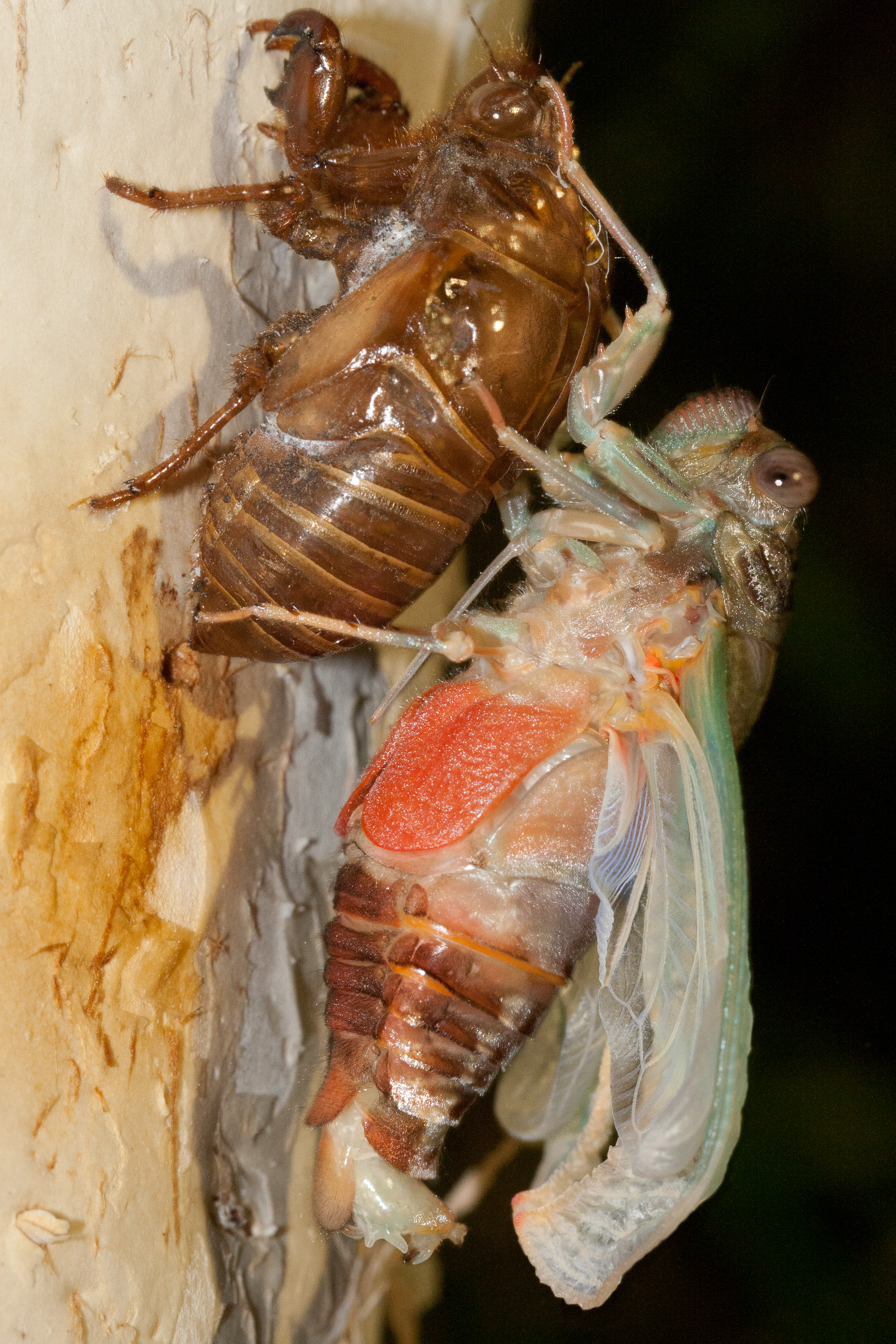
A razor grinder drying its wings after shedding its shell

Male razor grinders sing in large groups on the main trunks of tall eucalypts, especially spotted gum (Corymbia maculata). In some years their numbers can be locally immense, but in other years very few adults emerge.

Adult razor grinders are wary and flighty, especially at dusk, and are difficult to approach. They are fast flyers.

== Distribution and habitat ==
The razor grinder is found along the east coast of Australia from Gladstone in Central Queensland south to Narooma in southern New South Wales, generally below 500 m (550 yd) elevation. It reaches inland to Toowoomba, Inverell, Tamworth and the Capertee Valley. It is common in Brisbane, but uncommon in Sydney. There is also an isolated population in Cathu State Forest. Their habitat is dry or wet sclerophyll forest or rainforest margins. They are most visible in December and January, sometimes appearing in early November in some years.
