= Distantada =

Scientific classification
- Kingdom: Animalia
- Phylum: Arthropoda
- Clade: Pancrustacea
- Class: Insecta
- Order: Hemiptera
- Suborder: Auchenorrhyncha
- Superfamily: Cicadoidea
- Family: Cicadidae
- Subfamily: Cicadinae
- Tribe: Distantadini
- Genus: Distantada; Orian, 1963

Genus of true bugs

Distantada is a genus of cicadas in the family Cicadidae, found in the Mascarene Islands. There is at least one described species in Distantada, D. thomasseti.

Distantada is the only genus of the tribe Distantadini.
