= Lahugada =

Scientific classification
- Kingdom: Animalia
- Phylum: Arthropoda
- Clade: Pancrustacea
- Class: Insecta
- Order: Hemiptera
- Suborder: Auchenorrhyncha
- Superfamily: Cicadoidea
- Family: Cicadidae
- Subfamily: Cicadinae
- Tribe: Lahugadini
- Genus: Lahugada; Distant, 1905

Genus of true bugs

Lahugada is a genus of cicadas in the family Cicadidae, found in India. There is at least one described species in Lahugada, L. dohertyi.

Lahugada is the only genus of the tribe Lahugadini.
