= Plautilla (cicada) =

Scientific classification
- Kingdom: Animalia
- Phylum: Arthropoda
- Clade: Pancrustacea
- Class: Insecta
- Order: Hemiptera
- Suborder: Auchenorrhyncha
- Superfamily: Cicadoidea
- Family: Cicadidae
- Subfamily: Cicadinae
- Tribe: Plautillini
- Genus: Plautilla; Stål, 1865

Genus of true bugs

Plautilla is a genus of cicadas in the family Cicadidae, found in the Neotropics. There are at least three described species in Plautilla.

Plautilla is the only genus of the tribe Plautillini.

== Species ==
These three species belong to the genus Plautilla:

- Plautilla hammondi Distant, 1914
- Plautilla stalagmoptera Stål, 1865
- Plautilla venedictoffae Boulard, 1978
