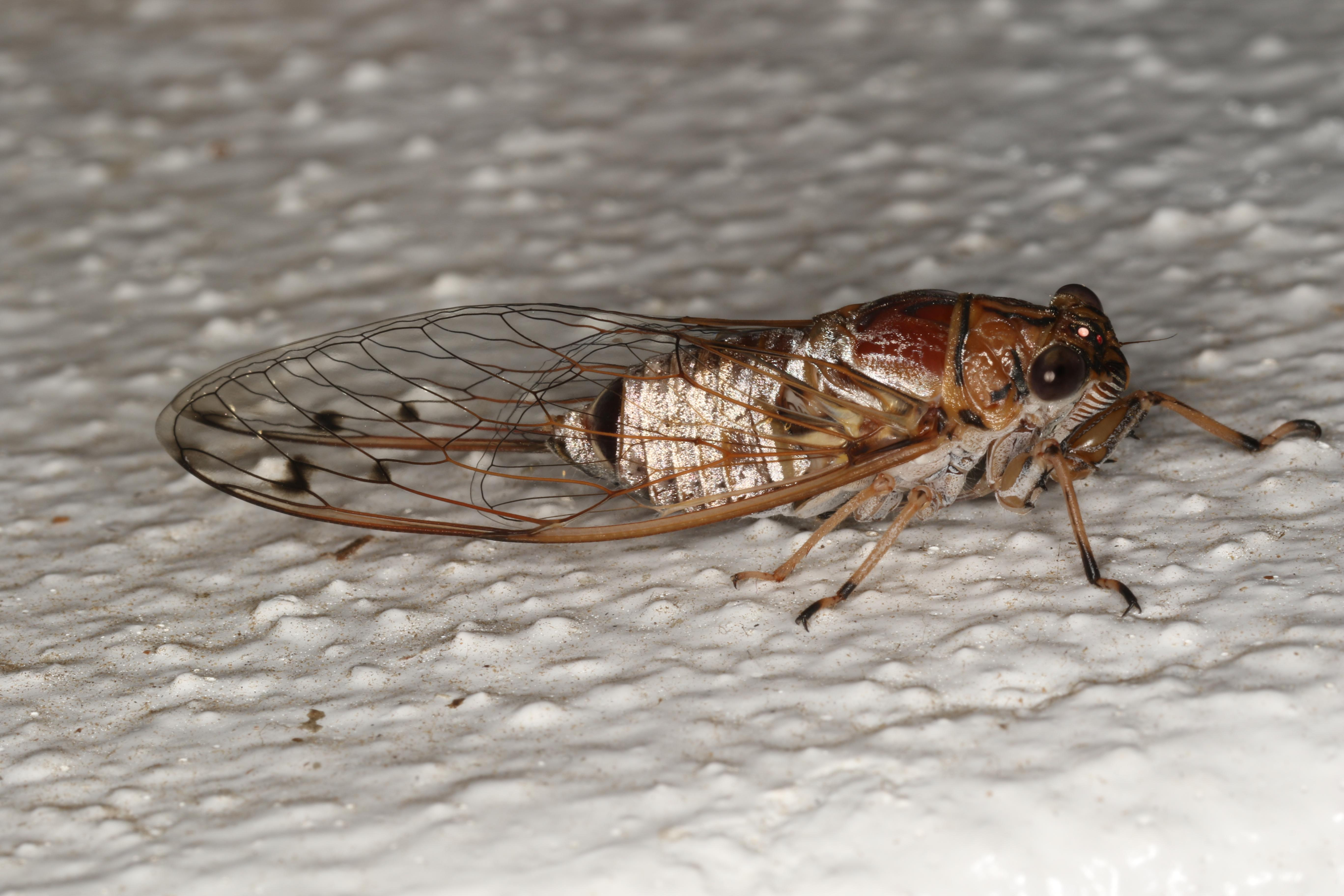
- Tamasa tristigma

Scientific classification
- Kingdom: Animalia
- Phylum: Arthropoda
- Clade: Pancrustacea
- Class: Insecta
- Order: Hemiptera
- Suborder: Auchenorrhyncha
- Superfamily: Cicadoidea
- Family: Cicadidae
- Subfamily: Cicadinae
- Tribe: Tamasini; Moulds, 2005

= Tamasini =

Tribe of true bugs

Tamasini is a tribe of cicadas in the family Cicadidae, found in Australia. There are at least three genera and about ten described species in Tamasini.

== Genera ==
These genera belong to the tribe Tamasini:

- Parnkalla Distant, 1905
- Parnquila Moulds, 2012
- Tamasa Distant, 1905
