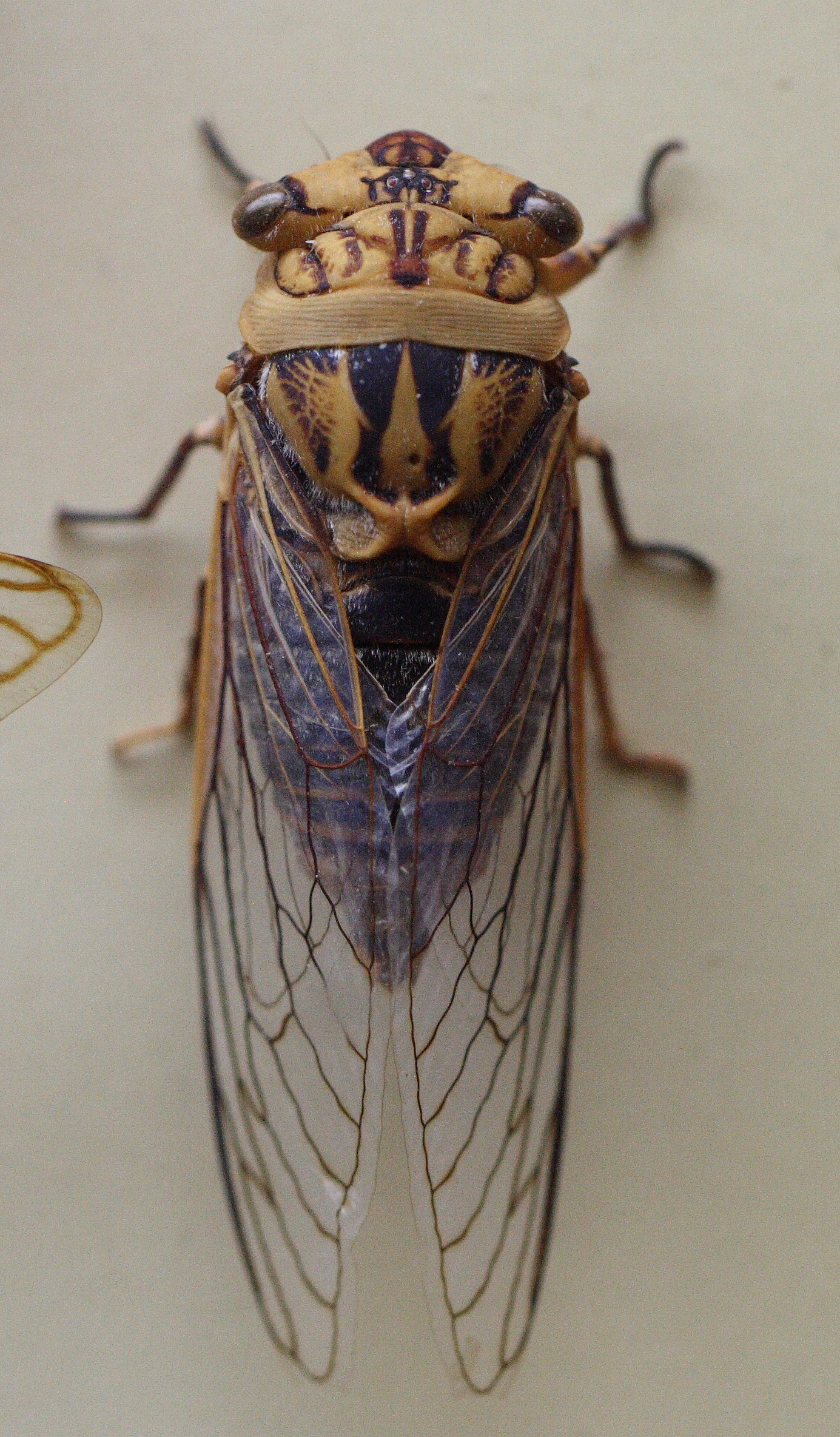
- Macrotristria godingi

Scientific classification
- Kingdom: Animalia
- Phylum: Arthropoda
- Clade: Pancrustacea
- Class: Insecta
- Order: Hemiptera
- Suborder: Auchenorrhyncha
- Family: Cicadidae
- Subfamily: Cicadinae
- Tribe: Macrotristriini; Moulds, 2018

= Macrotristriini =

Tribe of true bugs

Macrotristriini is a tribe of cicadas in the family Cicadidae. There are at least 2 genera and 20 described species in Macrotristriini, all found in Australia.

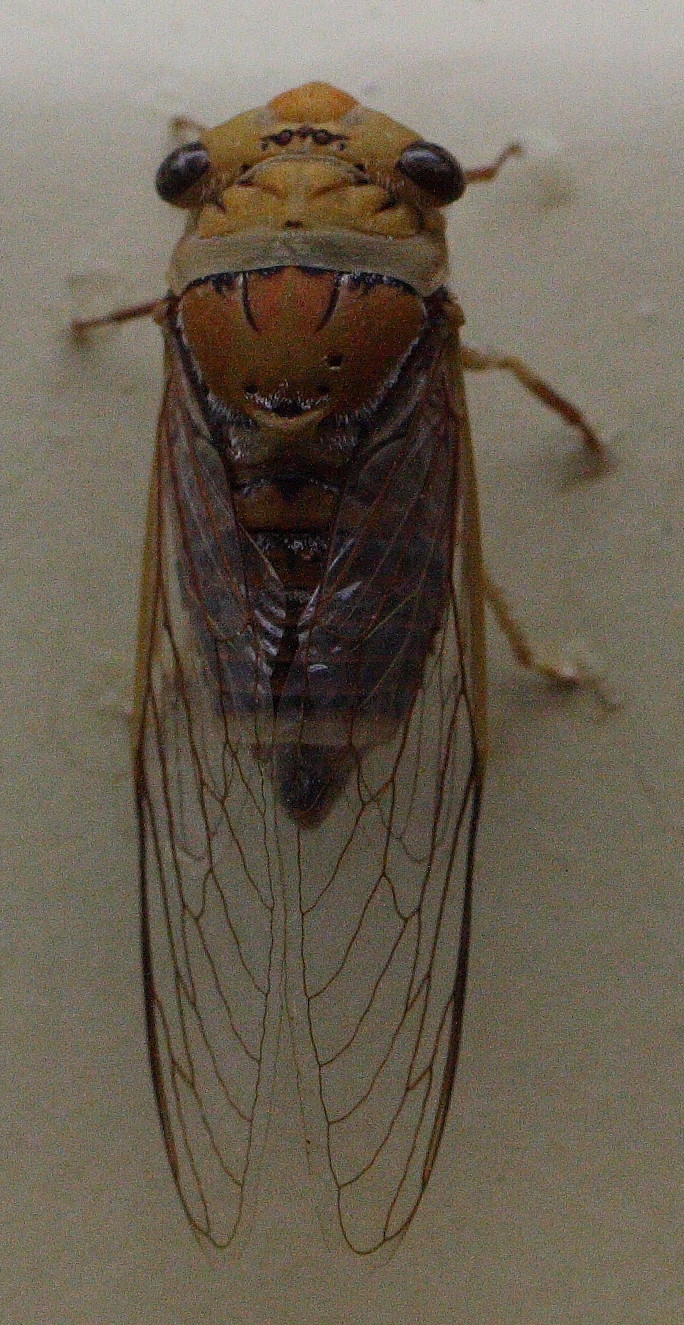
Macrotristria intersecta

== Genera ==
These following genera belong to the tribe Macrotristriini:

1. Illyria Moulds, 1985^{c g}
2. Macrotristria Stål, 1870^{c g}
3. Mouldspsaltria Sanborn, 2021 - monotypic M. madegassa

Data sources: i = ITIS, c = Catalogue of Life, g = GBIF, b = Bugguide.net
