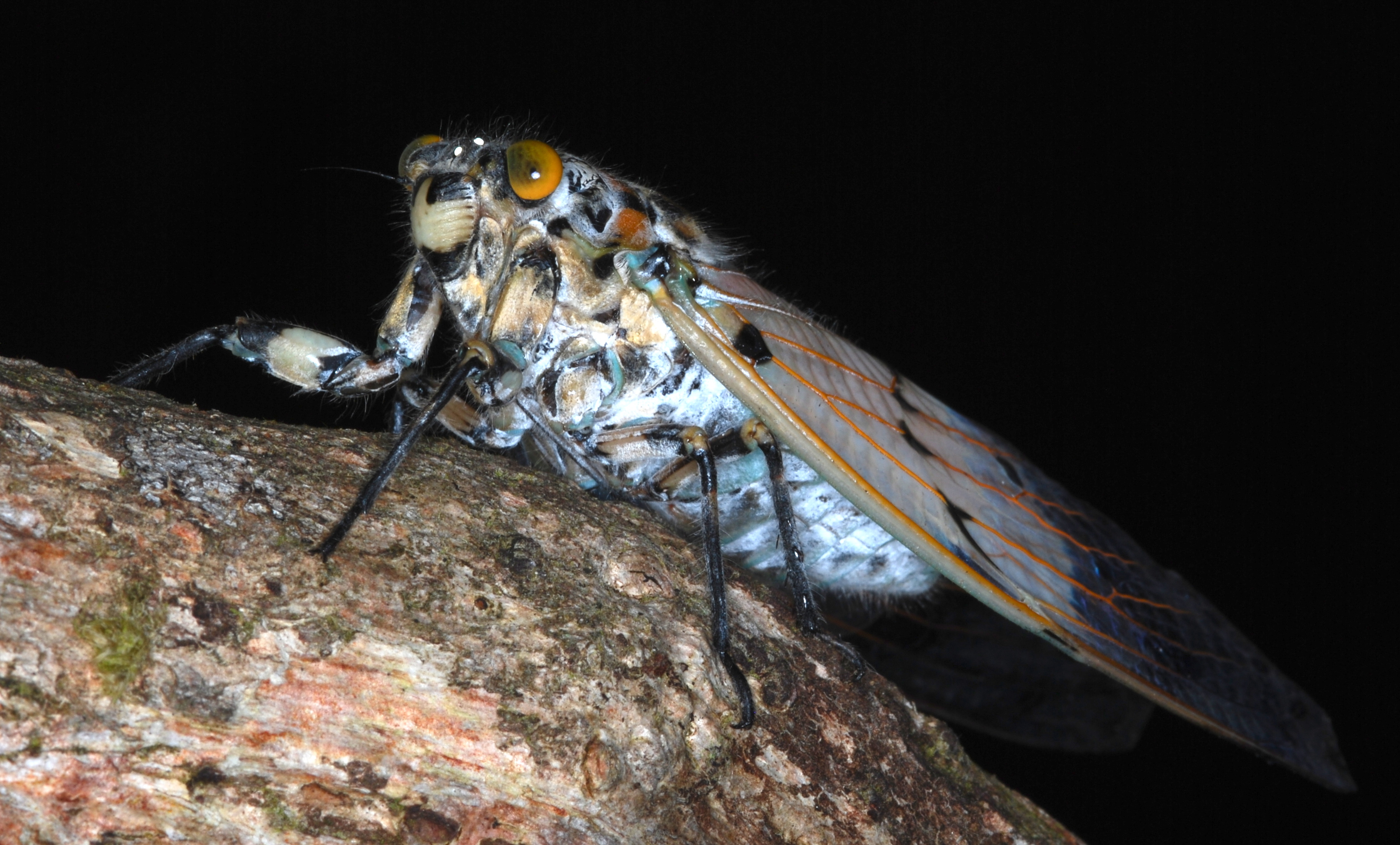
- Ayuthia spectabile

Scientific classification
- Kingdom: Animalia
- Phylum: Arthropoda
- Clade: Pancrustacea
- Class: Insecta
- Order: Hemiptera
- Suborder: Auchenorrhyncha
- Family: Cicadidae
- Subfamily: Cicadinae
- Tribe: Ayuthiini; Moulds, Lee & Marshall, 2021

= Ayuthiini =

Tribe of true bugs

The Ayuthiini are a tribe of Asian cicadas in the subfamily Cicadinae; species have been recorded from Bangladesh, southern China and Indochina. Before taxonomic revision, genera were placed previously in the Tosenini.

== Genera ==
The following monotypic genera have now been placed in the tribe Ayuthiini:

1. Ayuthia Distant, 1919
2. Distantalna Boulard, 2009
