= Diceropyga =

Scientific classification
- Kingdom: Animalia
- Phylum: Arthropoda
- Clade: Pancrustacea
- Class: Insecta
- Order: Hemiptera
- Suborder: Auchenorrhyncha
- Infraorder: Cicadomorpha
- Superfamily: Cicadoidea
- Family: Cicadidae
- Subfamily: Cicadinae
- Genus: Diceropyga; Stål, 1870

Genus of cicadas

Diceropyga is a genus of cicadas, commonly known as dicers, in the family Cicadidae, found mainly in Australasia. It was described in 1870 by Swedish entomologist Carl Stål.

== Species ==
There are 26 species in the genus:

- Diceropyga auriculata Duffels, 1977
- Diceropyga aurita Duffels, 1977
- Diceropyga bacanensis Duffels, 1988
- Diceropyga bicornis Duffels, 1977
- Diceropyga bihamata Duffels, 1977
- Diceropyga bougainvillensis Duffels, 1977
- Diceropyga didyma (Boisduval, 1835)
- Diceropyga duffelsi Sanborn, 2015
- Diceropyga gravesteini Duffels, 1977
- Diceropyga guadalcanalensis Duffels, 1977
- Diceropyga junctivitta (Walker, 1868)
- Diceropyga major Duffels, 1977
- Diceropyga malaitensis Duffels, 1977
- Diceropyga noonadani Duffels, 1977
- Diceropyga novaebritannicae Duffels, 1977
- Diceropyga novaeguinae Distant, 1912
- Diceropyga obliterans Duffels, 1977
- Diceropyga obtecta (Fabricius, 1803)
- Diceropyga ochrothorax Duffels, 1977
- Diceropyga pigafettae (Distant, 1888)
- Diceropyga rennellensis Duffels, 1977
- Diceropyga subapicalis (Walker, 1868)
- Diceropyga subjuga Duffels, 1977
- Diceropyga tortifer Duffels, 1977
- Diceropyga triangulata Duffels, 1977
- Diceropyga woodlarkensis Duffels, 1977
