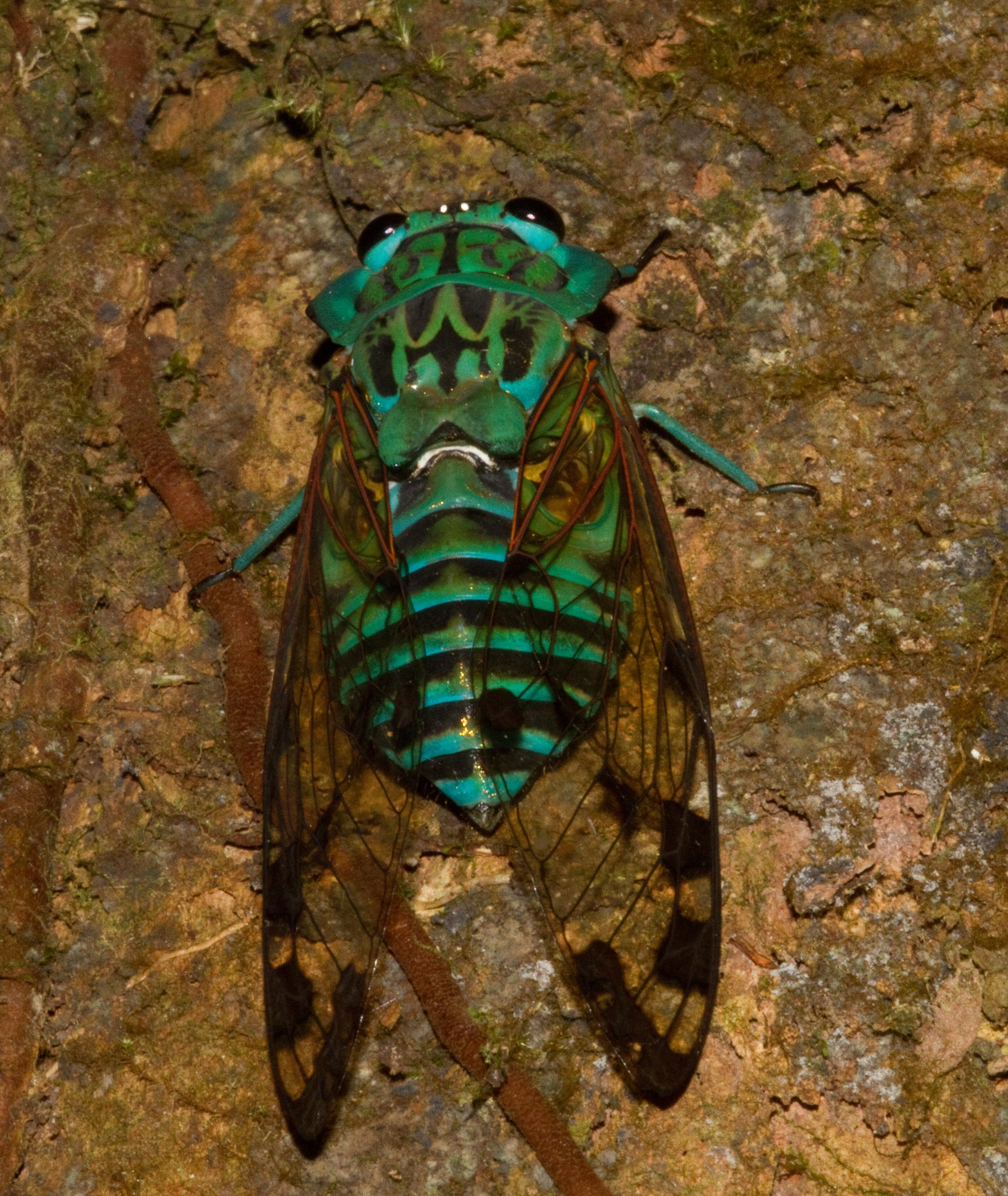
- Zammara sp.

Scientific classification
- Kingdom: Animalia
- Phylum: Arthropoda
- Clade: Pancrustacea
- Class: Insecta
- Order: Hemiptera
- Suborder: Auchenorrhyncha
- Superfamily: Cicadoidea
- Family: Cicadidae
- Subfamily: Cicadinae
- Tribe: Zammarini; Distant, 1905

= Zammarini =

Tribe of true bugs

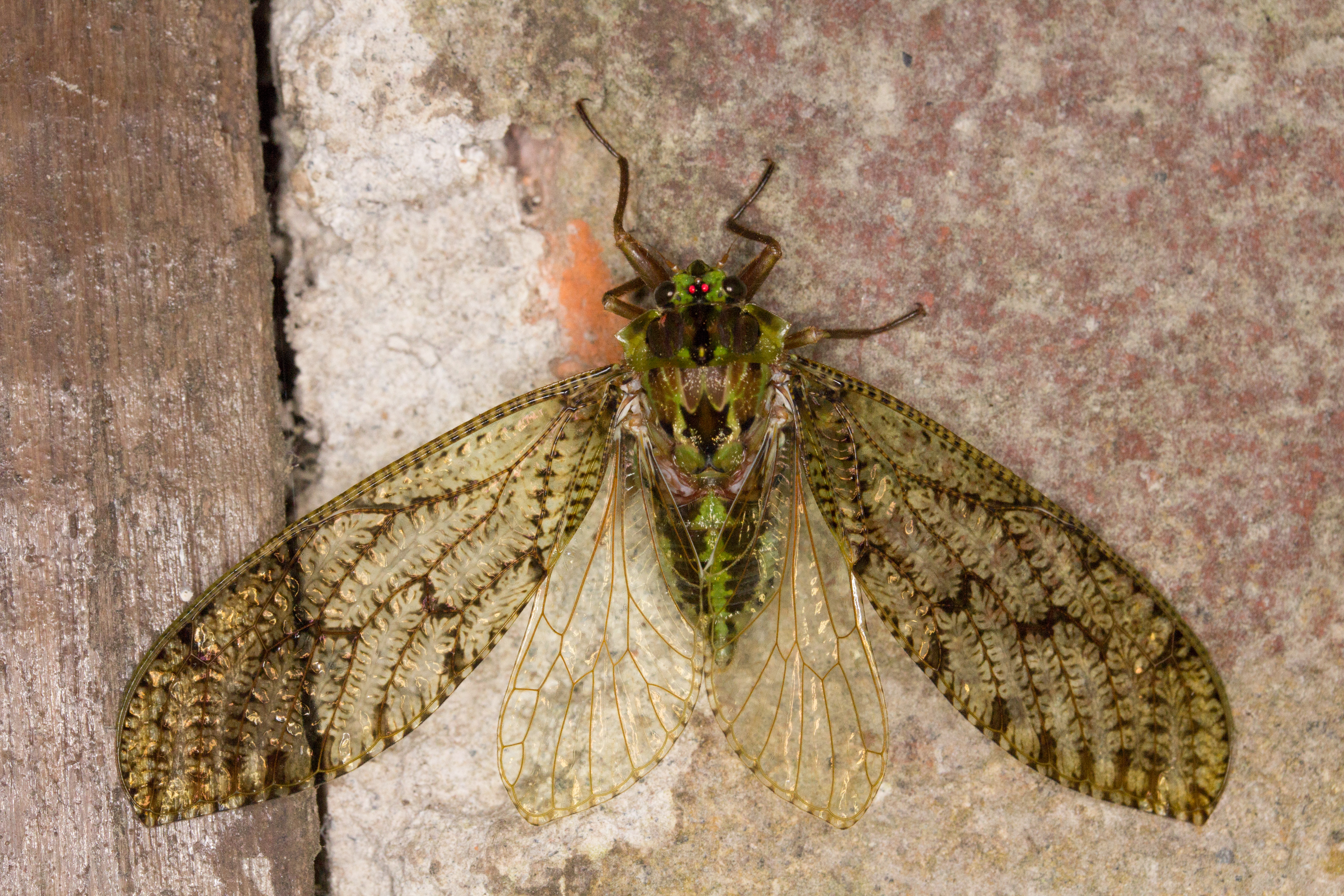
Onoralna falcata

The Zammarini is a tribe of cicadas. They are native to the Americas, and found especially in the tropical and subtropical regions of the Neotropical realm. The tribe can be identified by their wide pronotum.

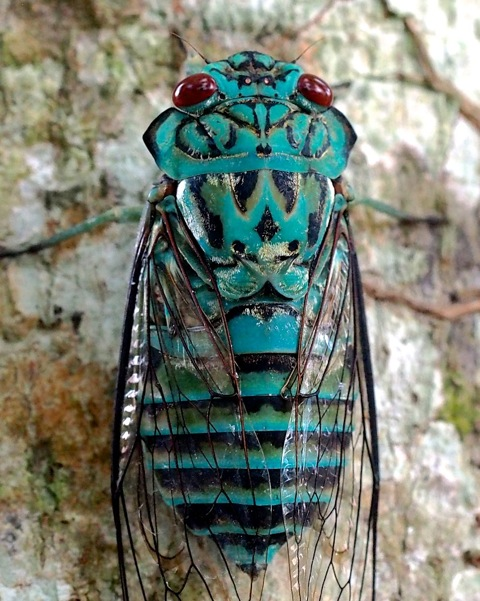
Zammara smaragdula

== Genera ==
The World Auchenorrhyncha Database currently (April 2026) lists 21 genera in three subtribes, including:

- Borencona Davis, 1928
- Chinaria Davis, 1934
- Daza Distant, 1905
- Juanaria Distant, 1920
- Miranha Distant, 1905
- Odopoea Stål, 1861
- Onoralna Boulard, 1996
- Orellana Distant, 1905
- Pachypsaltria Stål, 1861
- Procollina Metcalf, 1952
- Uhleroides Distant, 1912
- Zammara Amyot & Audinet-Serville, 1843
- Zammaralna Boulard & Sueur, 1996
