= Zamperini =

Zamperini is an Italian surname that may refer to:

- Alessandro Zamperini (born 1982), Italian football player
- Louis Zamperini (1917–2014), American Olympic distance runner, US Air Forces Captain and inspirational speaker
  - Zamperini Field, an airport in California, U.S., named after Louis
