= Cicadinae =

- Cicada orni imago (Cicadini)

Scientific classification
- Kingdom: Animalia
- Phylum: Arthropoda
- Clade: Pancrustacea
- Class: Insecta
- Order: Hemiptera
- Suborder: Auchenorrhyncha
- Family: Cicadidae
- Subfamily: Cicadinae; Batsch, 1789

Subfamily of true bugs

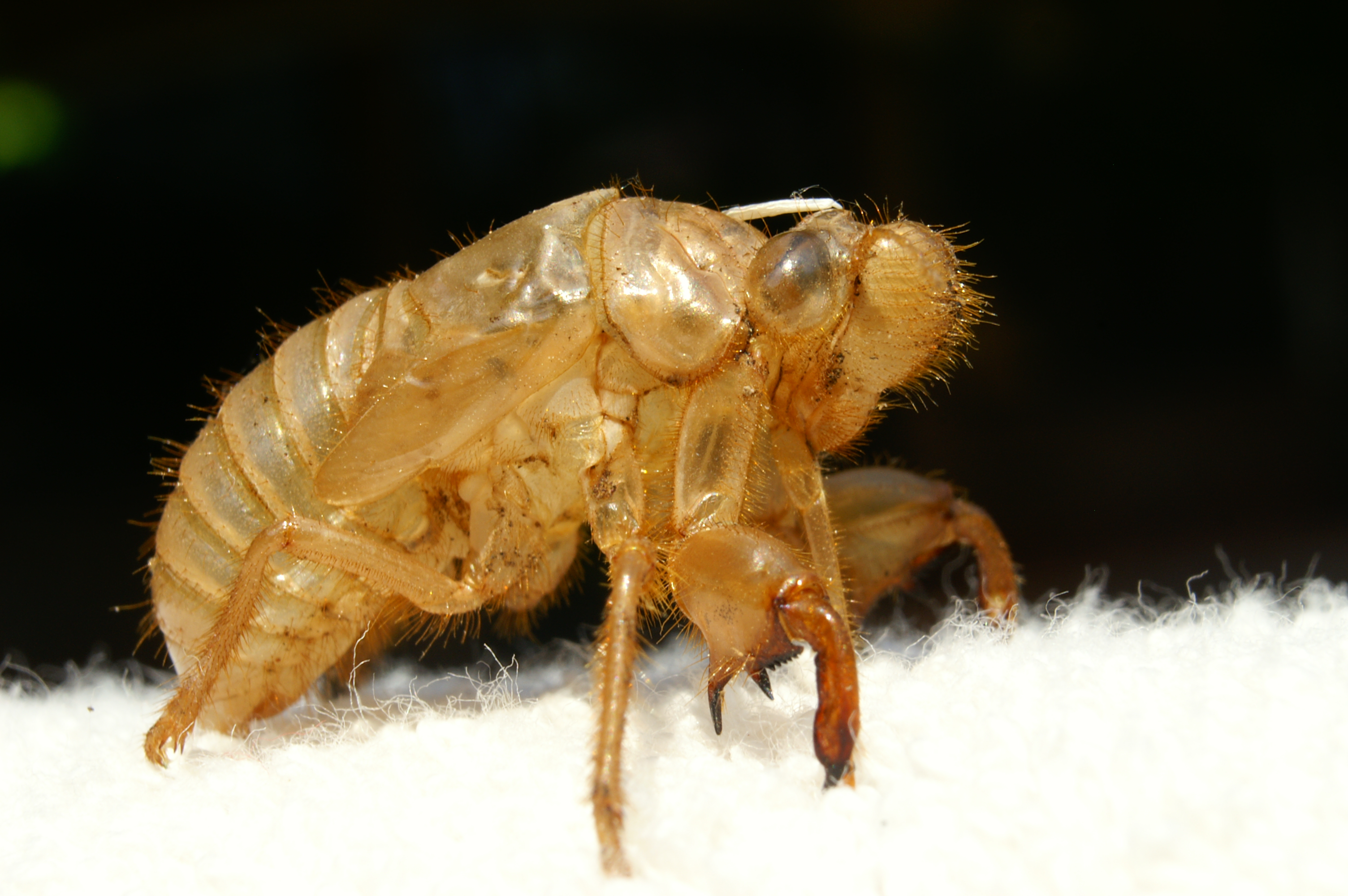
Exuviae of Tibicen plebejus nymph (Cryptotympanini)

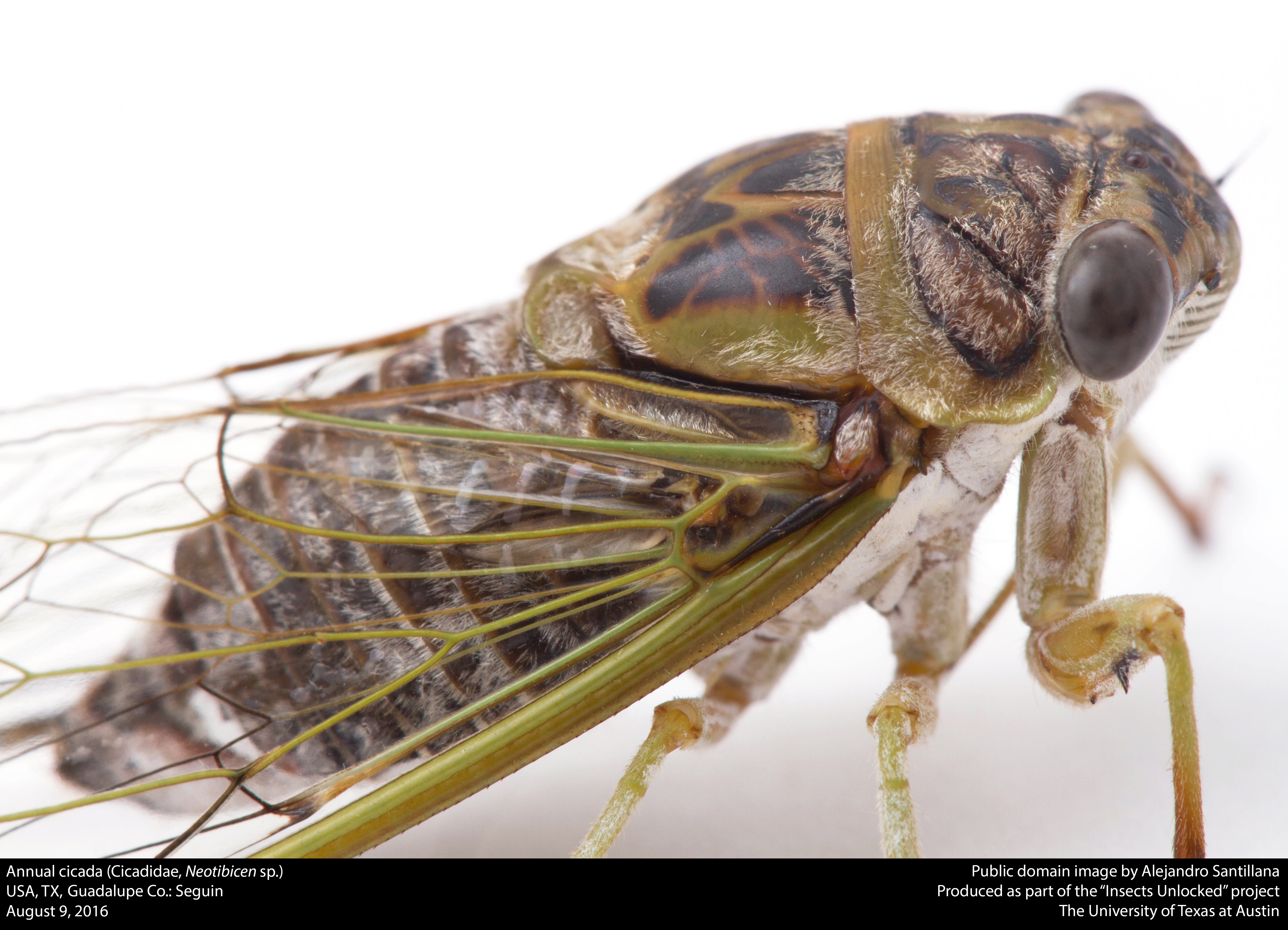
Annual Cicada, Neotibicen

The Cicadinae are a subfamily of cicadas, containing the translucent cicadas. They are robust cicadas and many have gaudy colors, but they generally lack the butterfly-like opaque wing markings found in many species of the related Tibiceninae.

== Systematics ==
This large subfamily is here divided into tribes. Other schemes exist, which usually have a coarser subdivision. Some, however, merge the Tibiceninae here whole or partly. The genera given below were substantially revised 2010 through 2018 due to additional morphological and molecular phylogenetic analysis.

The following tribes belong to the subfamily Cicadinae:

1. Antankariini Sanborn, 2021 genera:
  1. Antankaria Distant, 1904
  2. Orientafroinsularis Sanborn, 2021
2. Arenopsaltriini Moulds, 2018
3. Ayuthiini Moulds, Lee & Marshall, 2021
4. Burbungini Moulds, 2005
5. Cicadatrini Distant, 1905
6. Cicadini Batsch, 1789
7. Cicadmalleuini Boulard & Puissant, 2013
8. Cosmopsaltriini Kato, 1932
9. Cyclochilini Distant, 1904
10. Distantadini Orian, 1963
11. Dundubiini Atkinson, 1886
12. Durangonini Moulds & Marshall, 2018
13. Fidicinini Distant, 1905
14. Gaeanini Distant 1905
15. Jassopsaltriini Moulds, 2005
16. Lahugadini Distant 1905
17. Leptopsaltriini Moulton, J.C., 1923
18. Macrotristriini Moulds, 2018
19. Oncotympanini Ishihara, 1961
20. Platypleurini Schmidt, 1918
  (synonym Orapini Boulard, 1985)
21. Polyneurini Amyot & Audinet-Serville, 1843
22. Pomponiini Kato, 1932 - monogeneric
  1. Pomponia Stål, 1866
23. Psaltodini Moulds, 2018
24. Sonatini Lee 2010 - monogeneric
  1. genus Hyalessa China, 1925
25. Tacuini Distant, 1904 (includes Cryptotympanini Handlirsch, 1925: now subtribe Tacuina Distant, 1904 due to date priority.)
26. Talcopsaltriini Moulds, 2008
27. Tamasini Moulds, 2005
28. Thophini Distant, 1904
29. Tosenini Amyot & Serville, 1843
30. Zammarini Distant, 1905 - includes Plautillini Distant, 1905

The names Platypleurini Schmidt, 1918 and Hamzini Distant 1905 refer to the same tribe. The question of name priority was submitted to the ICZN for resolution in 2018 (case 3761). The tribe Oncotympanini was reduced to subtribe level and transferred to Cicadini in 2010, but was later returned to tribe status.

Some notable genera include:

- Tribe Ayuthiini
  - Ayuthia Distant, 1919 (monotypic)
  - Distantalna Boulard, 2009 (monotypic)
- Tribe Cicadini
  - Cicada
  - Euterpnosia
  - Illyria
  - Leptosemia
  - Neocicada
  - Terpnosia
- Tribe Cicadatrini
  - Mogannia
- Tribe Cryptotympanini
  - Antankaria
  - Auritibicen
  - Chremistica
  - Cryptotympana
  - Hadoa
  - Heteropsaltria
  - Neotibicen
  - Nggeliana
  - Raiateana
  - Salvazana
  - Tacua
- Tribe Cyclochilini
  - Cyclochila
- Tribe Dundubiini
  - Aceropyga
  - Calcagninus
  - Cosmopsaltria
  - Diceropyga
  - Dundubia
  - Macrosemia
  - Maua
  - Megapomponia
  - Meimuna
  - Nabalua
  - Orientopsaltria
  - Platylomia
  - Purana
  - Tanna
- Tribe Fidicinini
  - Diceroprocta
  - Hyantia
  - Mura
  - Quesada
- Tribe Macrotristriini
  - Macrotristria
- Tribe Oncotympanini
  - Oncotympana
- Tribe Platypleurini
  - Platypleura
  - Pycna
  - Ugada
- Tribe Psaltodini
  - Psaltoda
- Psithyristriini Distant, 1905
  - Pomponia
- Tribe Thophini
  - Thopha
  - Arunta

== See also ==
- List of Cicadinae genera
