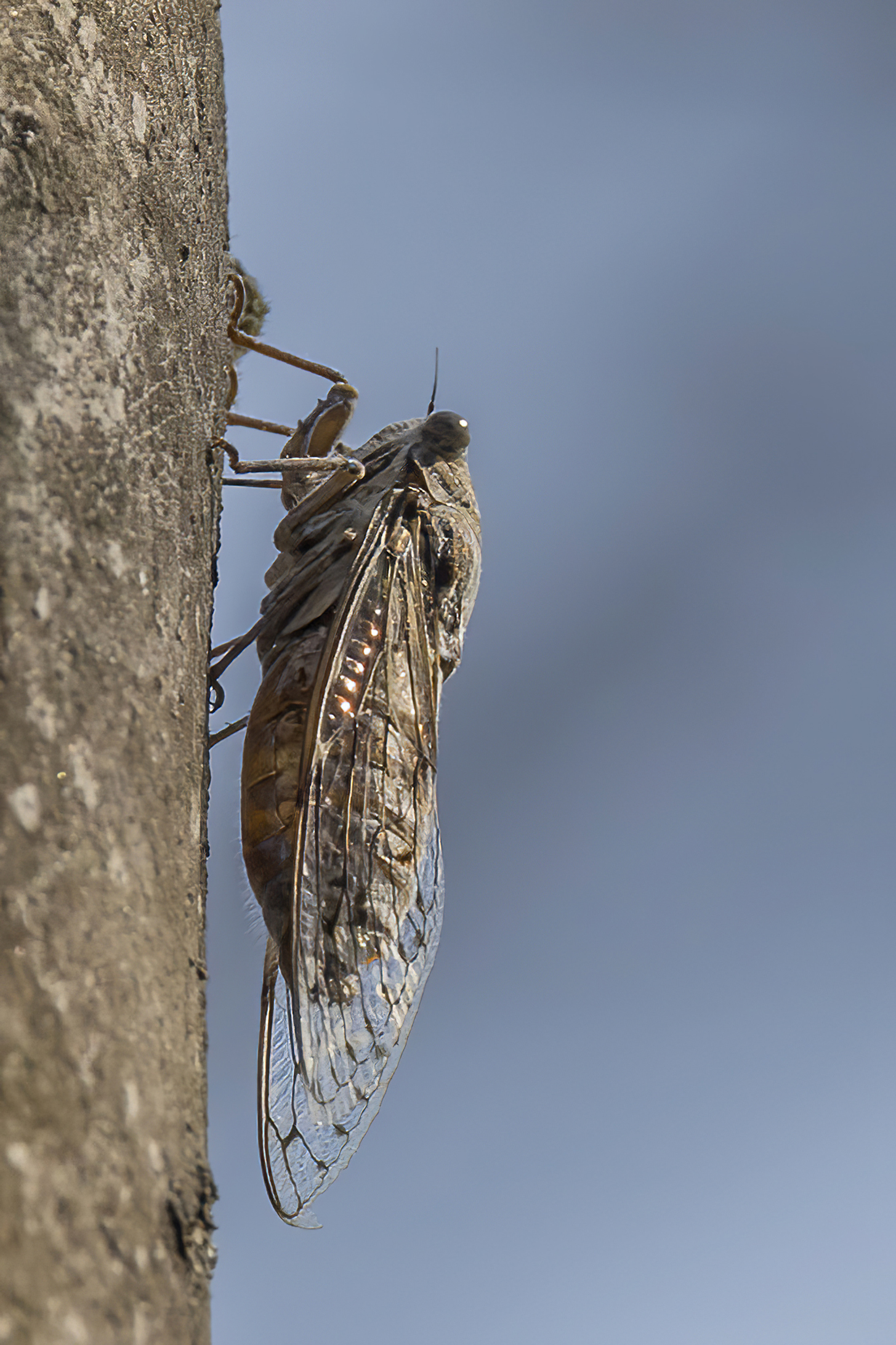
- Cicada orni male

Scientific classification
- Kingdom: Animalia
- Phylum: Arthropoda
- Clade: Pancrustacea
- Class: Insecta
- Order: Hemiptera
- Suborder: Auchenorrhyncha
- Superfamily: Cicadoidea
- Family: Cicadidae; Batsch, 1789

Subfamilies
- See text

= Cicadidae =

Cicadidae Temporal range: Paleocene–Present

Family of cicada insects

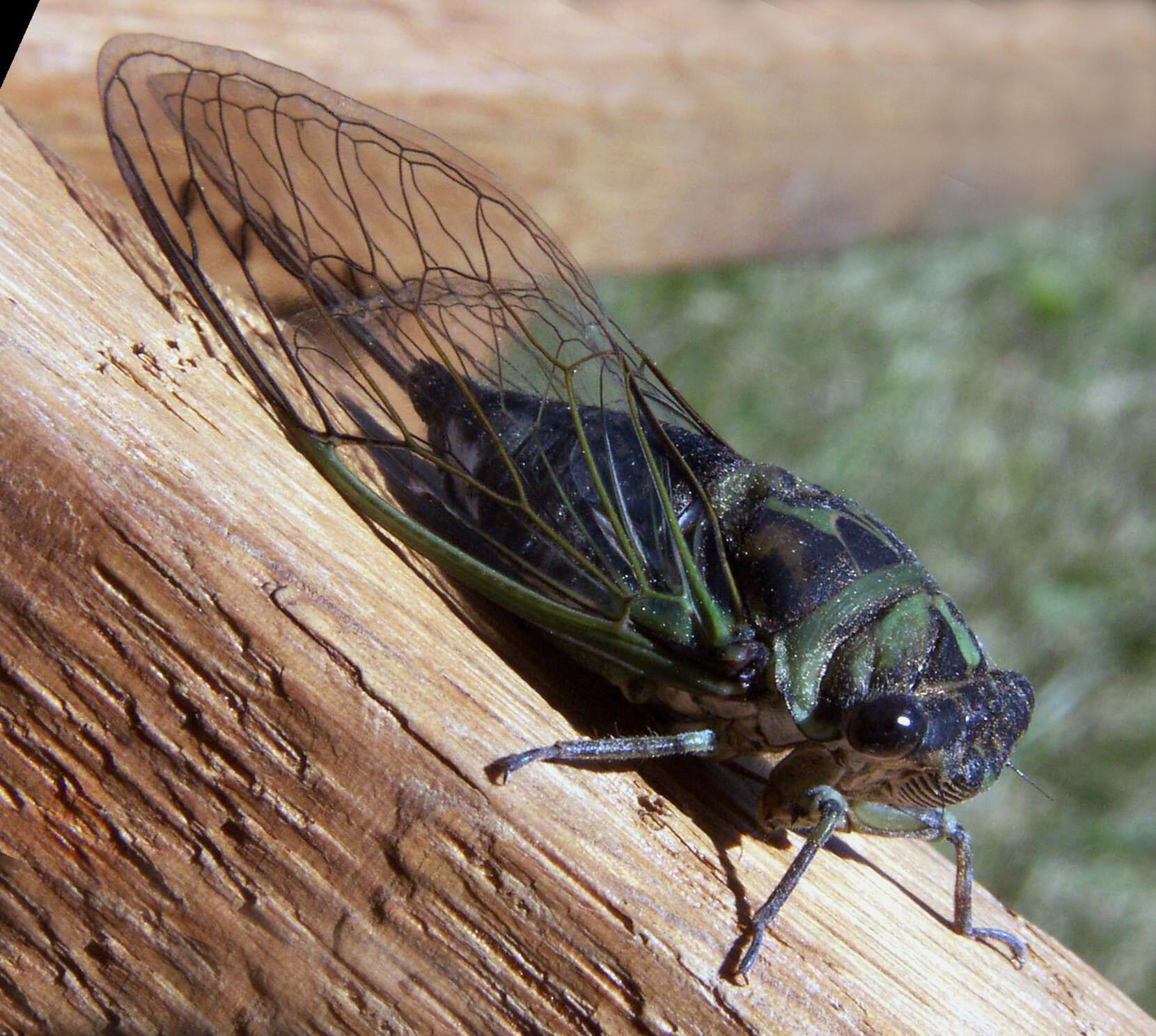
Neotibicen linnei

Cicadidae, the true cicadas, is one of two families of cicadas, with about 3,400 species in over 520 genera worldwide; it contains most living cicada species, except for the two belonging to its sister taxon, the Tettigarctidae. The classification of this family, of often very similar insects, has undergone many revisions, continuing into the 21st century; for example, many species previously assigned to the type genus Cicada, are now placed in different tribes.

== Description ==
Cicadas are mostly large insects characterized by their membranous wings, triangular-formation of three ocelli on the top of their heads, their short, bristle-like antennae and often producing high-pitched songs. Although other Auchenorrhynchan insects communicate with sounds, the tymbals (modified membranes located on the abdomen) and resonating chambers, sometimes covered by opercula, are especially efficient mechanisms in the Cicadidae (and may include diagnostic features for identification).

=== Communication ===
Cicadas are known for the loud airborne sounds that males of most species make to attract mates. One member of this family, Brevisana brevis, the "shrill thorntree cicada", is the loudest insect in the world, able to produce a song that exceeds 100 decibels. Male cicadas can produce four types of acoustic signals: songs, calls, low-amplitude songs, and disturbance sounds. Unlike members of the order Orthoptera (grasshoppers, crickets, etc.), which use stridulation to produce sounds, members of Cicadidae produce sounds using a pair of tymbals. In order to produce sound, each tymbal is pulled inwards by a connected muscle, and the deformation of the stiff membrane produces a 'click.'

== Life cycle ==
Cicadas can be separated into two categories based on their adult emergence pattern. Annual cicadas remain underground as nymphs for two or more years and the population is not locally synchronized in its development, so that some adults mature each year or in most years. Periodical cicadas also have multiple-year life cycles but emerge in synchrony or near synchrony in any one location and are absent as adults in the intervening years; this is thought to be a defence strategy against predation. The best-known periodical cicadas, genus Magicicada, emerge as adults every 13 or 17 years.

Newly emerged cicadas climb up trees and molt into their adult stage, now equipped with wings. Males call to attract females, producing the distinct noisy songs cicadas are known for. Females respond to males with a 'click' made by flicking their wings. Once a male has found a female partner, his call changes to indicate that they are a mating pair.

== Classification ==
Cicadidae is one of two families within the superfamily Cicadoidea. This superfamily is in the suborder Auchenorrhyncha, containing cicadas, hoppers, and relatives, within the order Hemiptera, the true bugs. There are five subfamilies within Cicadidae: Cicadettinae, Cicadinae, Derotettiginae, Tettigomyiinae and Tibicininae.

Subfamily Cicadettinae Buckton, 1890

- Tribe Aragualnini Sanborn, 2018
- Tribe Carinetini Distant, 1905
- Tribe Chlorocystini Distant, 1905
- Tribe Cicadatrini Distant, 1905
- Tribe Cicadettini Buckton, 1890
- Tribe Katoini Moulds & Marshall, 2018
- Tribe Lamotialnini Boulard, 1976
- Tribe Nelcyndanini Moulds & Marshall, 2018
- Tribe Pagiphorini Moulds & Marshall, 2018
- Tribe Parnisini Distant, 1905
- Tribe Pictilini Moulds & Hill, 2018
- Tribe Prasiini Matsumura, 1917
- Tribe Taphurini Distant, 1905

Subfamily Cicadinae Batsch, 1789

- Tribe Antankariini Sanborn, 2021
- Tribe Arenopsaltriini Moulds, 2018
- Tribe Ayuthiini Moulds, Lee, and Marshall, 2021
- Tribe Burbungini Moulds, 2005
- Tribe Cicadini Batsch, 1789
- Tribe Cicadmalleuini Boulard & Puissant, 2013
- Tribe Cosmopsaltriini Kato, 1932
- Tribe Cyclochilini Distant, 1904
- Tribe Distantadini Orian, 1963
- Tribe Dundubiini Distant, 1905 (Note: Sinosenini Boulard, 1975, is now recognized as a subjective junior synonym of subtribe Dundubiina Distant, 1905.)
- Tribe Durangonini Moulds & Marshall, 2018
- Tribe Fidicinini Distant, 1905
- Tribe Gaeanini Distant, 1905
- Tribe Jassopsaltriini Moulds, 2005
- Tribe Kimberpsaltriini Moulds, Marshall, and Popple, 2021
- Tribe Lahugadini Distant, 1905
- Tribe Leptopsaltriini Moulton, 1923
- Tribe Macrotristriini Moulds, 2018
- Tribe Oncotympanini Ishihara, 1961
- Tribe Platypleurini Schmidt, 1918 (Note: Orapini Boulard, 1985, is now recognized as a subjective junior synonym of Platypleurini Schmidt, 1918.)
- Tribe Plautillini Distant, 1905
- Tribe Polyneurini Amyot & Audinet-Serville, 1843
- Tribe Psaltodini Moulds, 2018
- Tribe Psithyristriini Distant, 1905
- Tribe Sonatini Lee, 2010
- Tribe Tacuini Distant, 1904 (tribe Cryptotympanini Handlirsch, 1925 is now subtribe Tacuina Distant, 1904) (Note: Synonomised by Marshall et al. (2018 p. 38). Tacuini has date priority.)
- Tribe Talcopsaltriini Moulds, 2008
- Tribe Tamasini Moulds, 2005
- Tribe Thophini Distant, 1904
- Tribe Tosenini Amyot & Audinet-Serville, 1843
- Tribe Zammarini Distant, 1905

Subfamily Derotettiginae Moulds, 2019

- Tribe Derotettigini Moulds, 2019

Subfamily Tettigomyiinae Distant, 1905

- Tribe Hovanini Sanborn, Moulds & Marshall, 2020
- Tribe Iruanini Boulard, 1983 (Note: Lacetasini Moulds and Marshall, 2018, is now recognized as a subjective junior synonym of Iruanini Boulard, 1983.)
- Tribe Malagasiini Moulds & Marshall, 2018
- Tribe Tettigomyiini Distant, 1905
- Tribe Ydiellini Boulard, 1973

Subfamily Tibicininae Distant, 1905

- Tribe Citroriginini Sanborn, 2021
- Tribe Chilecicadini Sanborn, 2014
- Tribe Hemidictyini Distant, 1905
- Tribe Platypediini Kato, 1932
- Tribe Sapantangini Sanborn, Moulds, & Marshall, 2020
- Tribe Selymbriini Moulds & Marshall, 2018
- Tribe Tettigadini Distant, 1905
- Tribe Tibicinini Distant, 1905

=== Evolution ===
The earliest fossils of cicadas more closely related to Cicadidae than to Tettigarctidae date to the Jurassic period. The morphology of well preserved stem-cicadids from mid-Cretaceous Burmese amber from Myanmar suggests that unlike many modern cicadas, they were either silent or only made quiet sounds. The oldest modern cicadids date to the Paleocene. The earliest confirmed member of Cicadinae and one of the oldest Cicadids known from Eurasia is the fossil cicada Eoplatypleura, from the Eocene aged Messel Pit locality of Germany, which is a member of tribe Platypleurini.

== See also ==
- List of Cicadidae genera
