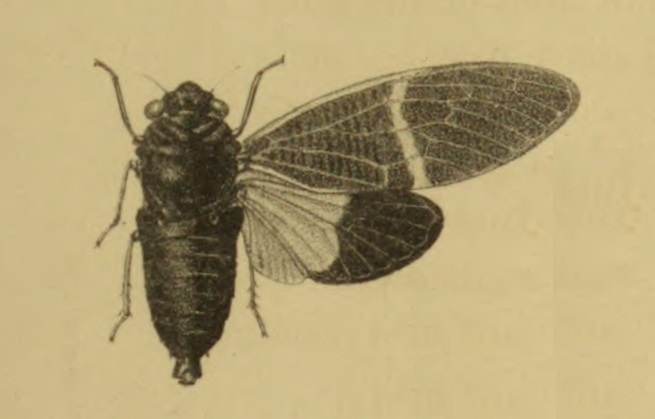
- Vittagaeana dives, male

Scientific classification
- Domain: Eukaryota
- Kingdom: Animalia
- Phylum: Arthropoda
- Class: Insecta
- Order: Hemiptera
- Suborder: Auchenorrhyncha
- Family: Cicadidae
- Subfamily: Cicadinae
- Tribe: Gaeanini
- Genus: Vittagaeana
- Species: V. dives

Binomial name
- Vittagaeana dives (Westwood, 1842)

Synonyms
- Cicada dives Westwood, 1842; Tosena dives (Westwood, 1842)

= Vittagaeana dives =

Species of true bug

Vittagaeana dives, previously placed in the genus Tosena, is a cicada species from Southeast Asia. The type was collected in Sylhet, Bangladesh. This species has also been recorded from Sikkim and Darjeeling in India.
