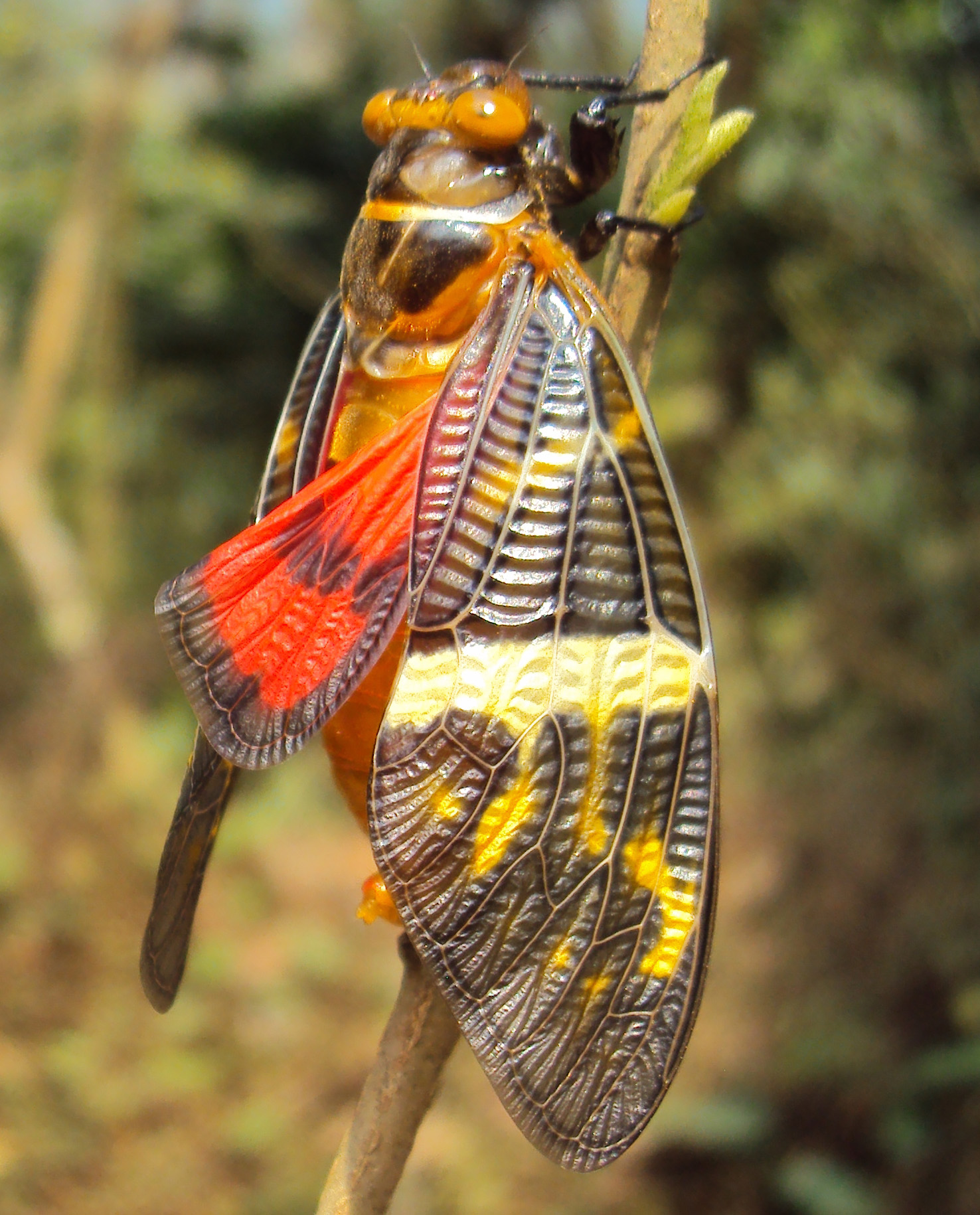

Scientific classification
- Kingdom: Animalia
- Phylum: Arthropoda
- Clade: Pancrustacea
- Class: Insecta
- Order: Hemiptera
- Suborder: Auchenorrhyncha
- Family: Cicadidae
- Subfamily: Cicadinae
- Tribe: Gaeanini
- Genus: Gaeana
- Species: G. atkinsoni

Binomial name
- Gaeana atkinsoni Distant, 1889

= Gaeana atkinsoni =

Species of true bug

Gaeana atkinsoni is a colourful cicada species and is the only member of the genus Gaeana that is found in southern India. Other species are found along the Himalayas and in Southeast Asia. It is endemic to the forests of the Western Ghats where it emerges in summer. Males are brightly coloured with a yellow and black forewing and a bright red hindwing that is visible in flight.

The species was described by William Lucas Distant in 1889 based on a specimen obtained from Karwar by E.T. Atkinson and named after the collector who was also accountant-general of Bengal and a president of the board of trustees of the Indian Museum at Calcutta. The colourful wing patterns are thought to mimic toxic moths and a possible model suggested is Pangora.

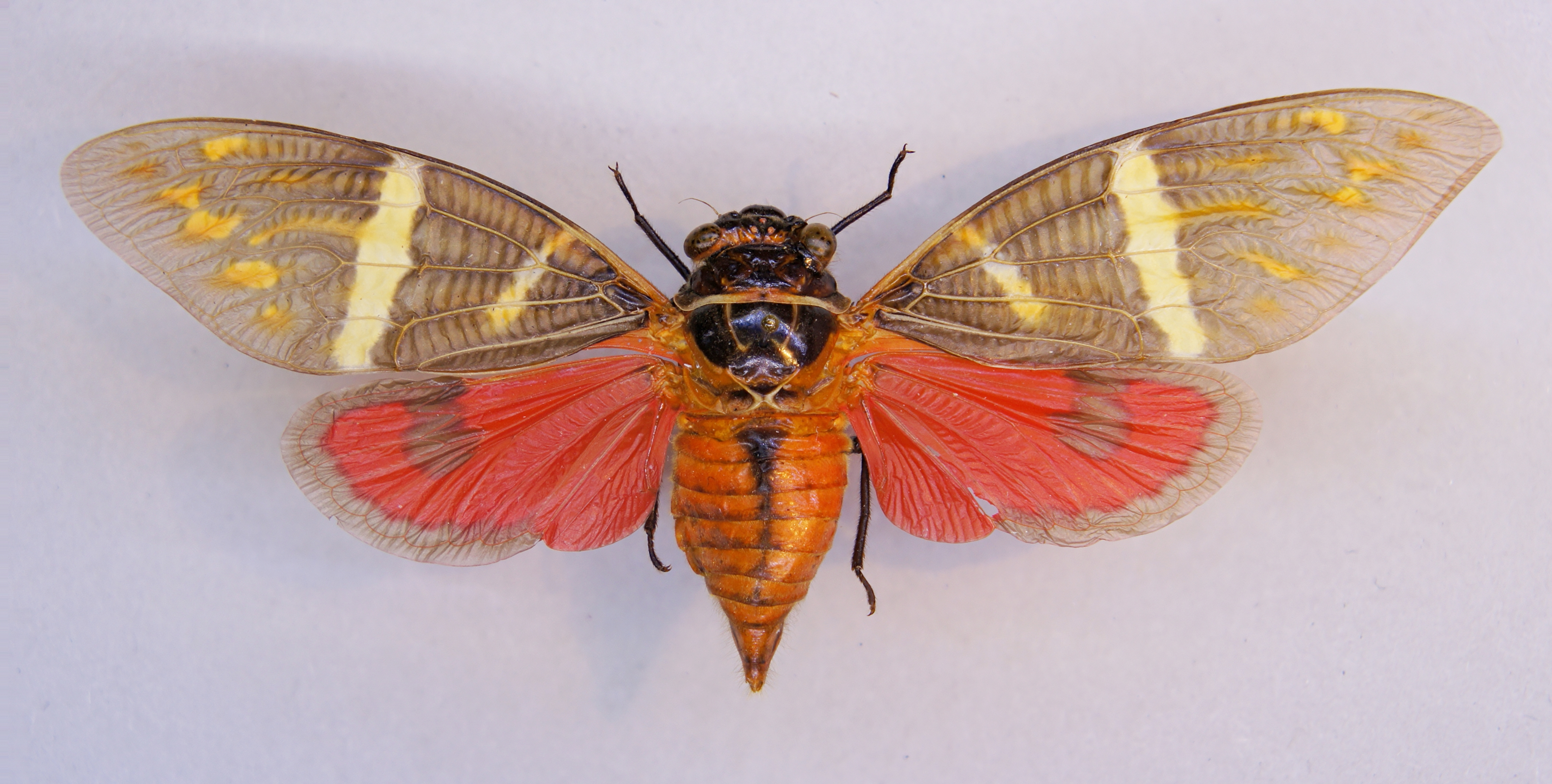
Specimen at Zoologische Staatssammlung München

Calling in summer
