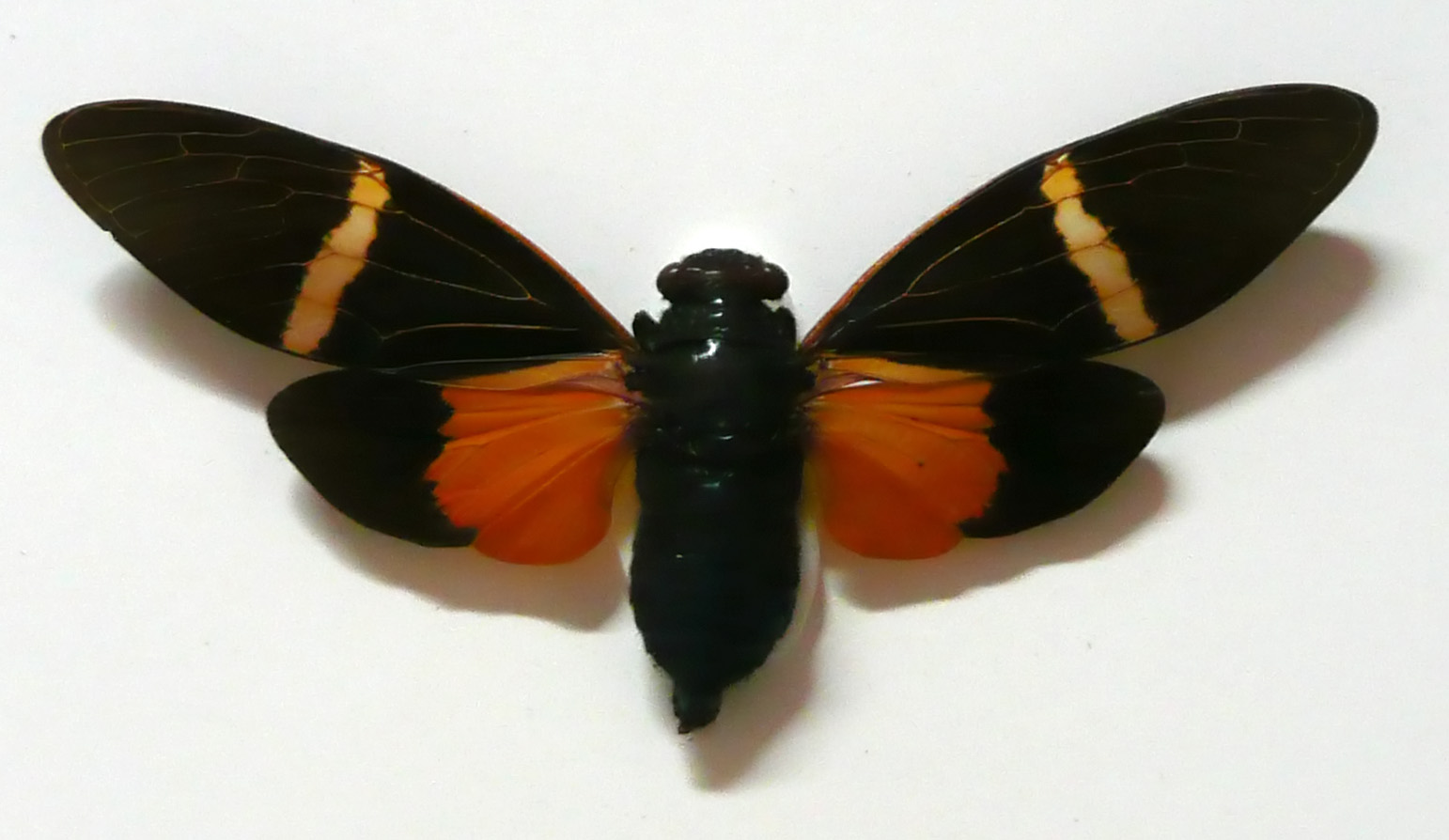
- Vittagaeana paviei specimen

Scientific classification
- Domain: Eukaryota
- Kingdom: Animalia
- Phylum: Arthropoda
- Class: Insecta
- Order: Hemiptera
- Suborder: Auchenorrhyncha
- Family: Cicadidae
- Subfamily: Cicadinae
- Tribe: Gaeanini
- Genus: Vittagaeana
- Species: V. paviei

Binomial name
- Vittagaeana paviei (Noualhier, 1896)

Synonyms
- Gaeana paviei Noualhier, 1896; Tosena paviei (Noualhier, 1896)

= Vittagaeana paviei =

Species of true bug

Vittagaeana paviei, previously placed in the genus Tosena, is a cicada species in the tribe Gaeanini from Indochina; it has been recorded from Thailand and Vietnam.

The type specimens(s) were collected on the "Route de Luang-Prabang à Theng". Luang Prabang is now in Laos but Theng probably refers to Điện Biên Phủ, a city in the Northwest region of Vietnam near the border with Laos which was formerly called Thaeng or Muong Thanh (Mường Thanh). So it's not clear if the type specimen(s) were collected in Laos or Vietnam.
