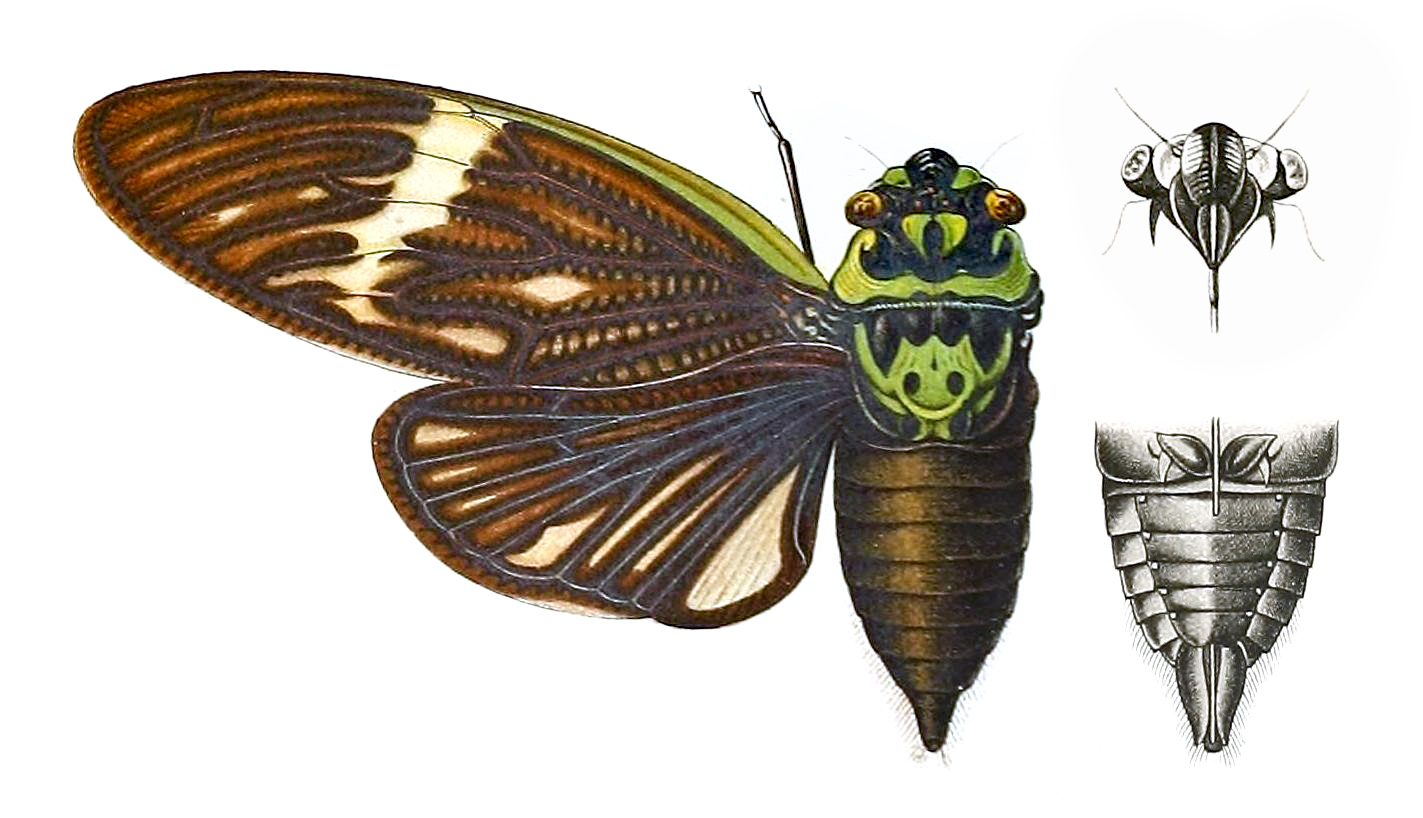
- Formotosena seebohmi, female

Scientific classification
- Kingdom: Animalia
- Phylum: Arthropoda
- Clade: Pancrustacea
- Class: Insecta
- Order: Hemiptera
- Suborder: Auchenorrhyncha
- Family: Cicadidae
- Subfamily: Cicadinae
- Tribe: Polyneurini
- Subtribe: Formotosenina
- Genus: Formotosena; Kato, 1925

Species
- See text

= Formotosena =

Genus of true bugs

Formotosena is a genus of cicadas from Southeast Asia erected by Kato in 1925 to accommodate the species Formotosena seebohmi which was previously placed in the genus Tosena. Members of Formotosena are found in Southeast Asia, including southern China, Hainan and Taiwan.

== List of species ==
Species accepted as of January 2025:

- Formotosena maculata Wang, Hayashi & Wei, 2024
- Formotosena montivaga (Distant, 1889)
- Formotosena pervalida Wang, Hayashi & Wei, 2024
- Formotosena seebohmi (Distant, 1904) - type species
- Formotosena sumboomi Boulard, 2013
