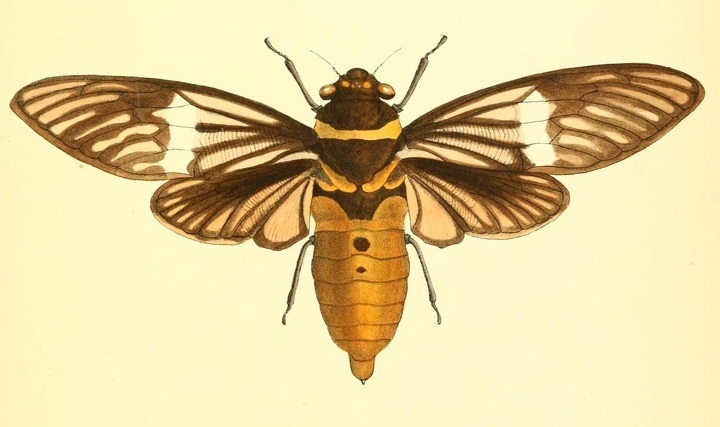
- Tosena albata, male

Scientific classification
- Kingdom: Animalia
- Phylum: Arthropoda
- Clade: Pancrustacea
- Class: Insecta
- Order: Hemiptera
- Suborder: Auchenorrhyncha
- Family: Cicadidae
- Genus: Tosena
- Species: T. albata

Binomial name
- Tosena albata Distant, 1878

= Tosena albata =

Species of true bug

Tosena albata is a cicada species from Southeast Asia. It was described by William Lucas Distant in 1878 who, however, subsequently regarded it as a variety of Tosena melanoptera. However, in 2000 Boulard confirmed the species status of Tosena albata by comparing its song with that of other Tosena species. T. albata has hitherto been recorded from Thailand, Nepal, North India, and Northwestern Himalaya
