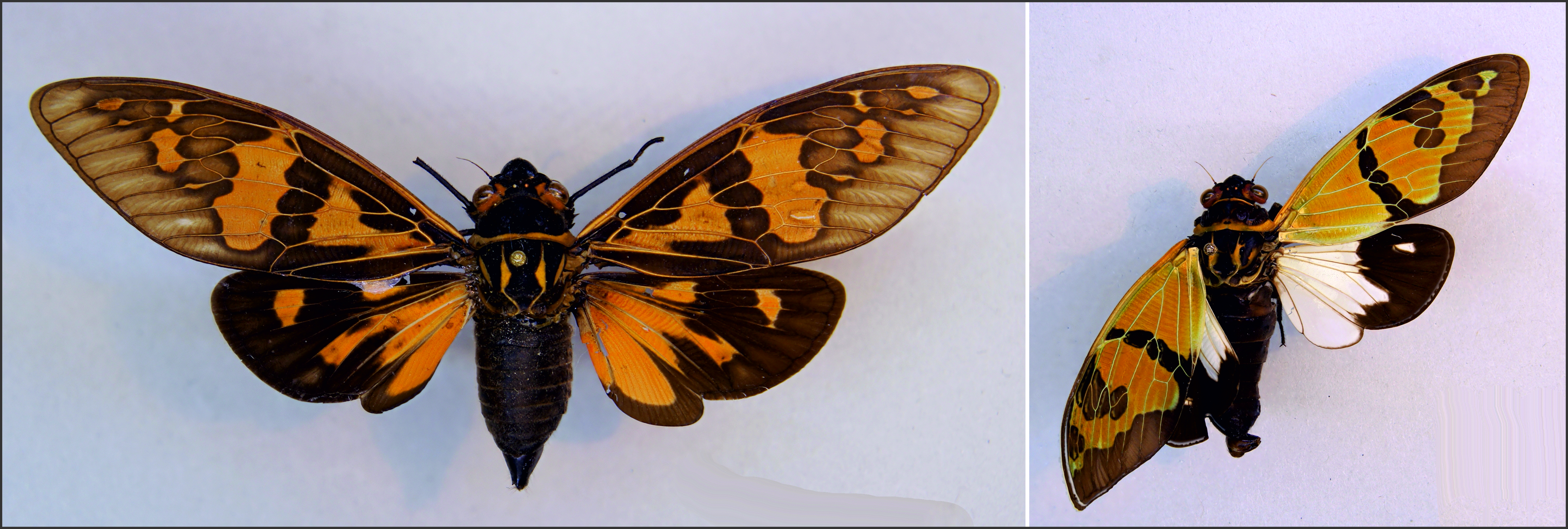
- Callogaeana festiva

Scientific classification
- Kingdom: Animalia
- Phylum: Arthropoda
- Class: Insecta
- Order: Hemiptera
- Suborder: Auchenorrhyncha
- Family: Cicadidae
- Subfamily: Cicadinae
- Tribe: Gaeanini
- Genus: Callogaeana; Chou & Yao, 1985

Synonyms
- Callagaeana Chou & Yao, 1985 (mis-spelling); Callagaena Sanborn, 2013 (mis-spelling)

= Callogaeana =

Genus of true bugs

Callogaeana is a genus of Asian cicadas in the tribe Gaeanini. This genus includes species that were previously placed in Gaeana and sometimes known as "butterfly cicadas" due to their colourful wings.

== Species ==
The Catalogue of Life lists seven recognized species:

- Callogaeana annamensis (Distant, 1913)
- Callogaeana aurantiaca Chou & Yao, 1985
- Callogaeana festiva (Fabricius, 1803) - synonym Gaeana festiva
- Callogaeana hageni (Distant, 1889)
- Callogaeana sultana (Distant, 1913)
- Callogaeana viridula Chou & Yao, 1985 – type species
- Callogaeana vitalisi (Distant, 1913)
