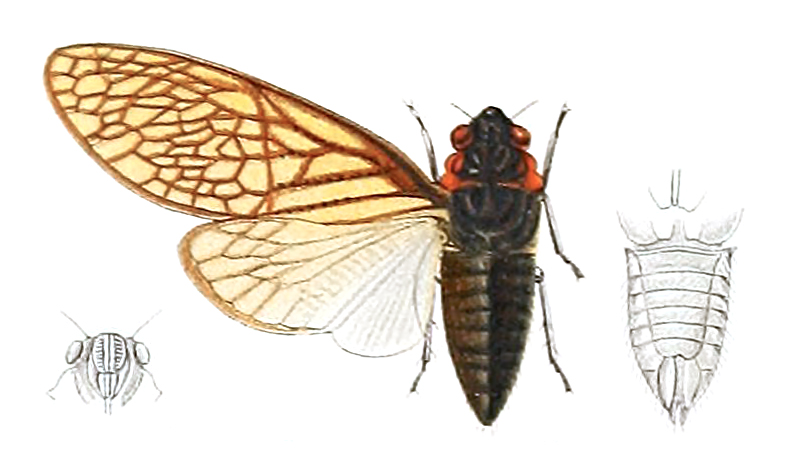
- Talainga binghami

Scientific classification
- Kingdom: Animalia
- Phylum: Arthropoda
- Clade: Pancrustacea
- Class: Insecta
- Order: Hemiptera
- Suborder: Auchenorrhyncha
- Family: Cicadidae
- Subfamily: Cicadinae
- Tribe: Gaeanini
- Genus: Talainga; Distant, 1890

Synonyms
- Talinga Distant, 1890

= Talainga =

Genus of true bugs

Talainga is a genus of Asian cicadas in the tribe Gaeanini, erected by William Lucas Distant in 1890. Species have been recorded from Bangladesh, China and Indochina.

== Species ==
The World Auchenorrhyncha Database (WAD) includes:

1. Talainga binghami Distant, 1890 type species (synonyms: T. chinensis Distant, 1900, T. omeishana Chen, 1957)
2. Talainga naga Ollenbach, 1928

Note: Talainga japrona Ollenbach, 1928 is now Paratalainga distanti (Jacobi, 1902)
