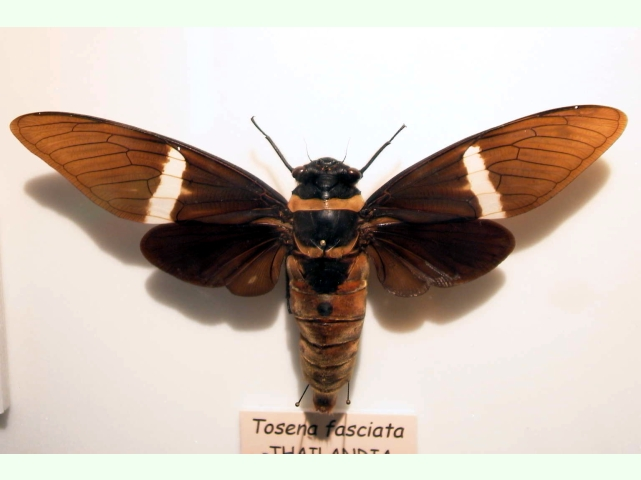
- Tosena fasciata

Scientific classification
- Kingdom: Animalia
- Phylum: Arthropoda
- Class: Insecta
- Order: Hemiptera
- Suborder: Auchenorrhyncha
- Superfamily: Cicadoidea
- Family: Cicadidae
- Subfamily: Cicadinae
- Tribe: Tosenini; Amyot & Audinet-Serville, 1843

= Tosenini =

Tribe of true bugs

Tosenini is a monogeneric tribe of cicadas in the subfamily Cicadinae. Species in Tosenini have been recorded from the Indomalayan realm, but genera in this "taxonomically unstable group of Asian cicada tribes" have been placed elsewhere.

== Genera ==
The tribe Tosenini contains only the genus Tosena Amyot & Audinet-Serville, 1843, which previously included species now placed in Vittagaeana.

Note: two monotypic genera previously placed here are now in the tribe Ayuthiini Moulds, Lee & Marshall, 2021.
