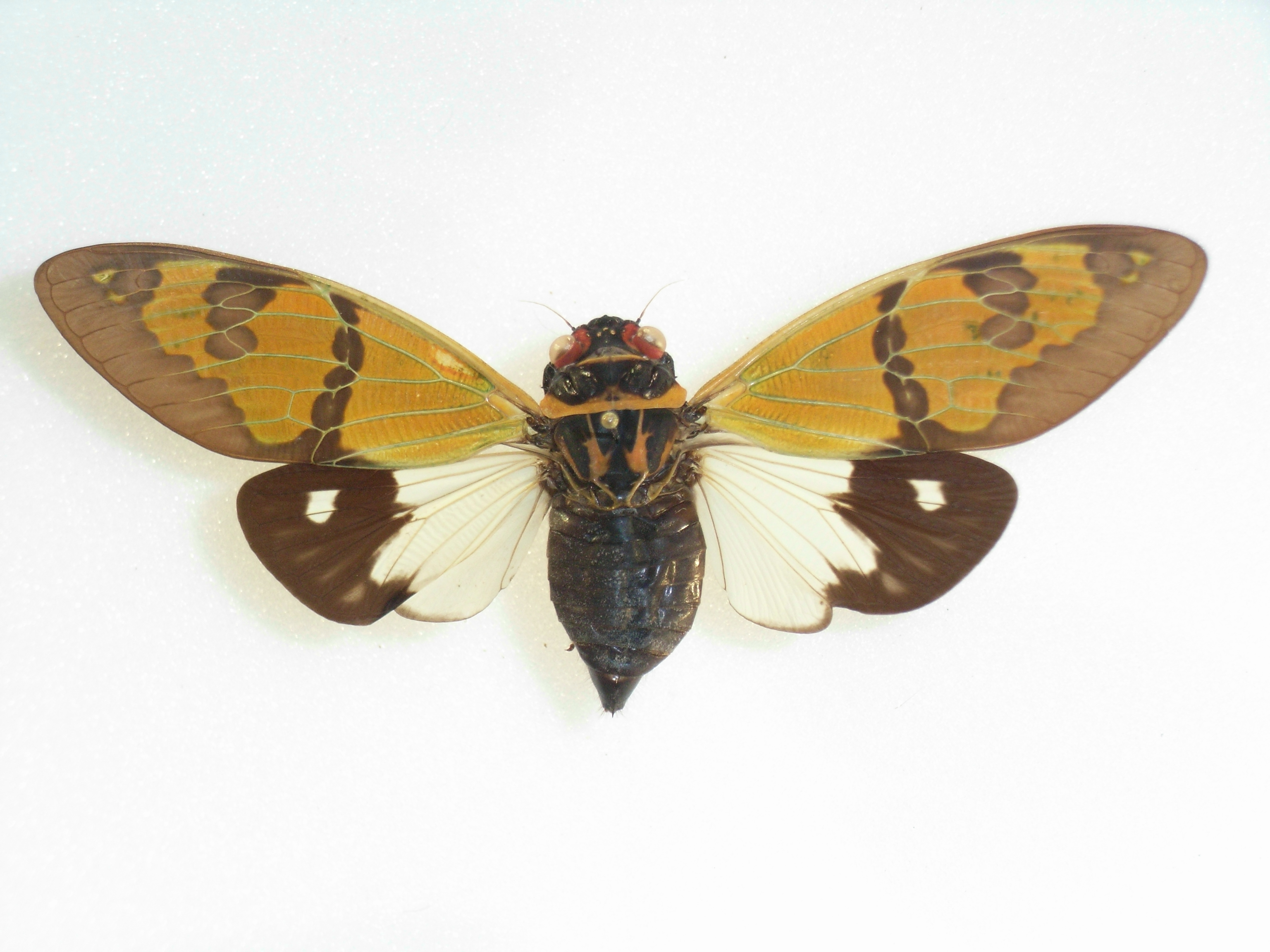
- White-winged form

Scientific classification
- Kingdom: Animalia
- Phylum: Arthropoda
- Class: Insecta
- Order: Hemiptera
- Suborder: Auchenorrhyncha
- Family: Cicadidae
- Subfamily: Cicadinae
- Tribe: Gaeanini
- Genus: Callogaeana
- Species: C. festiva

Binomial name
- Callogaeana festiva (Fabricius, 1803)

Synonyms
- Gaeana festiva (Fabricius, 1803); Gaeana festiva Stål, 1866; Cicada festiva Germar, 1830; Cicada percheronii Guerin-Meneville, 1844; Cicada thalassina Perchon, 1838; Gaeana consobrina F.Walker, 1850; Gaeana fastiva Mathur, 1953; Tettigonia festiua Fabricius, 1803; Tettigonia festiva Fabricius, 1803

= Callogaeana festiva =

Species of true bug

Callogaeana festiva is a species of cicada in the tribe Gaeanini. It is found in South and East Asia from India and Bhutan to China and Indonesia.

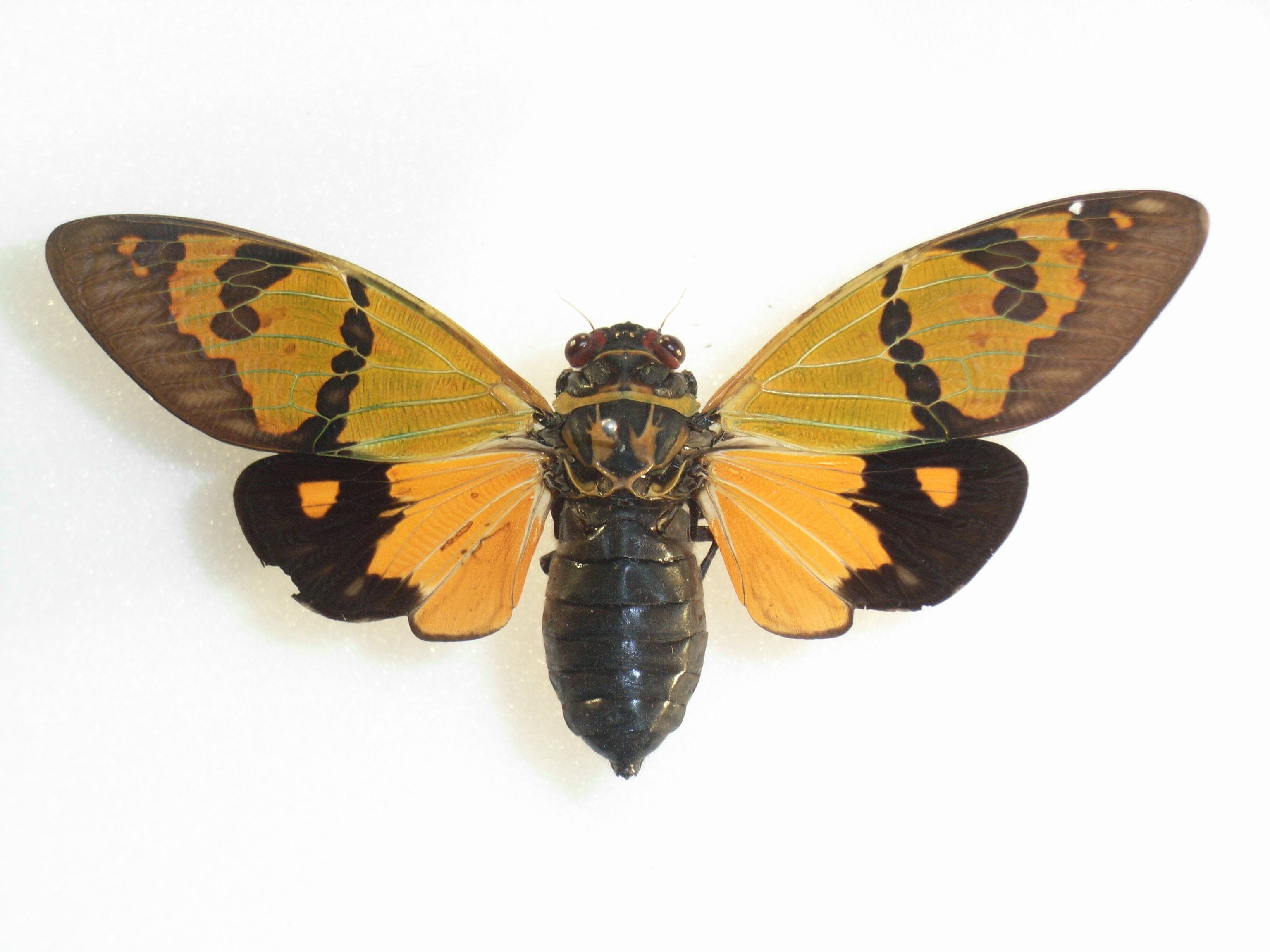
Dark-winged form
