= Becquartina =

Scientific classification
- Kingdom: Animalia
- Phylum: Arthropoda
- Clade: Pancrustacea
- Class: Insecta
- Order: Hemiptera
- Suborder: Auchenorrhyncha
- Family: Cicadidae
- Subfamily: Cicadinae
- Tribe: Gaeanini
- Genus: Becquartina; Kato, 1940

Synonyms
- Becquardina – Chou & Yao, 1985 (misspelling); Bequartina – Hua, 2000 (misspelling)

Genus of true bugs

Becquartina is a genus of Asian cicadas in the tribe Gaeanini and the monogeneric subtribe Becquartinina. This genus includes species that were previously placed in Gaeana and are sometimes known as "butterfly cicadas" due to their colourful wings.

== Species ==
The World Auchenorrhyncha Database includes:

- Becquartina bicolor Sarkar, Thangkhiew, Mahapatra, Mohapatra, Nair & Hajong, 2024
- Becquartina bleuzeni Boulard, 2005
- Becquartina electa (Jacobi, 1902) – type species (as Gaeana decorata Kato) (Note: Synonyms: B. bifasciata, Sinopsaltria bifasciata, B. decorata, Gaeana electra [sic] (Jacobi, 1902))
- Becquartina ruiliensis Chou & Yao, 1985
- Becquartina versicolor Boulard, 2005
