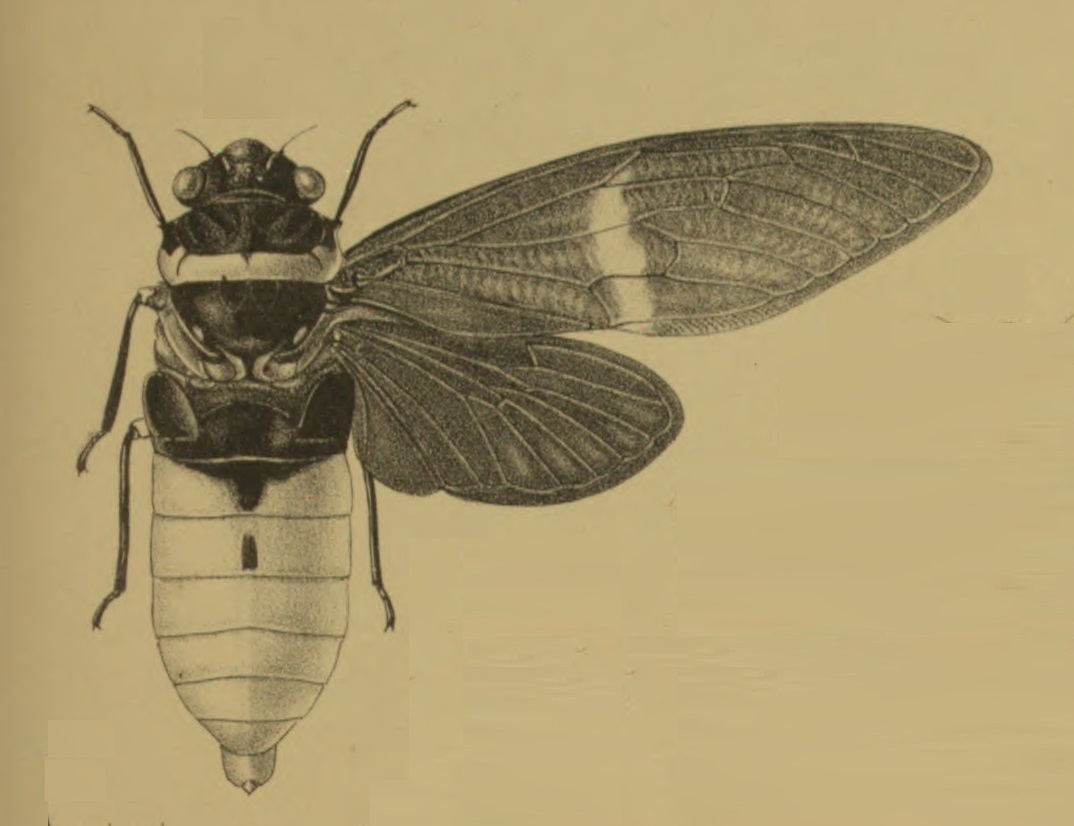
- Tosena fasciata, male

Scientific classification
- Kingdom: Animalia
- Phylum: Arthropoda
- Clade: Pancrustacea
- Class: Insecta
- Order: Hemiptera
- Suborder: Auchenorrhyncha
- Family: Cicadidae
- Genus: Tosena
- Species: T. fasciata

Binomial name
- Tosena fasciata (Fabricius, 1787)

= Tosena fasciata =

Species of true bug

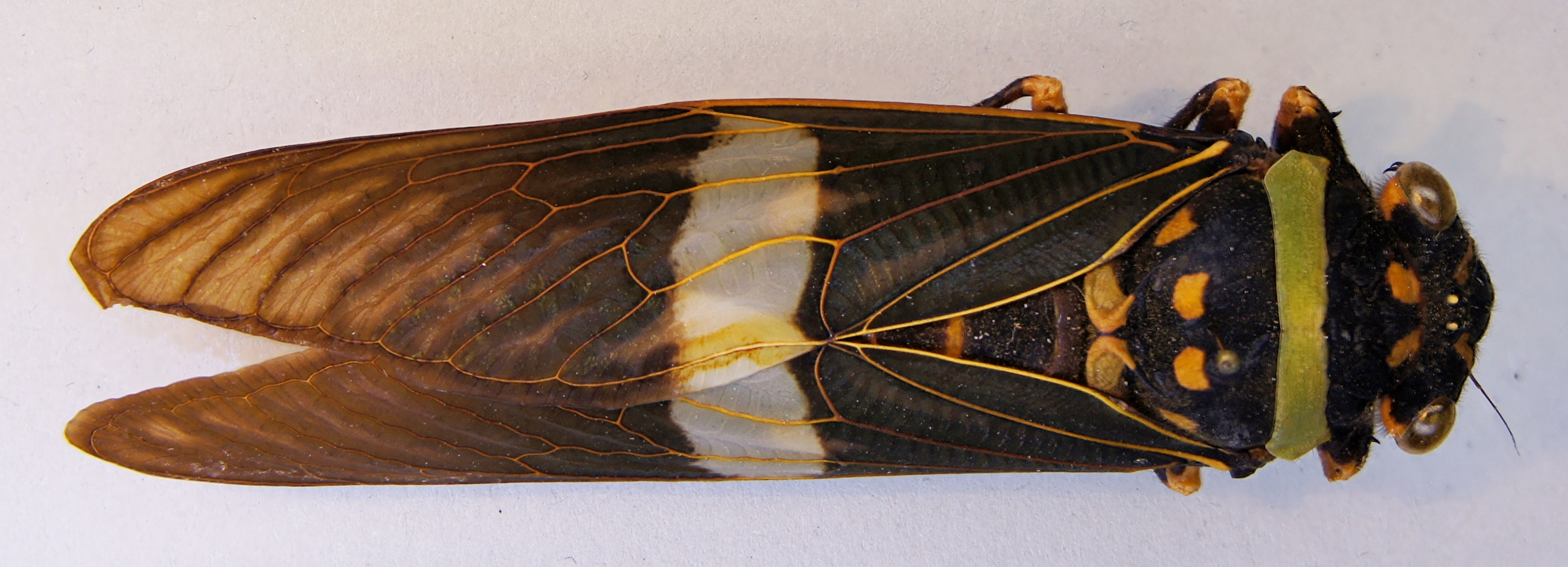
Tosena fasciata at Zoologische Staatssammlung München

Tosena fasciata is a cicada species from Southeast Asia that has been recorded from Sumatra, Java, Borneo and Ambon Island
