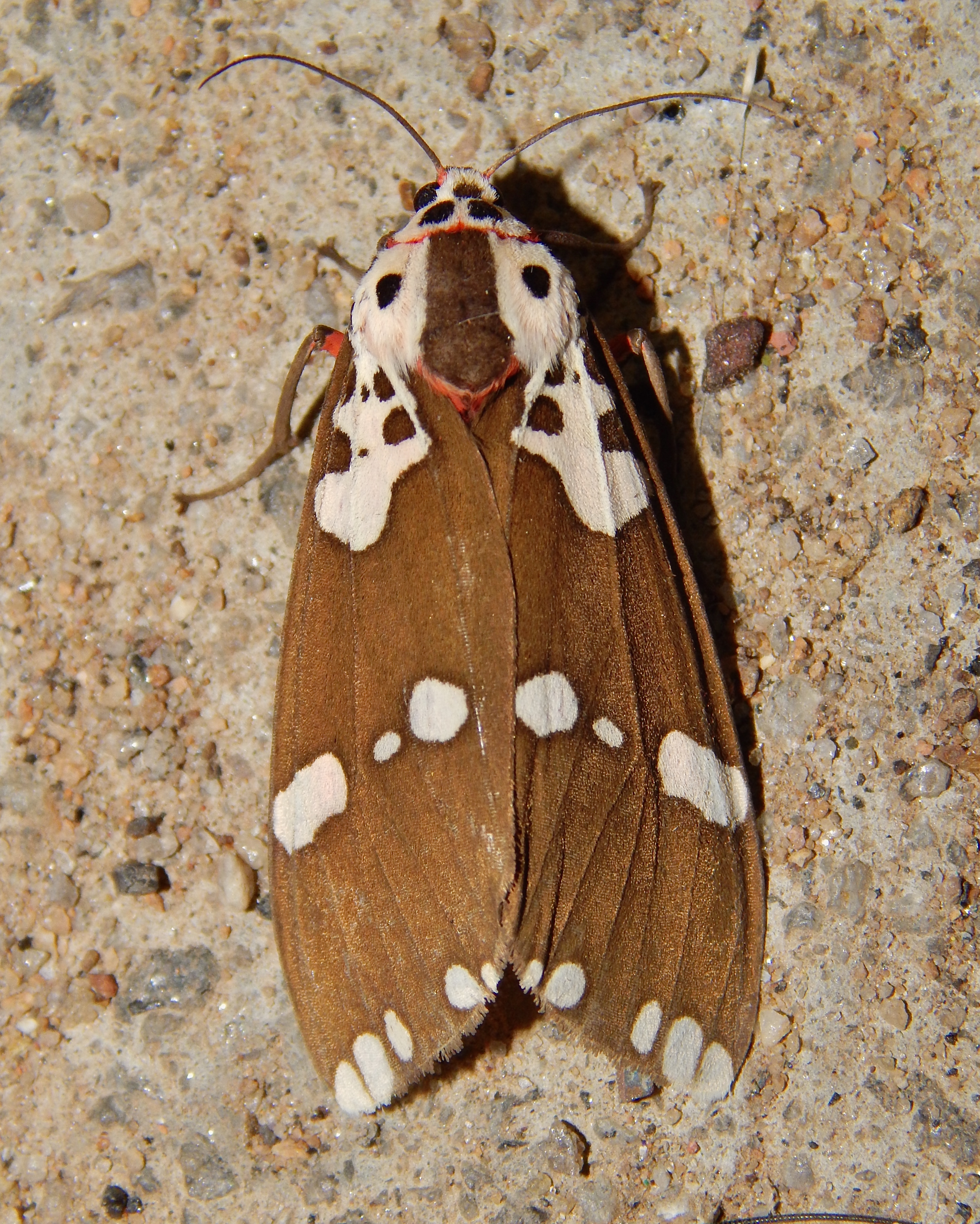

Scientific classification
- Kingdom: Animalia
- Phylum: Arthropoda
- Class: Insecta
- Order: Lepidoptera
- Superfamily: Noctuoidea
- Family: Erebidae
- Subfamily: Arctiinae
- Genus: Pangora
- Species: P. coorgensis

Binomial name
- Pangora coorgensis (Hampson, 1916)

Synonyms
- Pericallia coorgensis Hampson, 1916

= Pangora coorgensis =

Species of moth

Pangora coorgensis is a moth of the family Erebidae. It was described by George Hampson in 1916. It is found in India.
