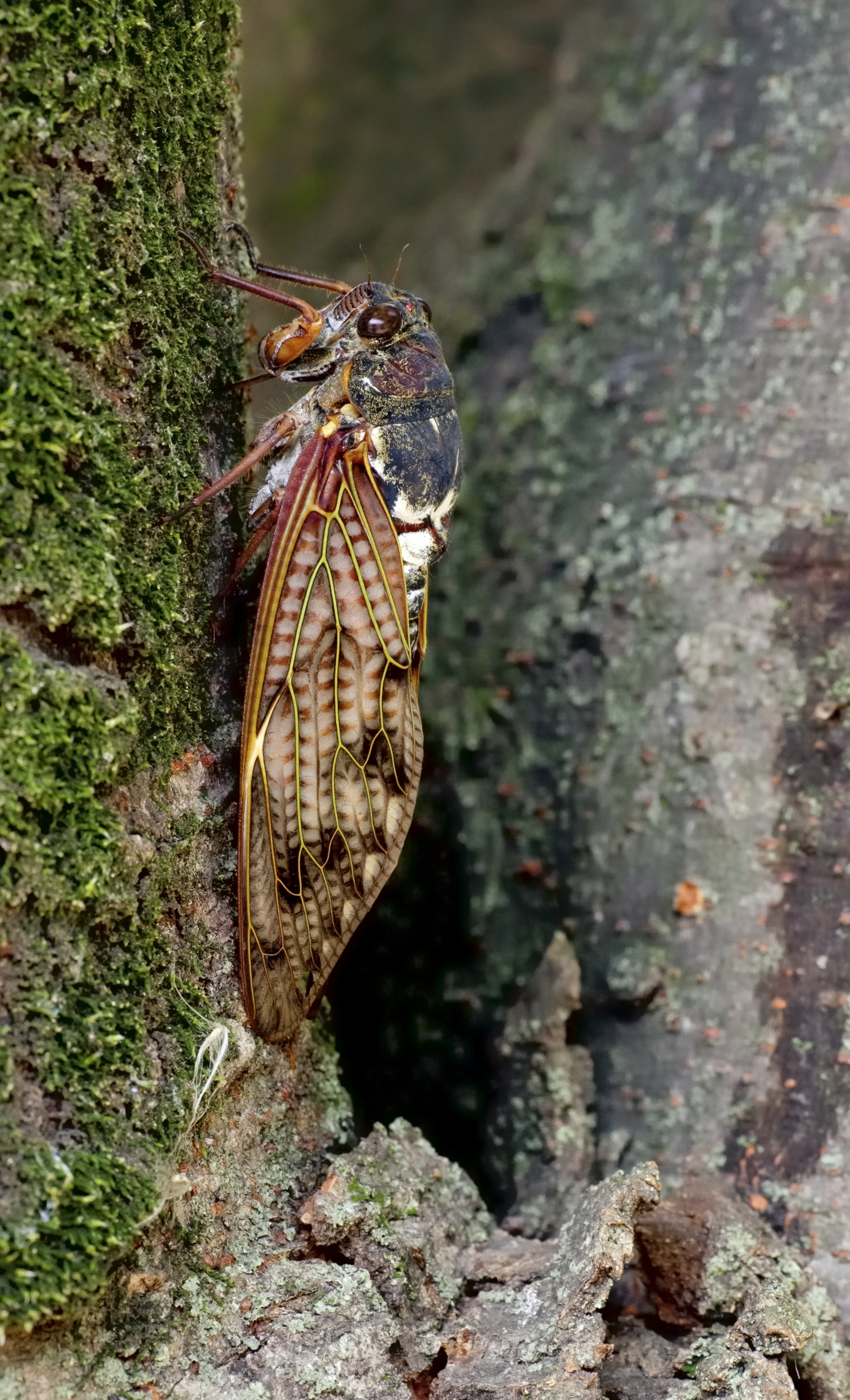

Scientific classification
- Domain: Eukaryota
- Kingdom: Animalia
- Phylum: Arthropoda
- Class: Insecta
- Order: Hemiptera
- Suborder: Auchenorrhyncha
- Family: Cicadidae
- Genus: Graptopsaltria
- Species: G. nigrofuscata

Binomial name
- Graptopsaltria nigrofuscata (Motschulsky, 1866)

= Graptopsaltria nigrofuscata =

Species of true bug

Graptopsaltria nigrofuscata, the large brown cicada, is a species of cicada in the genus Graptopsaltria of the family Cicadidae found across East Asia, including Japan, the Korean Peninsula, and China. They are called aburazemi (アブラゼミ) in Japanese. The males make a loud chirping that ends with a click caused by a flick of the wings.

== Description ==
Large brown cicadae are usually about 55–60 millimetres (2.2–2.4 in) long, having a wingspan of roughly 75 mm (3.0 in).

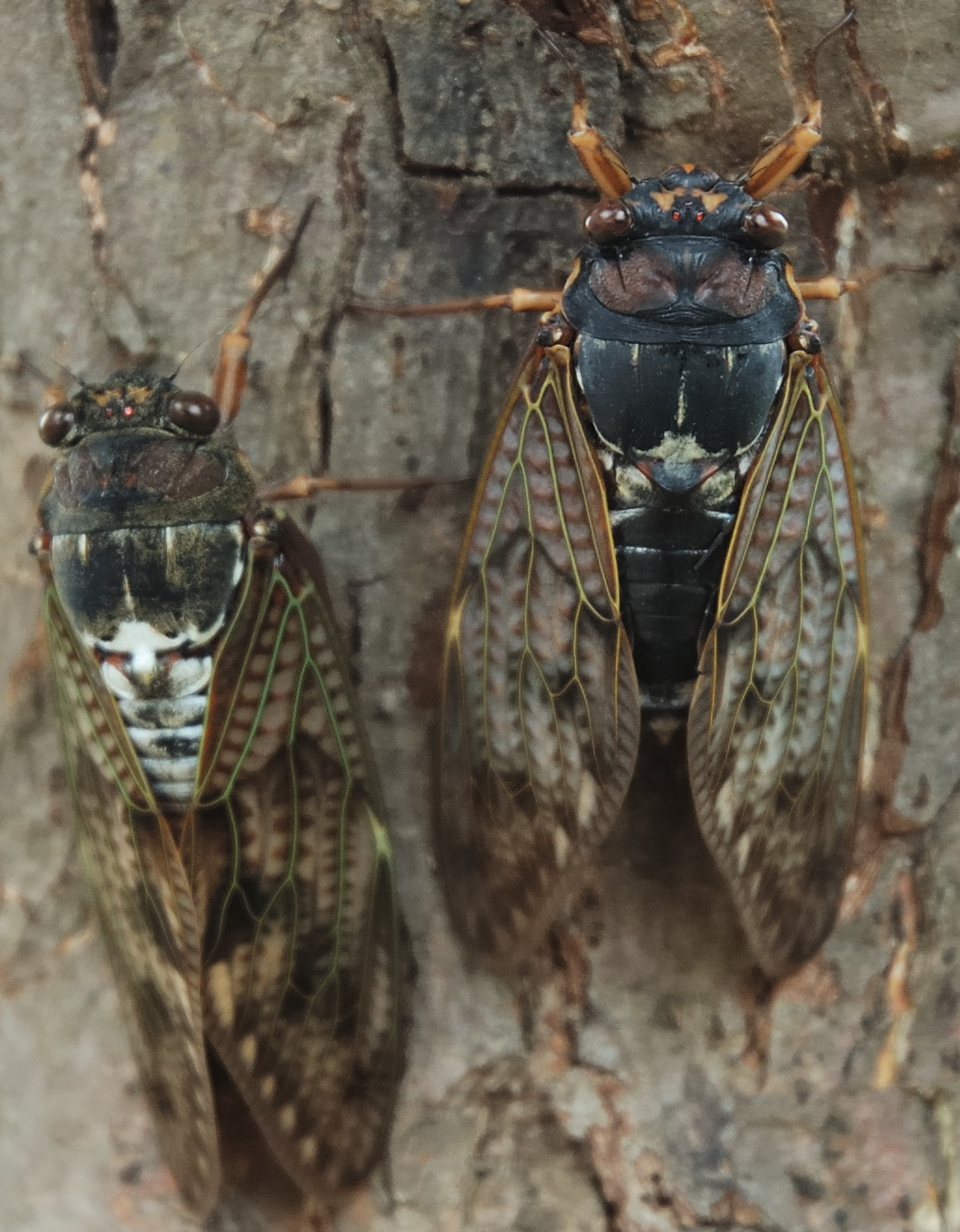
Graptopsaltria nigrofuscata

== Life cycle ==
Their median life cycle from egg to natural adult death is around three years.
