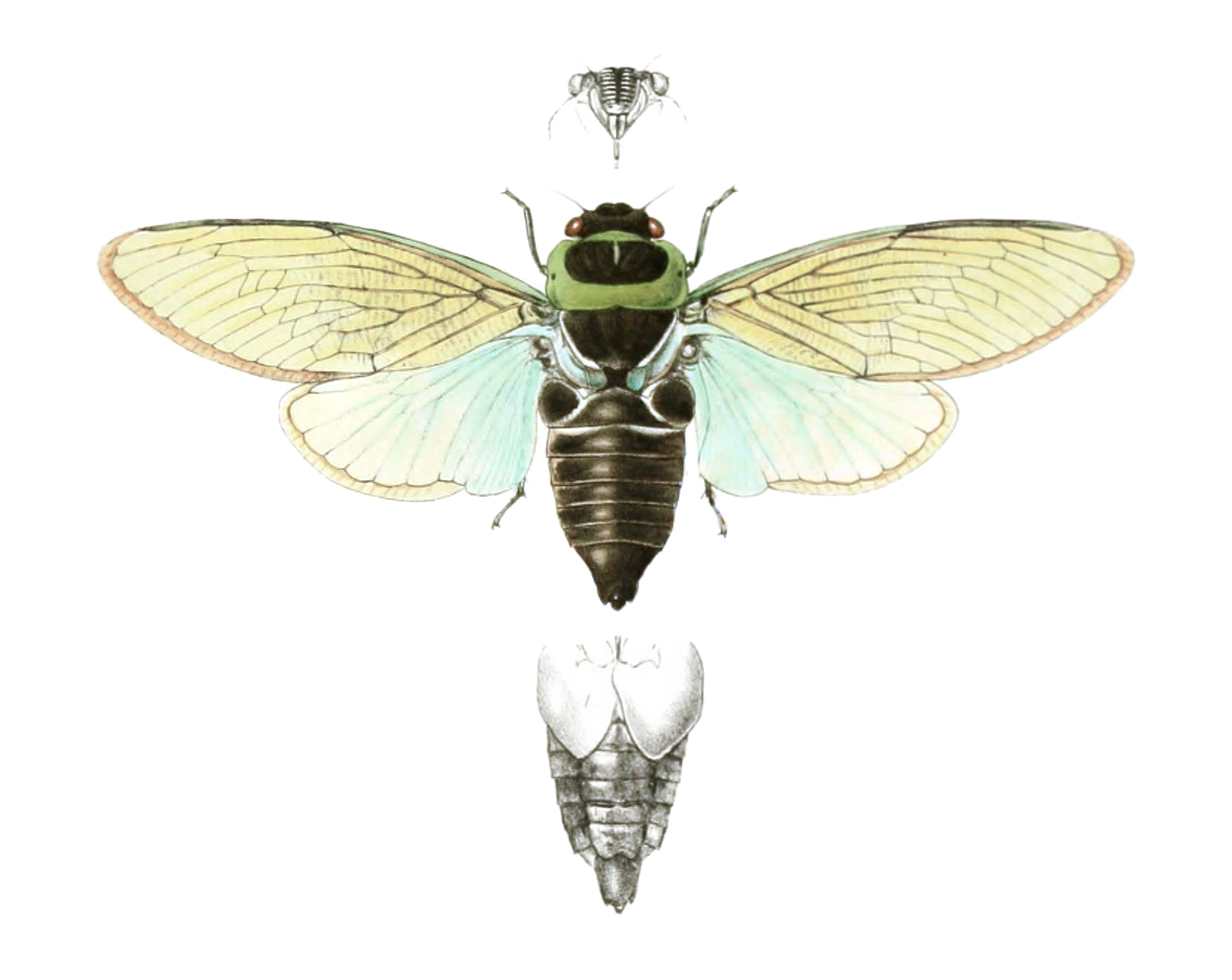
- Angamiana aetherea

Scientific classification
- Kingdom: Animalia
- Phylum: Arthropoda
- Class: Insecta
- Order: Hemiptera
- Suborder: Auchenorrhyncha
- Family: Cicadidae
- Subfamily: Cicadinae
- Tribe: Polyneurini
- Subtribe: Polyneurina
- Genus: Angamiana; Distant, 1890

Synonyms
- Agamiana Distant, 1890

= Angamiana =

Monotypic genus of cicadas

Angamiana is a monotypic genus of Asian cicadas in the tribe Polyneurini, erected by William Lucas Distant.

== Species ==
The single type species is Angamiana aetherea Distant, 1890, recorded only from the Assam region. A number of datases include "A. floridula", found in China and Indochina, but after a 2024 review is now considered synonymous with Proretinata floridula (Distant, 1904): in the monotypic genus Proretinata Chou & Yao, 1986, together with five other species names previously placed here.
