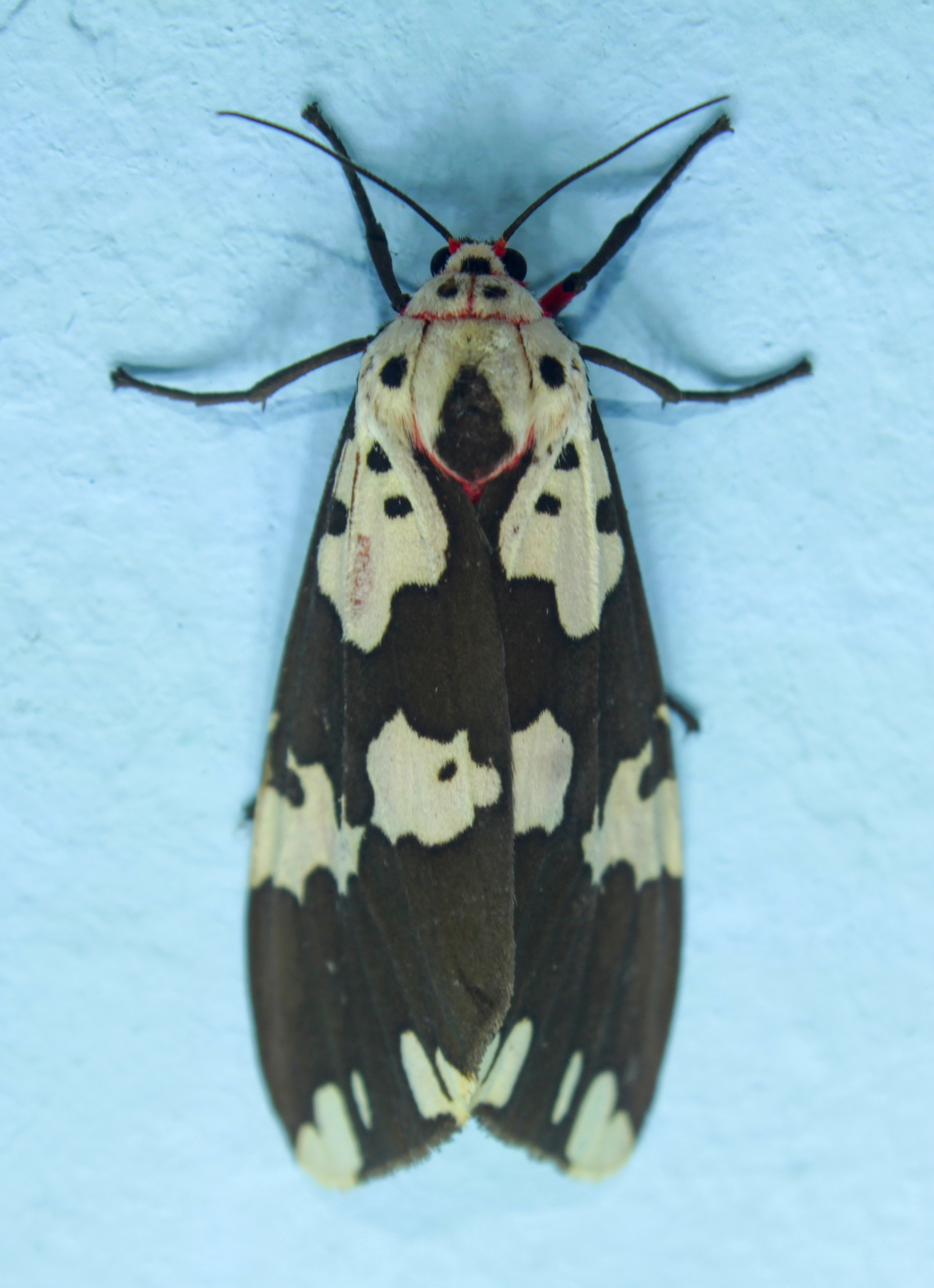
- From Kanjirappally, Kerala, India

Scientific classification
- Domain: Eukaryota
- Kingdom: Animalia
- Phylum: Arthropoda
- Class: Insecta
- Order: Lepidoptera
- Superfamily: Noctuoidea
- Family: Erebidae
- Subfamily: Arctiinae
- Genus: Pangora
- Species: P. matherana

Binomial name
- Pangora matherana Moore, 1879

Synonyms
- Pangora rubelliana Swinhoe, [1890]; Pericallia matherana

= Pangora matherana =

Species of moth

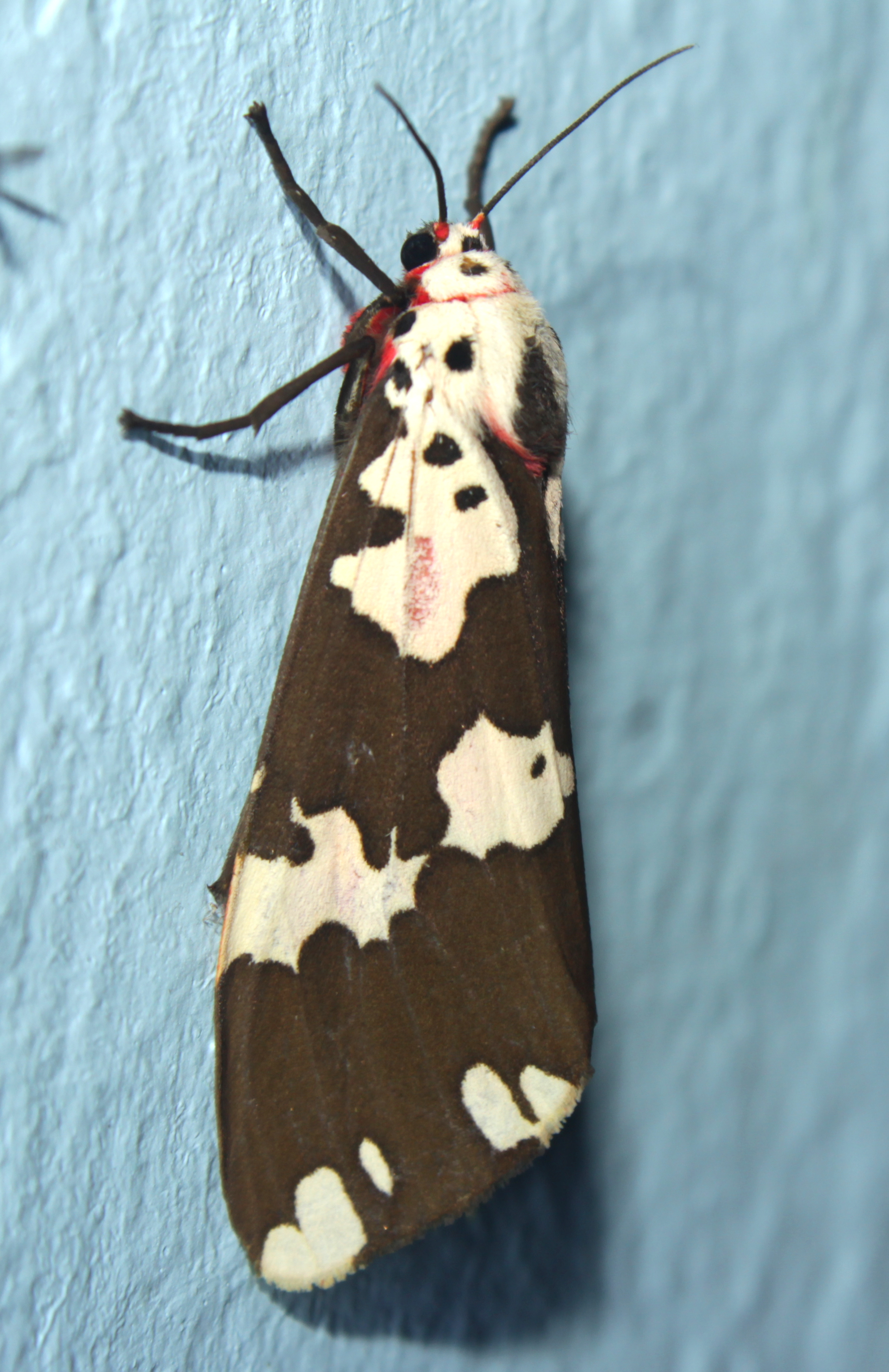
Side view

Pangora matherana is a moth of the family Erebidae. It was described by Frederic Moore in 1879. It is found in southern India.
