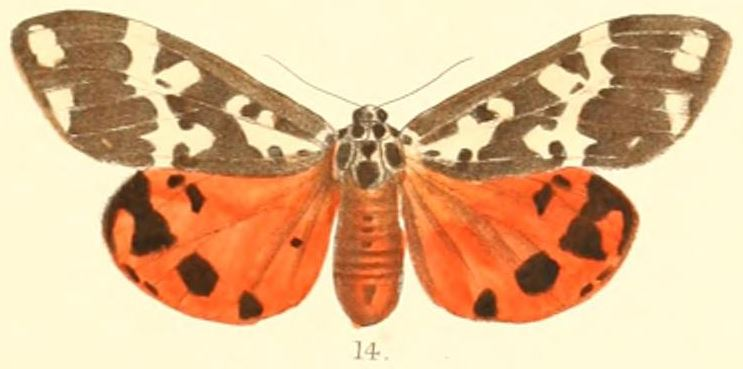

Scientific classification
- Domain: Eukaryota
- Kingdom: Animalia
- Phylum: Arthropoda
- Class: Insecta
- Order: Lepidoptera
- Superfamily: Noctuoidea
- Family: Erebidae
- Subfamily: Arctiinae
- Genus: Pangora
- Species: P. distorta

Binomial name
- Pangora distorta Moore, 1879

Synonyms
- Pericallia ab. flaveola Rothschild, 1914

= Pangora distorta =

Species of moth

Pangora distorta is a moth of the family Erebidae first described by Frederic Moore in 1879. It is found in the north-western Himalayas and Nepal.
