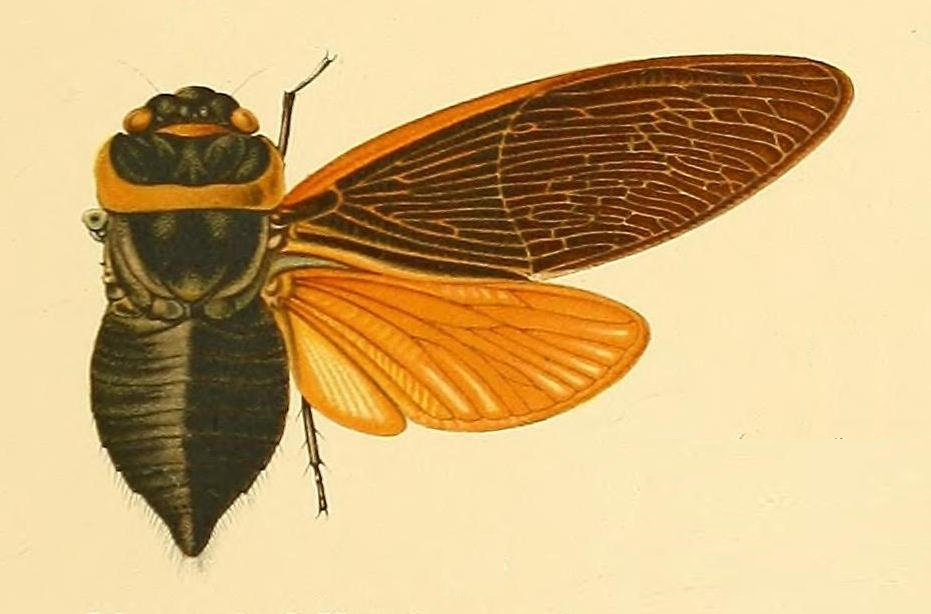
- Polyneura ducalis, female

Scientific classification
- Kingdom: Animalia
- Phylum: Arthropoda
- Clade: Pancrustacea
- Class: Insecta
- Order: Hemiptera
- Suborder: Auchenorrhyncha
- Family: Cicadidae
- Subfamily: Cicadinae
- Tribe: Polyneurini
- Subtribe: Polyneurina
- Genus: Polyneura; Westwood, 1840

= Polyneura =

Genus of true bugs

Polyneura is a cicada genus from Southeast Asia. The type species is Polyneura ducalis with type material from India.

== Species ==
As of May 2025, the World Auchenorrhyncha Database includes:

1. Polyneura cheni Chou & Yao, 1986 - southern China, Thailand
2. Polyneura ducalis Westwood, 1840 - Indian subcontinent, Indochina, Malesia
