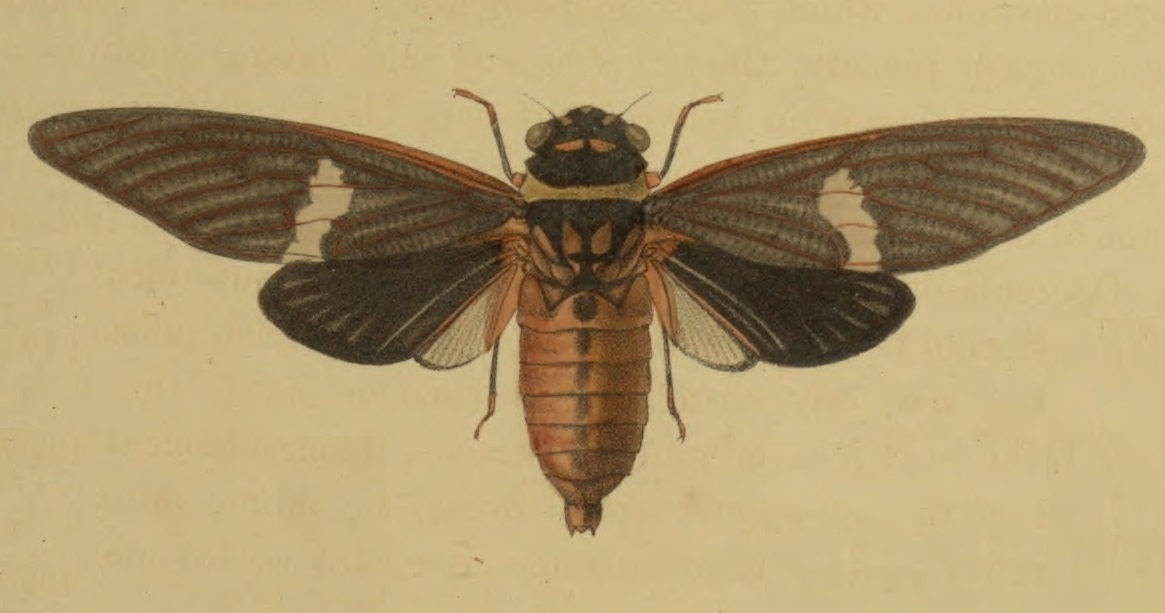
- Tosena depicta

Scientific classification
- Kingdom: Animalia
- Phylum: Arthropoda
- Clade: Pancrustacea
- Class: Insecta
- Order: Hemiptera
- Suborder: Auchenorrhyncha
- Family: Cicadidae
- Genus: Tosena
- Species: T. depicta

Binomial name
- Tosena depicta (Distant, 1888)

= Tosena depicta =

Species of true bug

Tosena depicta is a cicada species from Southeast Asia
