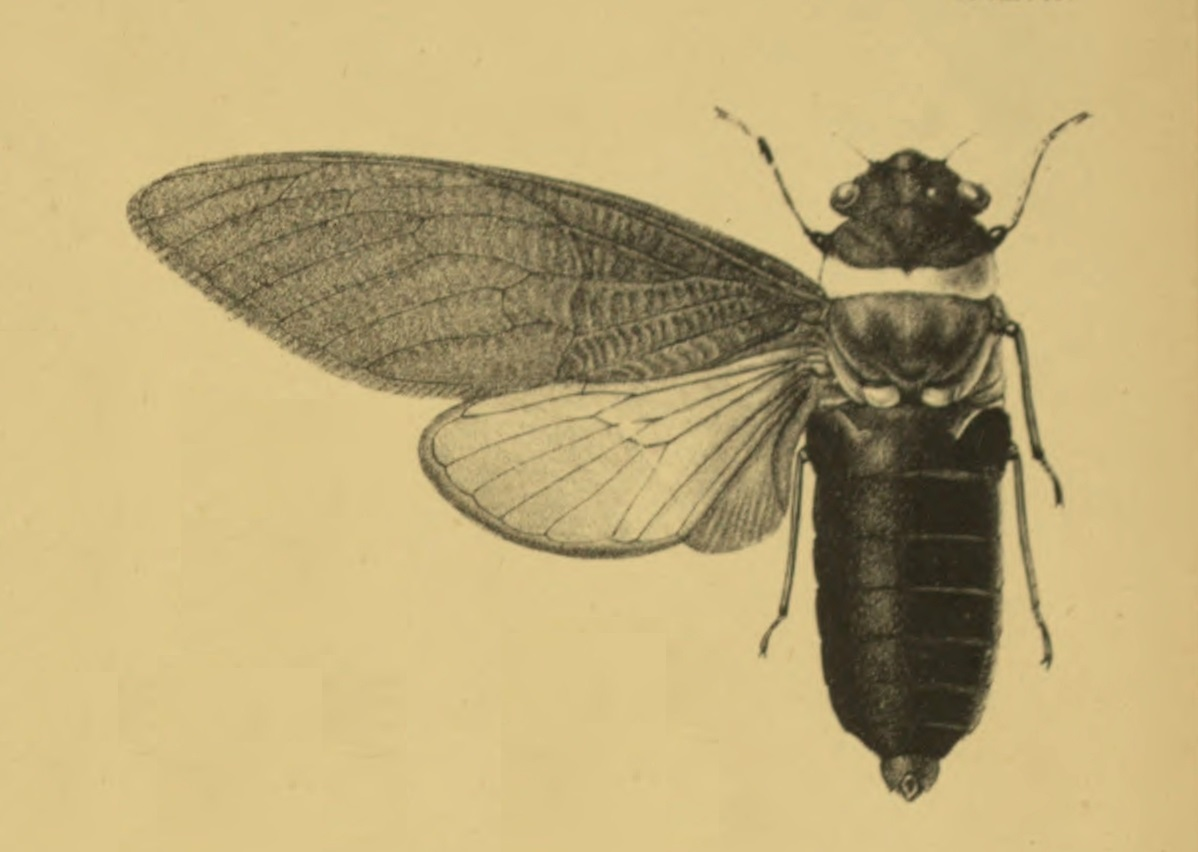
- Tosena mearesiana, male

Scientific classification
- Kingdom: Animalia
- Phylum: Arthropoda
- Clade: Pancrustacea
- Class: Insecta
- Order: Hemiptera
- Suborder: Auchenorrhyncha
- Family: Cicadidae
- Genus: Tosena
- Species: T. mearesiana

Binomial name
- Tosena mearesiana (Westwood, 1842)

= Tosena mearesiana =

Species of true bug

Tosena mearesiana is a cicada species from Southeast Asia. It was described in 1842 by Westwood from a specimen originating from the Himalayas. It has also been recorded from Sikkim in India.
