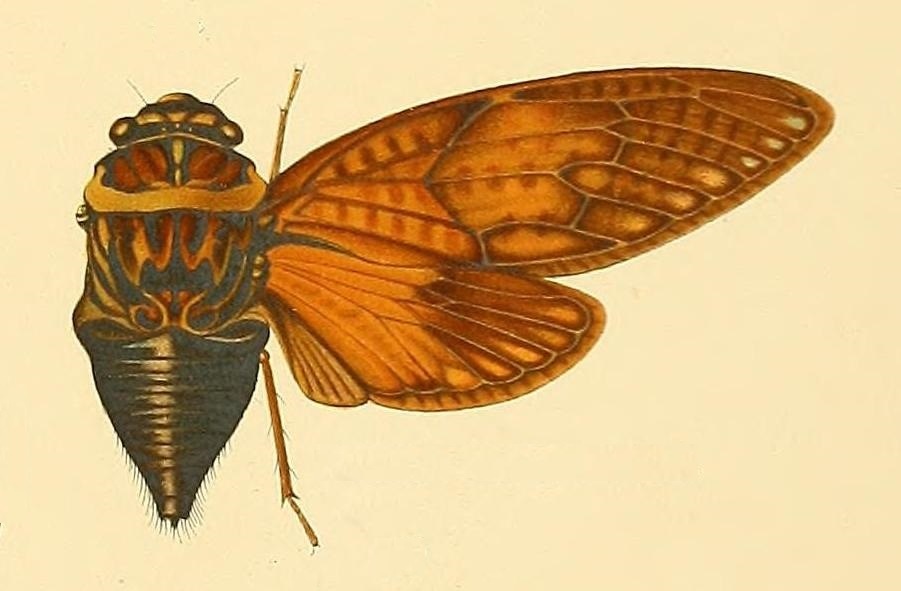
- Graptopsaltria tienta, female

Scientific classification
- Domain: Eukaryota
- Kingdom: Animalia
- Phylum: Arthropoda
- Class: Insecta
- Order: Hemiptera
- Suborder: Auchenorrhyncha
- Family: Cicadidae
- Subfamily: Cicadinae
- Tribe: Polyneurini
- Subtribe: Formotosenina
- Genus: Graptopsaltria; Stål, 1866

Species
- See text

= Graptopsaltria =

Genus of true bugs

Graptopsaltria is a genus of cicadas from East Asia.

== Species ==
- Graptopsaltria bimaculata Kato, 1925
- Graptopsaltria colorata Stål, 1866
- † Graptopsaltria inaba Fujiyama, 1982
- Graptopsaltria nigrofuscata (Motschulsky, 1866)
- Graptopsaltria tienta Karsch, 1894
