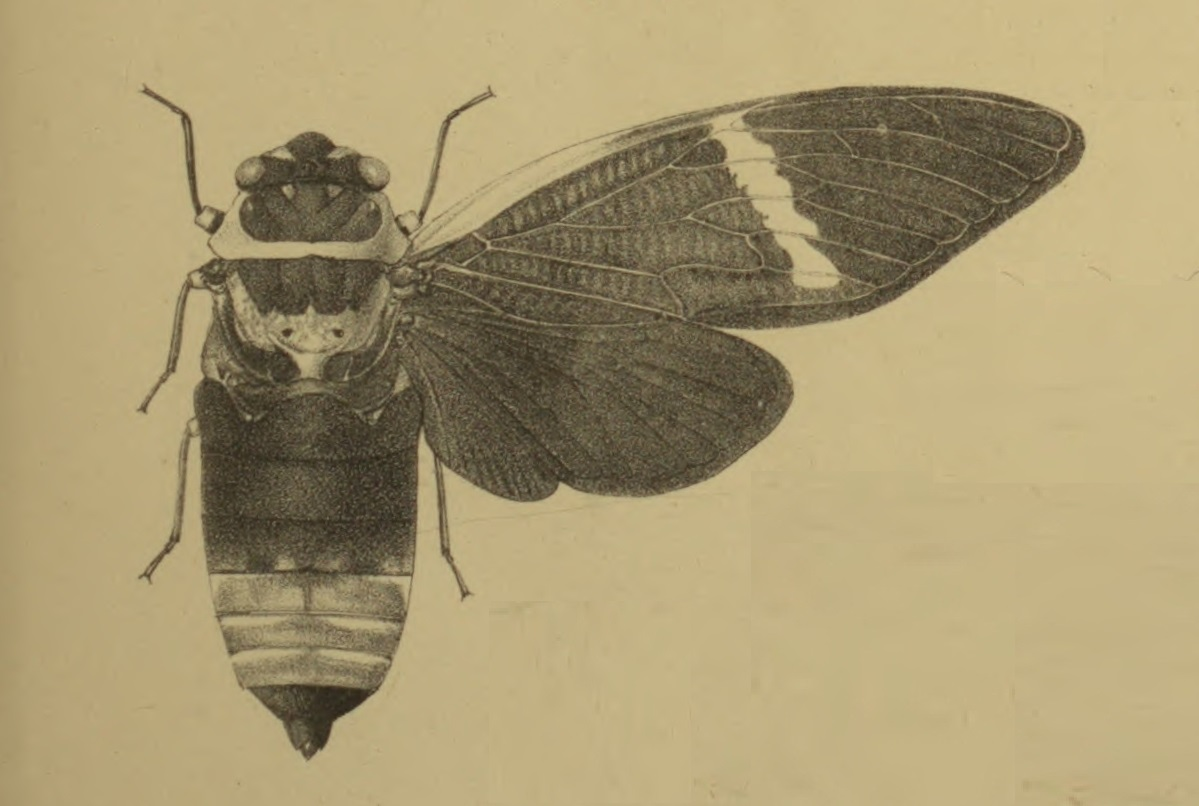
- Formotosena montivaga, male

Scientific classification
- Kingdom: Animalia
- Phylum: Arthropoda
- Clade: Pancrustacea
- Class: Insecta
- Order: Hemiptera
- Suborder: Auchenorrhyncha
- Family: Cicadidae
- Genus: Formotosena
- Species: F. montivaga

Binomial name
- Formotosena montivaga (Distant, 1889)

Synonyms
- Tosena montivaga Distant, 1889

= Formotosena montivaga =

Species of true bug

Formotosena montivaga is a cicada species from Southeast Asia that was formerly placed in the genus Tosena. It was described in 1889 by Distant from material collected in the Naga Hills which are on the border of India and Burma.
