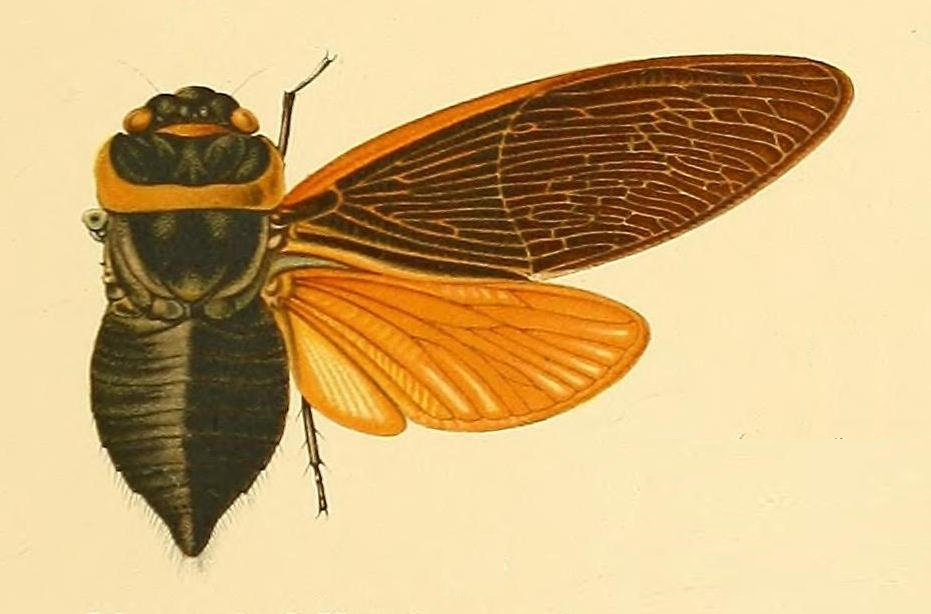
- Polyneura ducalis, female

Scientific classification
- Domain: Eukaryota
- Kingdom: Animalia
- Phylum: Arthropoda
- Class: Insecta
- Order: Hemiptera
- Suborder: Auchenorrhyncha
- Superfamily: Cicadoidea
- Family: Cicadidae
- Subfamily: Cicadinae
- Tribe: Polyneurini; Amyot & Audinet-Serville, 1843

= Polyneurini =

Tribe of true bugs

The Polyneurini are a tribe of cicadas found in the Palearctic and Indomalaya.

== Genera ==
The World Auchenorrhyncha Database includes two subtribes:

=== Formotosenina ===
Authority: Boulard, 2008

1. Formotosena Kato, 1925
2. Graptopsaltria Stål, 1866

=== Polyneurina ===
Authority: Amyot & Audinet-Serville, 1843

1. Angamiana Distant, 1890
2. Parapolyneura Wang, Hayashi & Wei, 2024 - monotypic P. guoliangi Wang & Liu, 2022
3. Polyneura Westwood in Jardine, 1840
4. Proretinata Chou & Yao, 1986
