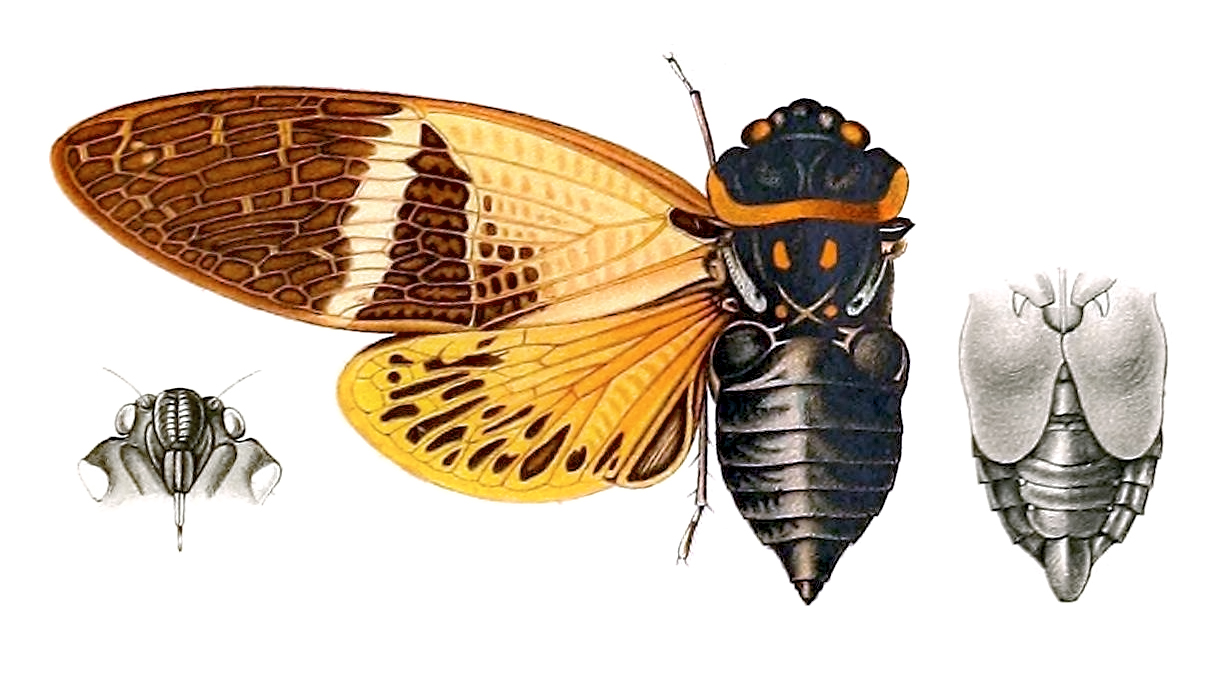
- Proretinata floridula, male

Scientific classification
- Domain: Eukaryota
- Kingdom: Animalia
- Phylum: Arthropoda
- Class: Insecta
- Order: Hemiptera
- Suborder: Auchenorrhyncha
- Family: Cicadidae
- Subfamily: Cicadinae
- Tribe: Polyneurini
- Genus: Proretinata; Chou & Yao, 1986
- Species: P. floridula

Binomial name
- Proretinata floridula (Distant, 1904)

Synonyms
- List: Angamiana bauflei Boulard, 1994; Angamiana beauflei [sic] (Boulard, 1994); Angamiana floridula beauflei [sic] (Distant, 1904); Angamiana florida (Hayashi, 1982) non Distant, 1904; Angamiana florida [sic] (Distant, 1904); Proretinata fuscula Chou & Yao, 1986; Angamiana masamii Boulard, 2005; Angamiana melanoptera Boulard, 2005; Proretinata vemacula Chou & Yao, 1986; Proretinata vemaculata [sic] Chou & Yao, 1986; Proretinata yunnanensis Chou & Yao, 1986

= Proretinata =

Monotypic genus of cicadas

Proretinata is a monotypic genus of Asian cicadas belonging to the tribe Polyneurini (subtribe Polyneurina); it was erected by Chou and Yao in 1986, with the name derived from Greek: πρό (before) and retina (Latin for net, strap or rope), referring to the grey-white transverse stripe on the forewing.

== Species, distribution and nomenclature ==
The single species Proretinata floridula (Distant, 1904) was long placed in the genus Angamiana (erected by Distant), but moved in 2024 after synonymy was established with the type Proretinata fuscula Chou & Yao, 1986. The distribution records for this species include southern China and Indochina.
