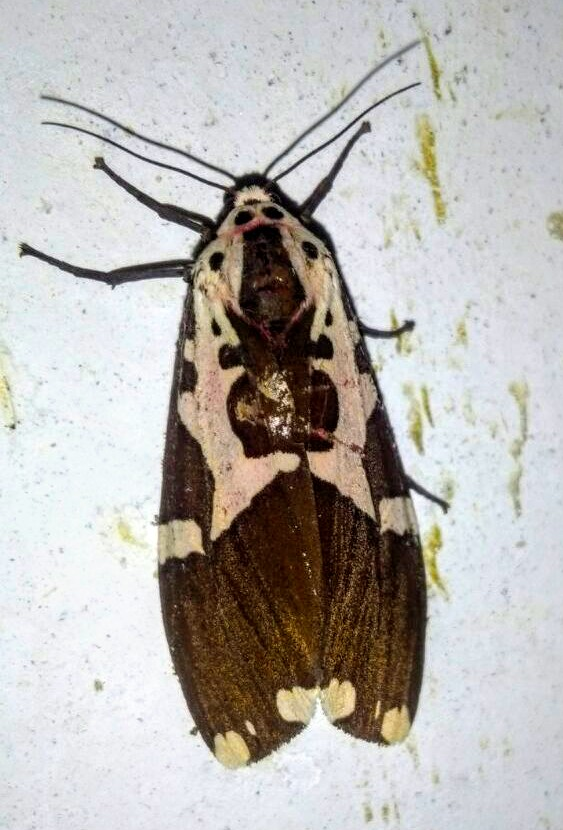

Scientific classification
- Kingdom: Animalia
- Phylum: Arthropoda
- Class: Insecta
- Order: Lepidoptera
- Superfamily: Noctuoidea
- Family: Erebidae
- Subfamily: Arctiinae
- Genus: Pangora
- Species: P. erosa

Binomial name
- Pangora erosa (Walker, 1855)

Synonyms
- Aloa erosa Walker, 1855; Aethalida erosa; Pericallia erosa; Pericallia erosa ab. confluens Rothschild, 1914; Pericallia erosa ab. travancorica Strand, 1919

= Pangora erosa =

Species of moth

Pangora erosa is a moth of the family Erebidae. It was described by Francis Walker in 1855. It is found in India (Travancore, Nilgiris) and Sri Lanka.

== Description ==
Male Pangora erosa possess crimson palpi (segmented appendages near the mouth) with a black third joint. The head is typically whitish with a black spot on the vertex. Its collar and tegulae (small hardened components in the wings) are white, with pairs of black spots, while its thorax is typically brown with white stripes near the tegulae. The abdomen is crimson, with a series of brown spots, and its legs are similarly striped with crimson.

In females, small, sub-marginal spots are visible on the forewings, while the hindwings have medial brown spots.

Larvae are dark brown clothed, with a dense tuft of blackish hair.

== Ecology ==
The larvae feed on Gloriosa superba and Thunbergia species.
