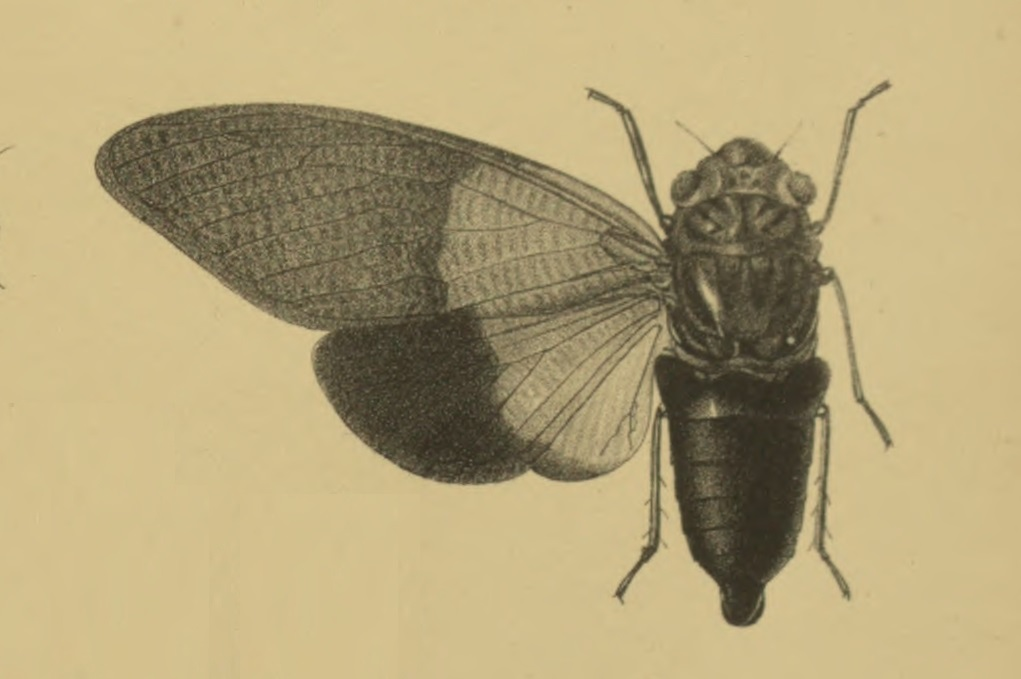
- Trengganua sibylla, male

Scientific classification
- Kingdom: Animalia
- Phylum: Arthropoda
- Clade: Pancrustacea
- Class: Insecta
- Order: Hemiptera
- Suborder: Auchenorrhyncha
- Family: Cicadidae
- Subfamily: Cicadinae
- Tribe: Gaeanini
- Genus: Trengganua; Moulton, 1923
- Species: T. sibylla

Binomial name
- Trengganua sibylla (Stål, 1863)

= Trengganua sibylla =

Species of true bug

Trengganua sibylla is a cicada species from Southeast Asia, and the sole member of the genus Trengganua. The species is recorded from Terengganu, Jelebu and Temengor Forest Reserve in Peninsular Malaysia. Trengganua sibylla typically sings around high noon.
