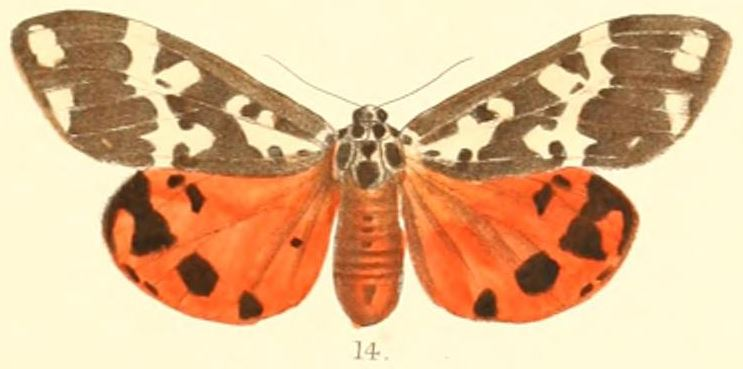
- Pangora distorta

Scientific classification
- Kingdom: Animalia
- Phylum: Arthropoda
- Clade: Pancrustacea
- Class: Insecta
- Order: Lepidoptera
- Superfamily: Noctuoidea
- Family: Erebidae
- Subfamily: Arctiinae
- Subtribe: Spilosomina
- Genus: Pangora; Moore, 1879

Type species
- Pangora distorta Moore, 1879

= Pangora =

Genus of moths

Pangora is a genus of moths in the family Erebidae from Nepal, India and Sri Lanka. The genus was erected by Frederic Moore in 1879.

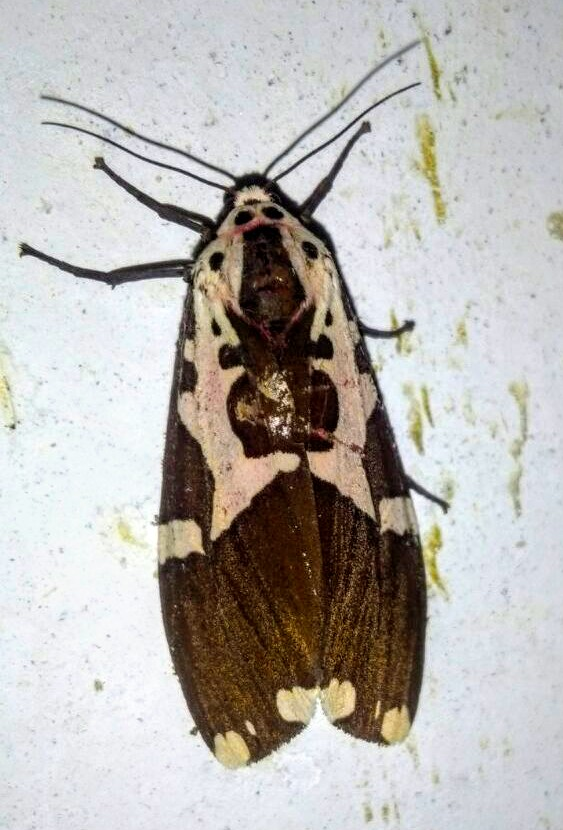
Pangora erosa from Sri Lanka

== Description ==
Palpi not projecting beyond the frons. Antennae almost simple in both sexes. Hind tibia with two pairs of spurs. Forewings are rather long and narrow.

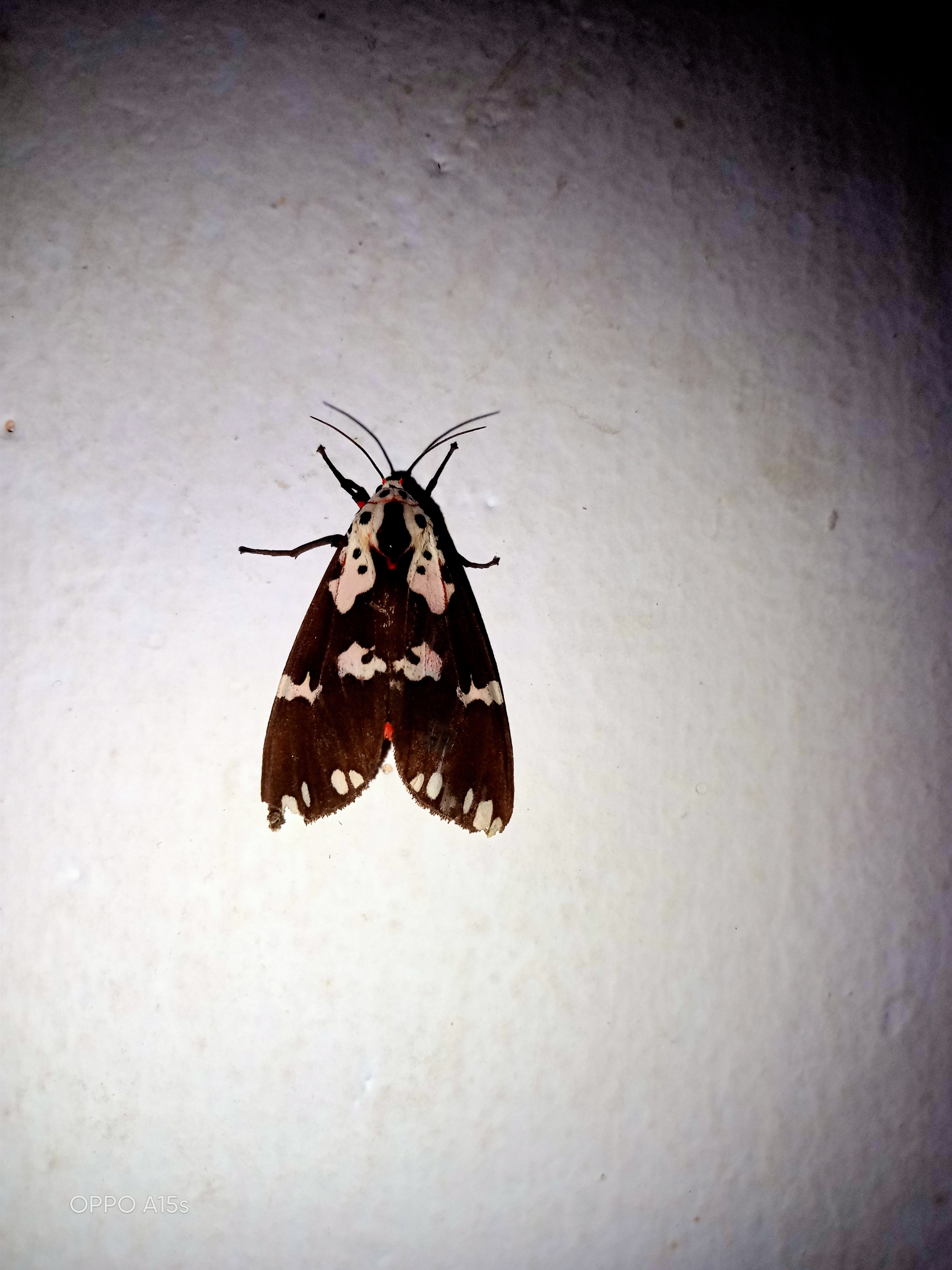
Pangora found at Kannur, India

== Species ==
- Pangora coorgensis (Hampson, 1916)
- Pangora distorta Moore, 1879
- Pangora erosa (Walker, 1855)
- Pangora matherana Moore, 1879
