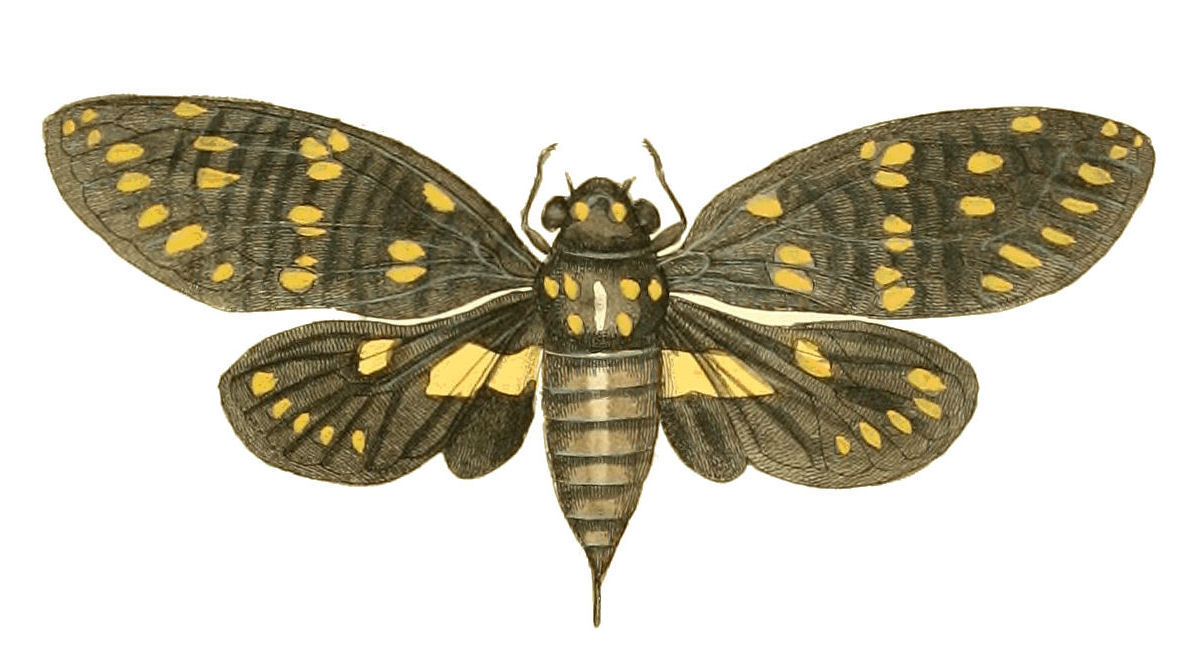

Scientific classification
- Kingdom: Animalia
- Phylum: Arthropoda
- Class: Insecta
- Order: Hemiptera
- Suborder: Auchenorrhyncha
- Family: Cicadidae
- Genus: Gaeana
- Species: G. maculata

Binomial name
- Gaeana maculata (Drury, 1773)

Synonyms
- Cicada maculata Drury, 1773

= Gaeana maculata =

Species of true bug

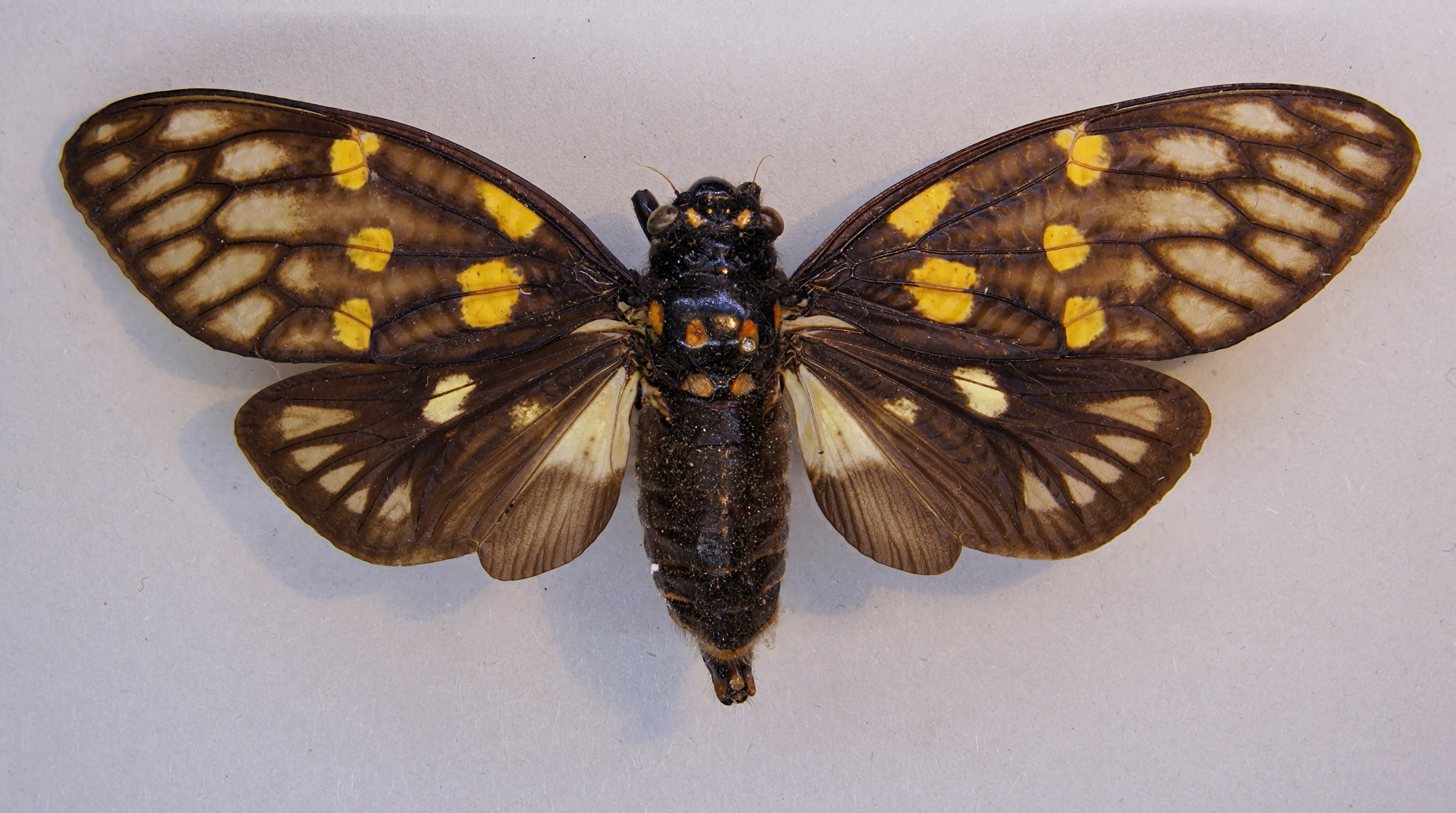
Gaeana maculata at Zoologische Staatssammlung München

Gaeana maculata is the type species of cicadas in the genus Gaeana. It was first described by Dru Drury in 1773, from China and now three subspecies have been identified:

1. G. maculata barbouri Liu, 1940
2. G. maculata distanti Liu, 1940
3. G. maculata maculata (Drury, 1773) – type (as Cicada maculata Drury)

== Description ==
Upper side: head black. Eyes yellow brown, round, and projecting from the head a little; between them are two small orange spots. Antennae small and short. Thorax black, with four orange spots in a row, placed across it, and behind them two others. Abdomen black, consisting of seven annuli or rings, besides the tail part, the last of which is edged with orange. Anus orange-coloured, and furnished with a bristle for oviposition. Wings black, spotted, and streaked with orange; the anterior having a row of streaks along the external edges, and five distinct orange spots crossing the middle, near the shoulders: the posterior having a large orange patch on the abdominal edges, and a small round spot above it, with five small fainter ones placed along the external edges.

Under side: head black, terminating in a long slender beak, which extends between the legs, to the abdomen; two small orange spots are placed just below the eyes. Thorax with an orange spot on each side. Legs and abdomen black; the latter having six orange spots, three on each side. Wings as on the upper side. Wing-span 3¾ inches (95 mm).
