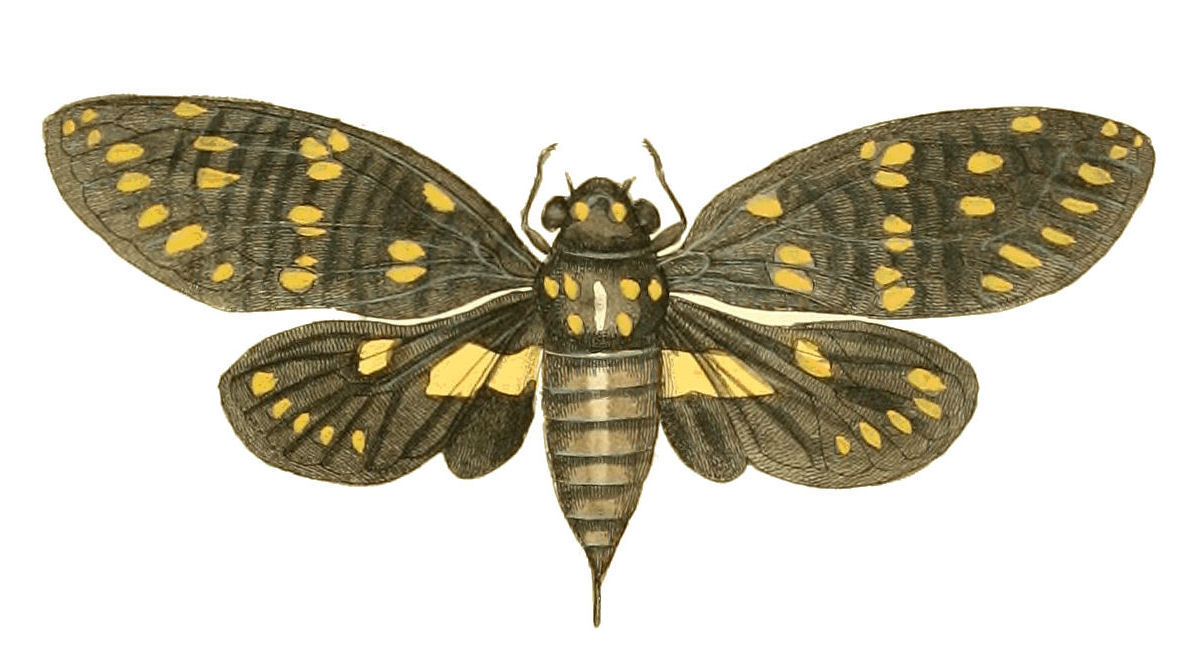
- Gaeana maculata

Scientific classification
- Kingdom: Animalia
- Phylum: Arthropoda
- Clade: Pancrustacea
- Class: Insecta
- Order: Hemiptera
- Suborder: Auchenorrhyncha
- Family: Cicadidae
- Tribe: Gaeanini
- Genus: Gaeana; Amyot & Serville, 1843

Type species
- Cicada maculata Drury, 1773

Synonyms
- Gaena, Geaena (misspelling)

= Gaeana =

Genus of true bugs

Gaeana (from Sanskrit: गायन, romanized: gāyana, lit. 'singer') is a genus of cicadas, most members of which have colourful marking on their forewings, found across tropical and temperate Asia. Their bright wing patterns have been hypothesized as being a case of Batesian mimicry where the toxic models may be day-flying moths of the subfamilies Zygaeninae and Arctiinae. It was thought to be related to the genus Tosena but is differentiated by the exposed tympanum and lacks spines on the sides of the pronotum and now in a separate tribe.

Some species like G. maculata have been found to show a great deal of patterning variability across geography.

== Species ==
Species included in the genus have varied over time. A molecular phylogeny study in 2025 retains only three species within the genus:

1. Gaeana atkinsoni Distant, 1892
2. Gaeana maculata (Drury, 1773) - type species - with several former species synonymized - G. consors, G. hainanensis, G. cheni and G. nigra
3. Gaeana chinensis Kato, 1940
