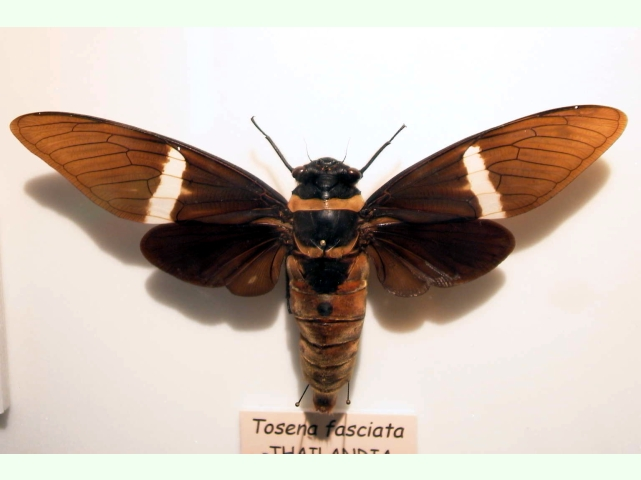
- Tosena fasciata specimen

Scientific classification
- Domain: Eukaryota
- Kingdom: Animalia
- Phylum: Arthropoda
- Class: Insecta
- Order: Hemiptera
- Suborder: Auchenorrhyncha
- Family: Cicadidae
- Subfamily: Cicadinae
- Tribe: Tosenini
- Genus: Tosena; Amyot & Serville, 1843

Species
- See text

= Tosena =

Genus of true bugs

Tosena (from Chinese: 篤蟬; pinyin: dǔchán; Wade–Giles: tu^{3} ch'an^{2}; lit. 'thick cicada') is a genus of cicadas from South-East Asia. Species formerly included in Tosena are Distantalna splendida, Formotosena montivaga, Formotosena seebohmi, Trengganua sibylla and two species now placed in Vittagaeana, with Tosena the only genus of tribe Tosenini.

== List of species ==
The Global Biodiversity Information Facility lists:

1. Tosena albata Distant, 1878
2. Tosena depicta Distant, 1888
3. Tosena fasciata (Fabricius, 1787) - type species
4. Tosena melanoptera (White, 1846)
5. Tosena mearesiana (Westwood, 1842)

Note: Two species, Tosena dives and T. paviei, in this "taxonomically unstable group of Asian cicada tribes", were moved by Hill et al. in 2021 to the new genus Vittagaeana: now placed in the Gaeanini.
