= Paratalainga =

Scientific classification
- Kingdom: Animalia
- Phylum: Arthropoda
- Class: Insecta
- Order: Hemiptera
- Suborder: Auchenorrhyncha
- Family: Cicadidae
- Subfamily: Cicadinae
- Tribe: Gaeanini
- Genus: Paratalainga; He, 1984

Synonyms
- Chouia Chou, Lei & Yao, 1992

Genus of true bugs

External image
- Images at iNaturalist

Paratalainga is a genus of Asian cicadas in the tribe Gaeanini, erected by J.C He in 1984. Species have been recorded from China and Indochina.

== Species ==
The Global Biodiversity Information Facility includes:

1. Paratalainga distanti (Jacobi, 1902)
2. Paratalainga fucipennis He, 1984
3. Paratalainga fumosa Chou & Lei, 1992
4. Paratalainga reticulata He, 1984 - type species from China
5. Paratalainga yunnanensis Chou & Lei, 1992 (synonym P. guizhouensis Chou & Lei, 1992)
