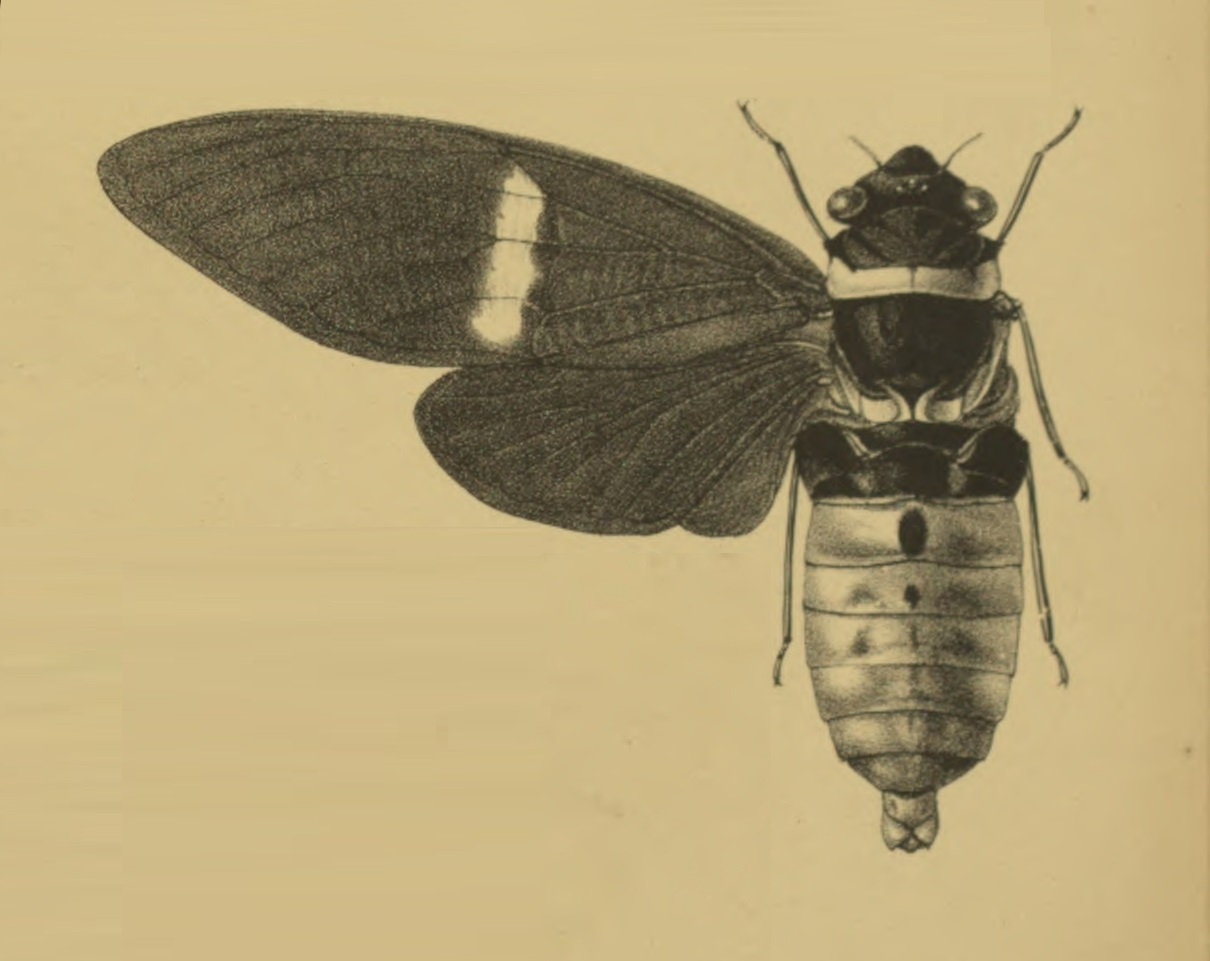
- Tosena melanoptera, male

Scientific classification
- Kingdom: Animalia
- Phylum: Arthropoda
- Clade: Pancrustacea
- Class: Insecta
- Order: Hemiptera
- Suborder: Auchenorrhyncha
- Family: Cicadidae
- Genus: Tosena
- Species: T. melanoptera

Binomial name
- Tosena melanoptera (White, 1846)

Synonyms
- Tosena melanopteryx Kirkaldy, 1909

= Tosena melanoptera =

Species of cicada

Tosena melanoptera is a cicada species from Southeast Asia. It was described by White in 1846 from material collected in North India. It has also been recorded from Thailand and Vietnam.
