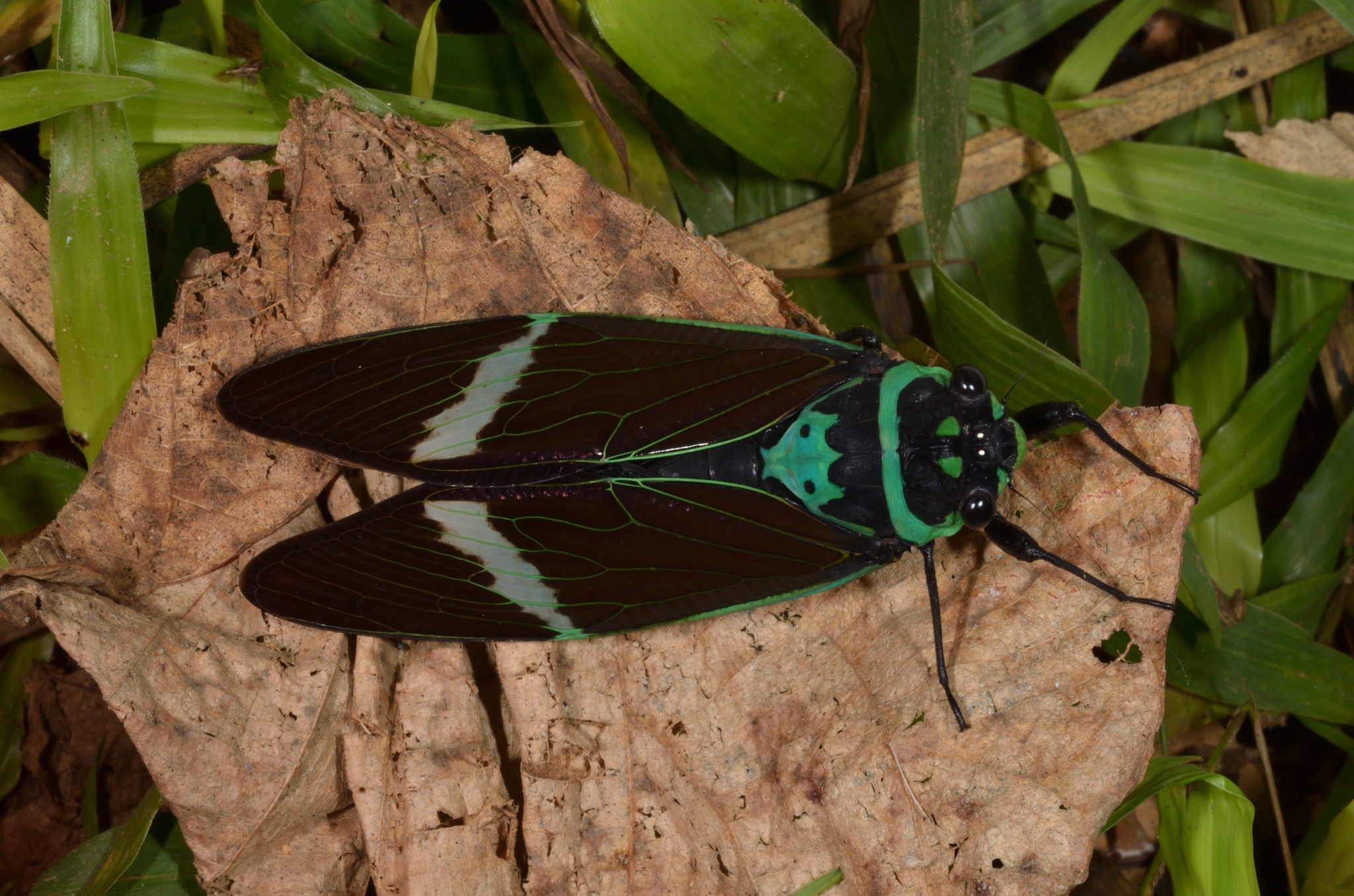

Scientific classification
- Kingdom: Animalia
- Phylum: Arthropoda
- Clade: Pancrustacea
- Class: Insecta
- Order: Hemiptera
- Suborder: Auchenorrhyncha
- Family: Cicadidae
- Genus: Formotosena
- Species: F. seebohmi

Binomial name
- Formotosena seebohmi (Distant, 1904)

Synonyms
- Tosena seebohmi Distant, 1904

= Formotosena seebohmi =

Species of true bug

Formotosena seebohmi is a cicada species from Taiwan, China, Vietnam and Japan.
