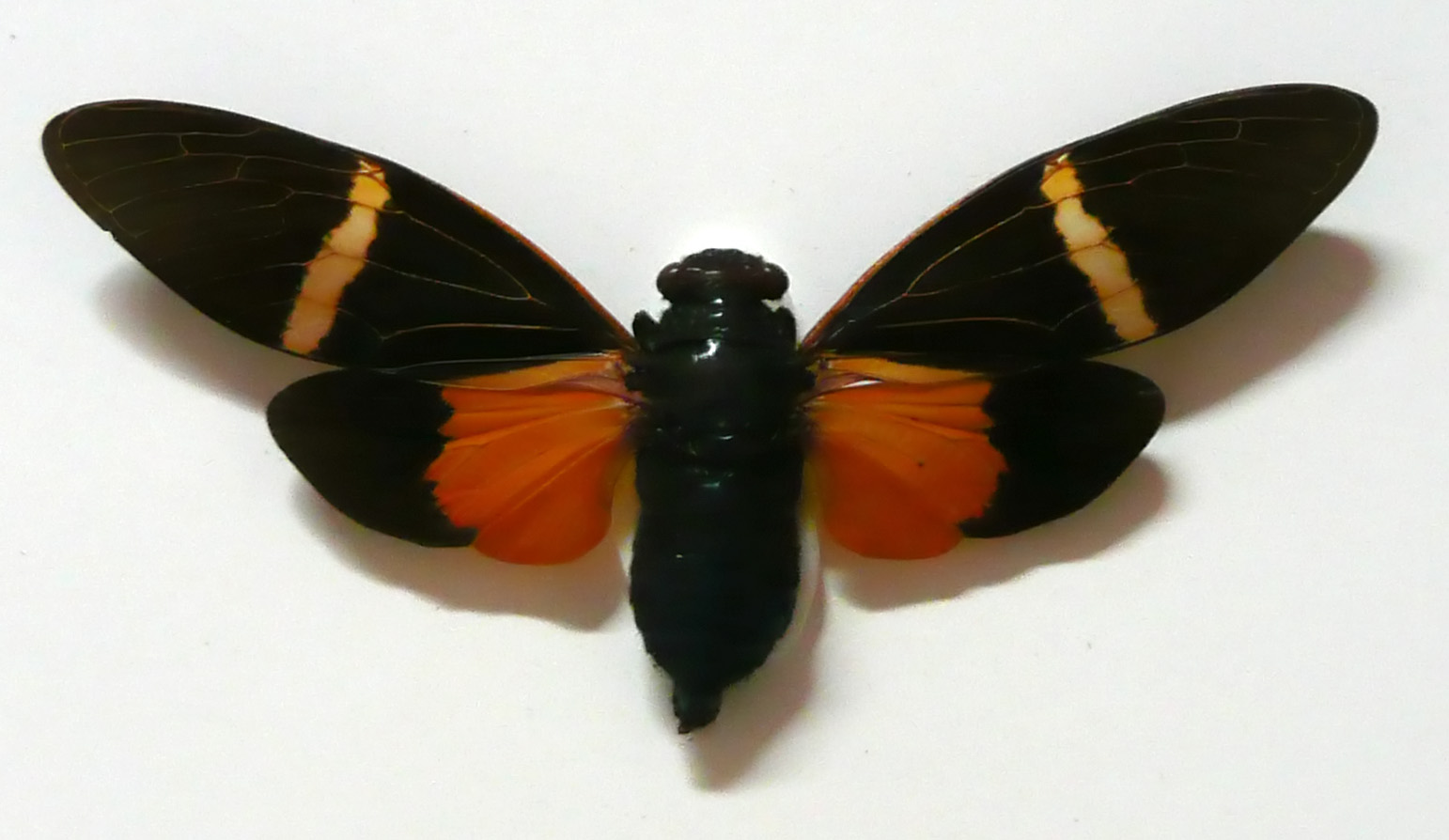
- Vittagaeana paviei

Scientific classification
- Domain: Eukaryota
- Kingdom: Animalia
- Phylum: Arthropoda
- Class: Insecta
- Order: Hemiptera
- Suborder: Auchenorrhyncha
- Family: Cicadidae
- Subfamily: Cicadinae
- Tribe: Gaeanini
- Genus: Vittagaeana; Moulds, Sarkar, Lee & Marshall, 2021

= Vittagaeana =

Genus of true bugs

Vittagaeana is a genus of Asian cicadas in the tribe Gaeanini, with species previously placed in Tosena moved by Hill et al. in 2021 within this "taxonomically unstable group of Asian cicada tribes".

== Species ==
The World Auchenorrhyncha Database includes:

1. Vittagaeana dives (Westwood, 1842) – Bangladesh, Himalayas, Hainan Is.
2. Vittagaeana paviei (Noualhier, 1896) – type species – China, Indochina

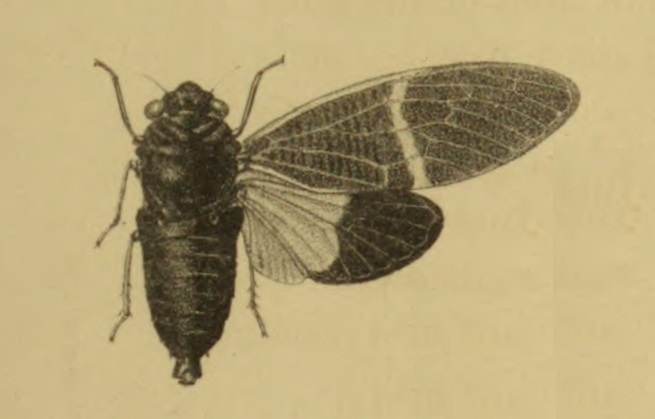
Distant's illustration of V. dives
