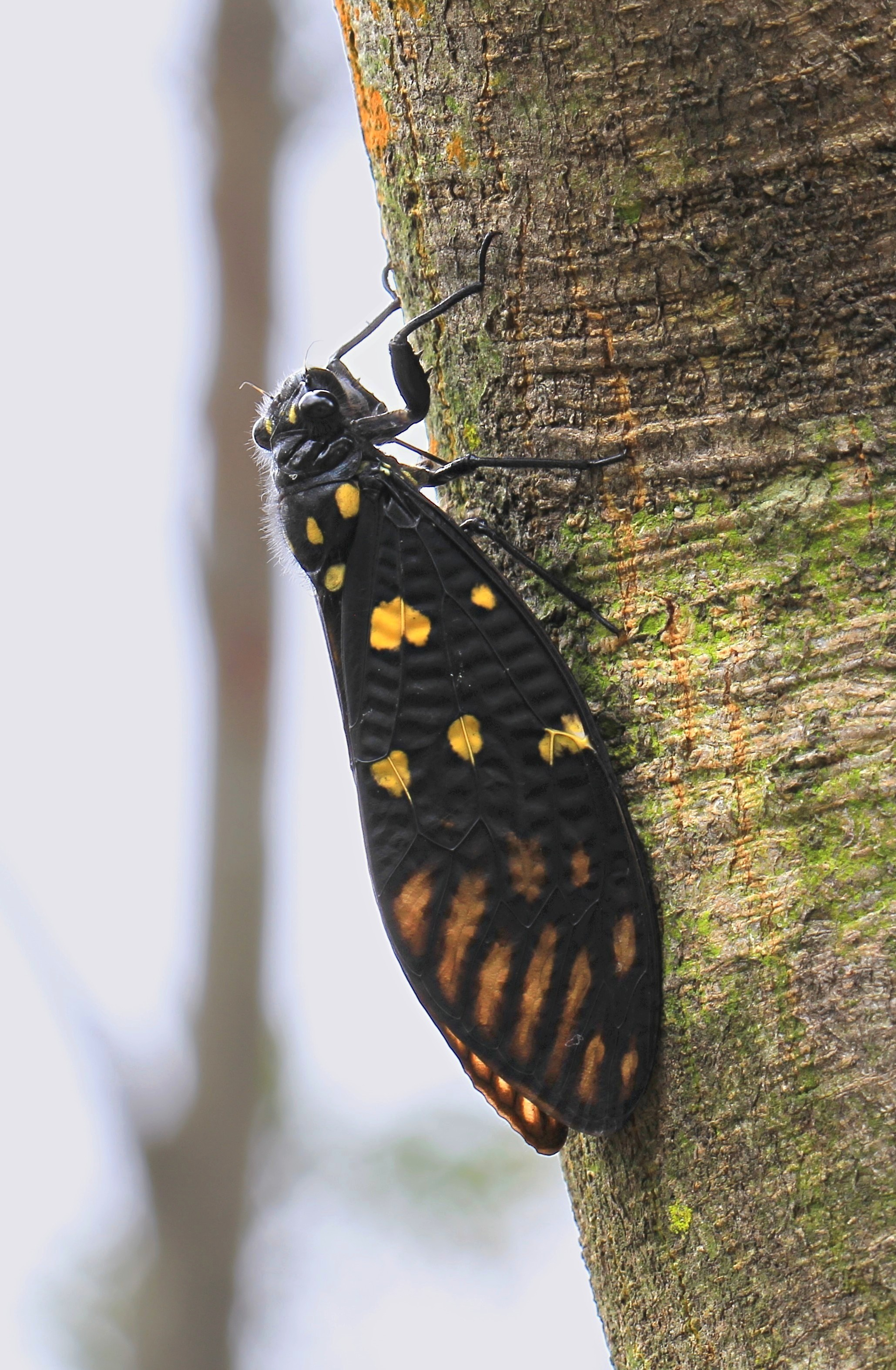
- Gaeana maculata in Kowloon

Scientific classification
- Kingdom: Animalia
- Phylum: Arthropoda
- Class: Insecta
- Order: Hemiptera
- Suborder: Auchenorrhyncha
- Family: Cicadidae
- Subfamily: Cicadinae
- Tribe: Gaeanini; Distant, 1905

Synonyms
- Talaingini Myers, 1929

= Gaeanini =

Tribe of true bugs

Gaeanini is a tribe of cicadas in the family Cicadidae, found in the eastern Palearctic and Indomalaya. There are at least 50 described species in Gaeanini.

== Genera ==
The World Auchenorrhyncha Database includes:

subtribe Gaeanina

1. Ambragaeana Chou & Yao, 1985
2. Balinta Distant, 1905
3. Callogaeana Chou & Yao, 1985
4. Gaeana Amyot & Audinet-Serville, 1843
5. Sulphogaeana Chou & Yao, 1985
6. Talainga Distant, 1890
7. Taona Distant, 1909

other genera

1. Becquartina Kato, 1940
2. Paratalainga He, 1984
3. Trengganua Moulton, 1923
4. Vittagaeana Moulds, Sarkar, Lee & Marshall, 2021
