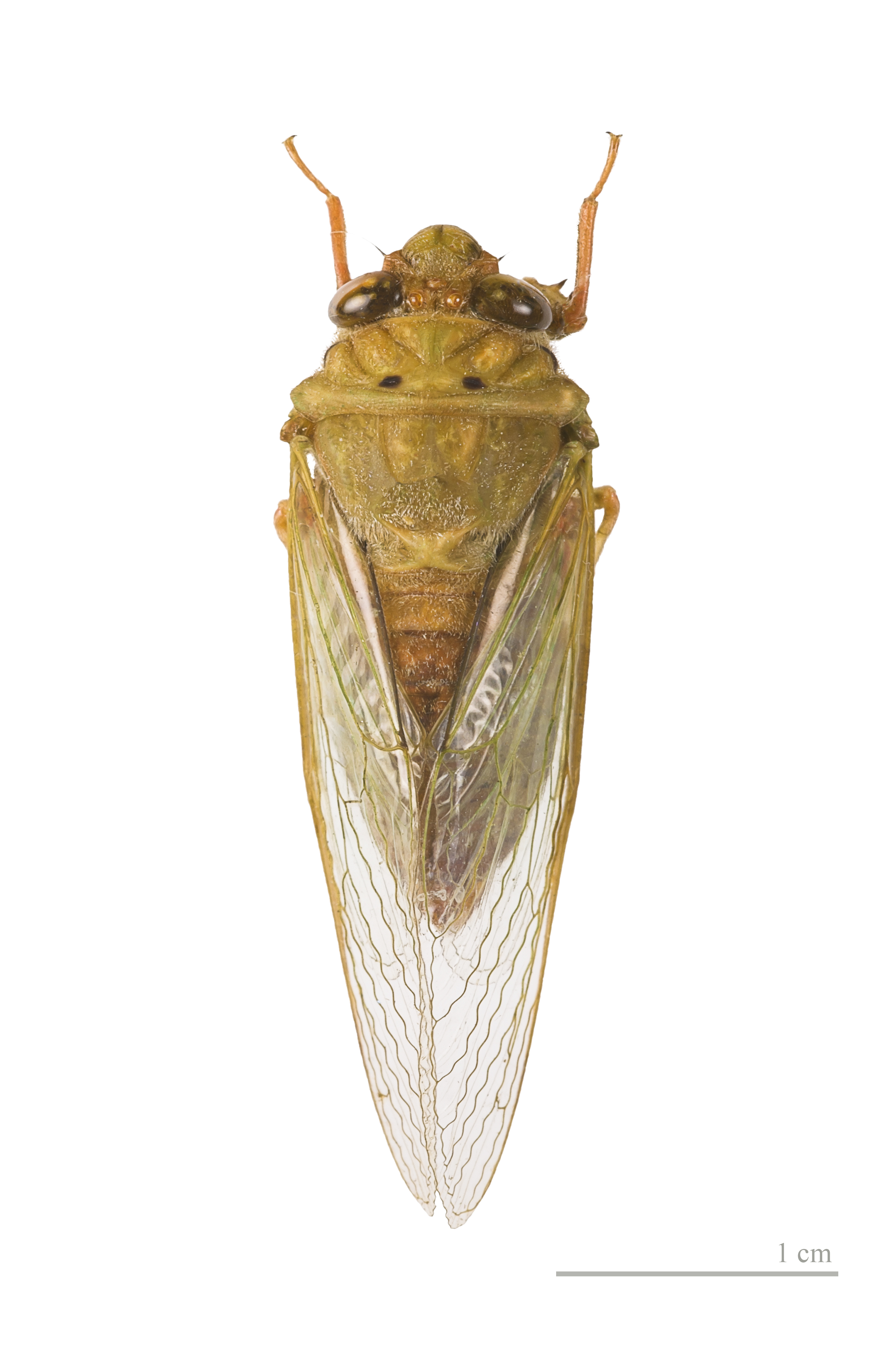
- Carineta rufescens

Scientific classification
- Kingdom: Animalia
- Phylum: Arthropoda
- Clade: Pancrustacea
- Class: Insecta
- Order: Hemiptera
- Suborder: Auchenorrhyncha
- Family: Cicadidae
- Subfamily: Cicadettinae
- Tribe: Carinetini; Distant, 1905

= Carinetini =

Tribe of true bugs

Carinetini is a tribe of cicadas in the family Cicadidae, containing at least 90 described species.

== Genera ==
These genera belong to the tribe Carinetini:

subtribe Carinetina

Authority: Distant, 1905; neotropical realm

1. Ahomana Distant, 1905^{i c g}
2. Carineta Amyot & Audinet-Serville, 1843^{i c g}
3. Guaranisaria Distant, 1905^{i c g}
4. Herrera Distant, 1905^{i c g}
5. Novemcella Goding, 1925^{i c g}
6. Paranistria Metcalf, 1952^{c g}
7. Toulgoetalna Boulard, 1982^{i c g}

subtribe Sinosenina

Authority: Boulard, 1975; Indomalayan realm

1. Karenia Distant, 1888

Data sources: i = ITIS, c = Catalogue of Life, g = GBIF, b = Bugguide.net
