= Biura =

Scientific classification
- Kingdom: Animalia
- Phylum: Arthropoda
- Class: Insecta
- Order: Hemiptera
- Suborder: Auchenorrhyncha
- Family: Cicadidae
- Subfamily: Cicadinae
- Tribe: Dundubiini
- Subtribe: Aolina
- Genus: Biura; Lee & Sanborn, 2015
- Species: B. bicolora

Binomial name
- Biura bicolora (Sanborn, 2009)

Synonyms
- Haphsa bicolora Sanborn, 2009

Monotypic genus of cicadas

Biura is a monotypic genus of Asian cicadas in the tribe Dundubiini (subtribe Aolina); it was erected by Young June Lee and Allen Sanborn in 2015; Lee named the genus from a Korean word biura, meaning 'to empty': it is a Korean imperative "to clear the mind before starting an important project".

== Species ==
The single species is Biura bicolora (Sanborn, 2009), which has been recorded from Vietnam only. Sanborn had originally placed the holotype specimen (a male that had been collected near Pleiku in 1967) in the similar and closely related genus Haphsa. The species name, meaning two colours, refers to the contrasting colours of the head, thorax and abdomen.
