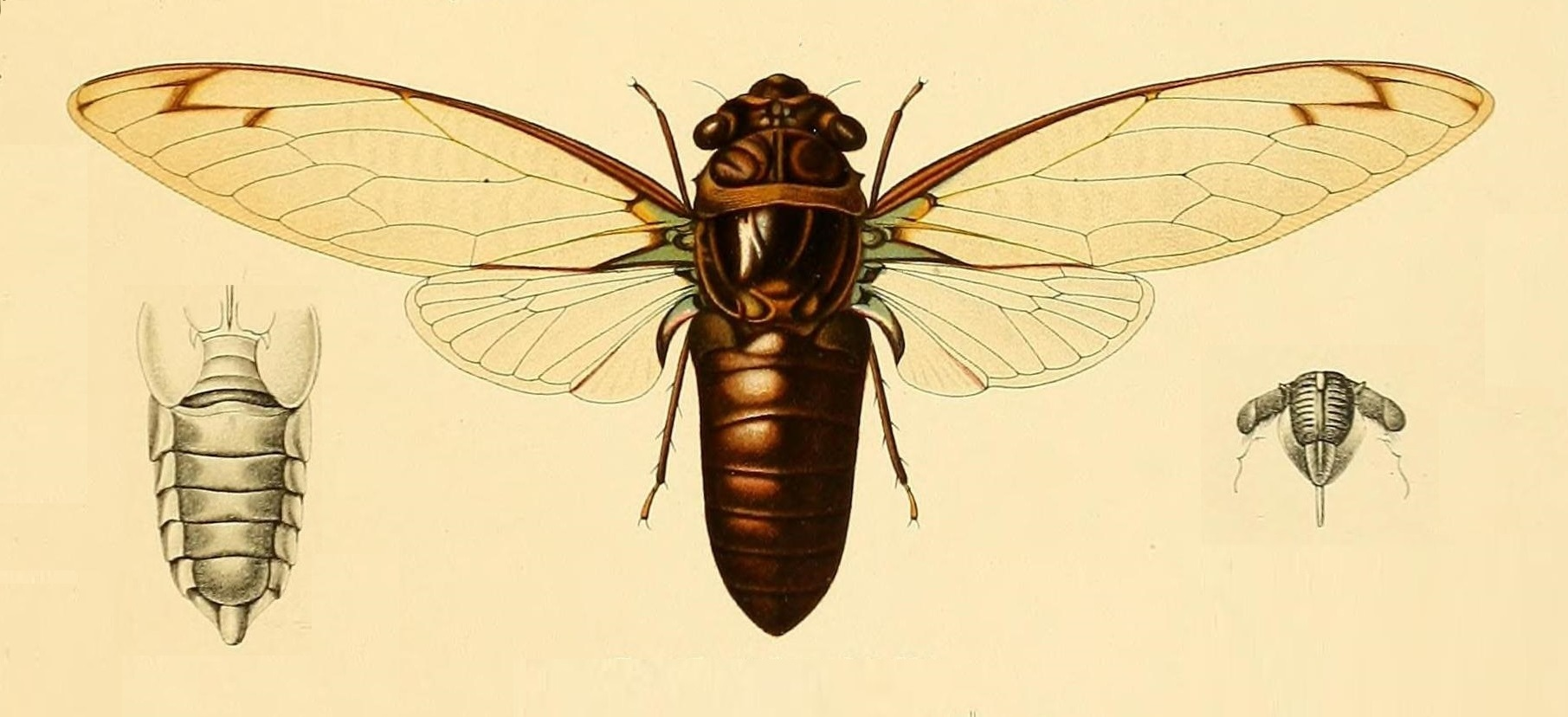
- C. viridimaculata, male

Scientific classification
- Kingdom: Animalia
- Phylum: Arthropoda
- Clade: Pancrustacea
- Class: Insecta
- Order: Hemiptera
- Suborder: Auchenorrhyncha
- Family: Cicadidae
- Subfamily: Cicadinae
- Tribe: Dundubiini
- Genus: Champaka
- Species: C. viridimaculata

Binomial name
- Champaka viridimaculata (Distant, 1889)

Synonyms
- Platylomia viridimaculata (Distant, 1889)

= Champaka viridimaculata =

Species of cicada

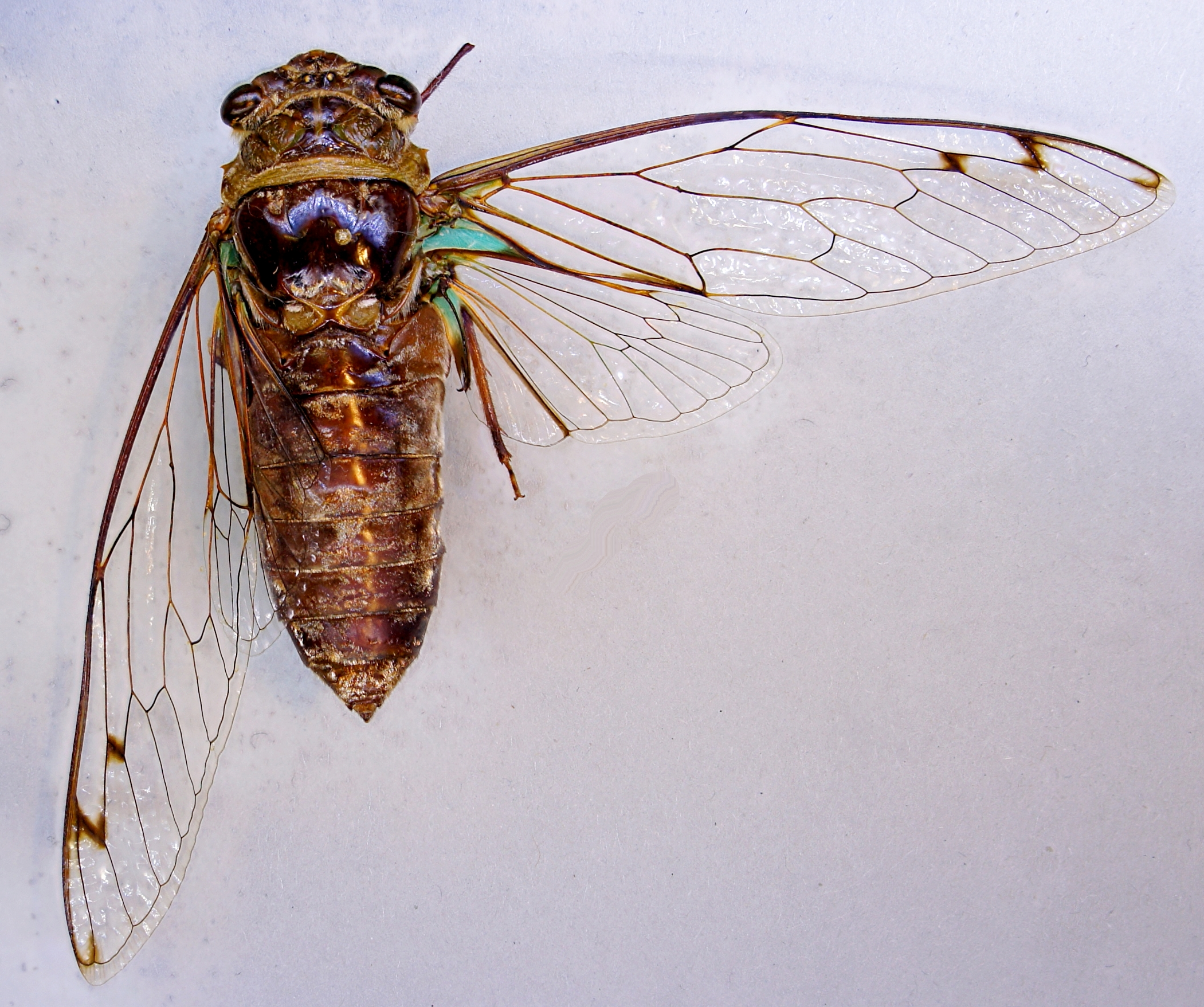
C. viridimaculata at Zoologische Staatssammlung München

Champaka viridimaculata (synonym Platylomia viridimaculata) is a cicada species from Borneo and Peninsular Malaysia.
