= Karenia =

Karenia is the scientific name of two genera of organisms and may refer to:

- Karenia (dinoflagellate), formerly included in Gymnodinium, some of which cause red tides.
- Karenia (cicada), a genus of cicada
