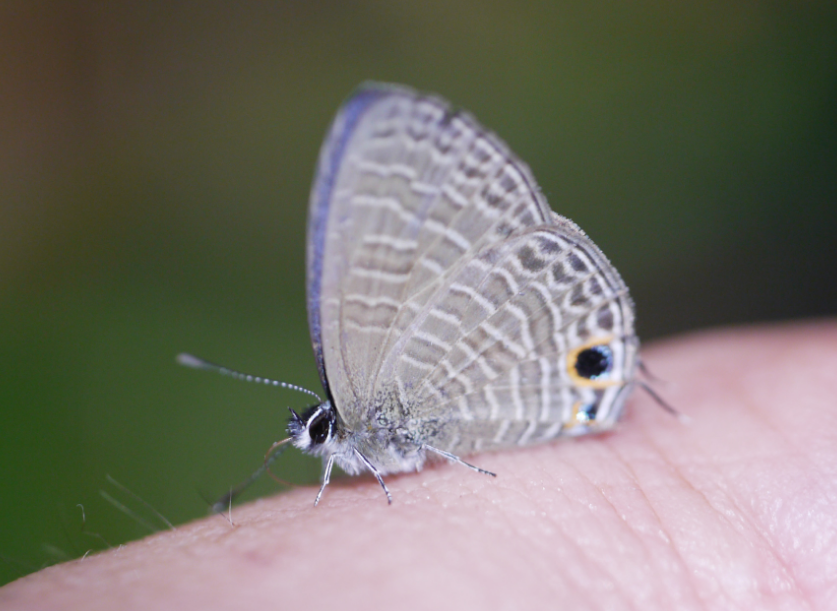
- Underside
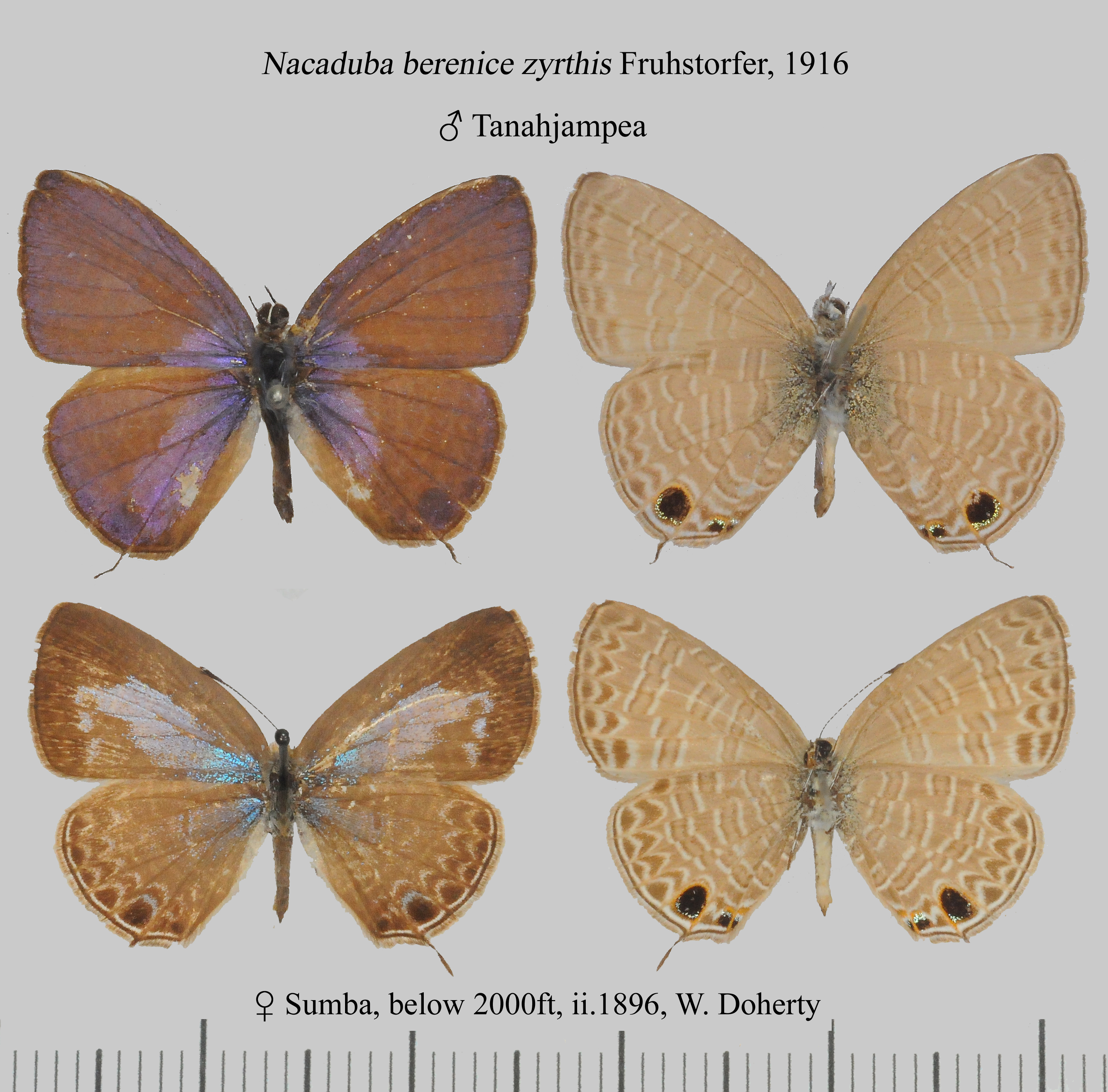
- N.berenice zyrthis Frustorfer, 1916

Scientific classification
- Kingdom: Animalia
- Phylum: Arthropoda
- Class: Insecta
- Order: Lepidoptera
- Family: Lycaenidae
- Genus: Nacaduba
- Species: N. berenice

Binomial name
- Nacaduba berenice (Herrich-Schäffer, 1869)

= Nacaduba berenice =

Rounded six-line blue

Species of butterfly

Nacaduba berenice, the rounded six-line blue, is a lycaenid butterfly found in Indomalayan realm. The species was first described by Gottlieb August Wilhelm Herrich-Schäffer in 1869.

== Description ==
=== Race plumbeomicans ===
Male upperside: dull purplish blue, in certain lights with a shining plumbeous (lead-coloured) frosting. Forewings and hindwings: black anteciliary lines and on the hindwing the black subterminal spot in interspace 2 on the underside apparent by transparency. Underside: purplish grey. Forewing: a pair of curved white lines from costa transversely across the cell to vein 1, a short similar line on the inner side of the discocellulars followed by three transverse discal similar lines from costa to vein 1, an inner and outer transverse subterminal series of slender white lunules and an anteciliary dark brown line. Hindwing: crossed transversely by three slender broken lines, with a short line on the inner side of the discocellulars between the outer two; these are followed by a discal and a postdiscal less broken and interrupted similar lines, a double series of slender white lunules and a dark anteciliary line as on the forewing. Cilia of both forewings and hindwings dark brown. Antenna black, the shafts obscurely speckled with white; head, thorax and abdomen brown, thorax and abdomen slightly purplish; beneath: palpi white fringed with long black stiff hairs, thorax and abdomen purplish grey.

Female upperside: fuscous brown, the veins prominent; an elongate oval medial patch extended from base outwards on forewing for about two-thirds of its length, dull brownish white brilliantly iridescent with metallic blue in certain lights. Hindwing: a postdiscal transverse series of slender detached white lunules, followed by a similar subterminal series of continuous lunules that encloses between it and a slender terminal white line a transverse series of black spots; these spots decrease in size anteriorly; lastly a conspicuous anteciliary black line. Underside: pale ochraceous brown; markings much as in the male, but of the transverse white lines that cross the disc of the forewing the outer one is shorter, not extended below vein 3. Antennae, head, thorax and abdomen as in the male, but the head, thorax and abdomen paler with no purple gloss.

=== Race nicobarica, Wood-Mason and de Nicéville ===
Male upperside: ground colour darker, plumbeous effulgence more striking. Underside: very dark purplish brown; markings in form and arrangement much as in the female of the typical form, but the transverse bands formed by the white lines much broader; on the hindwing the black subterminal spots in interspaces 1 and 2 much larger, conspicuously crowned inwardly and surrounded with ochraceous orange and with an outer bordering of metallic green scales; the anteciliary black line edged inwardly over the tornal area with white. Antennae, head, thorax and abdomen as in the typical form.

Female closely resembles the typical form, but differs as follows: upperside: fuscous black, the ground colour much darker than in the typical form; the pale medial patch on the forewing shot in certain lights with iridescent blue, much larger, occupying the basal posterior two-thirds of the wing, and unlike the typical form the posterior two-thirds of the hindwing. Underside: precisely as in the typical form. Antennae, head, thorax and abdomen also similar to those of the typical form. (Great Nicobar and Central Group, Nicobar Islands.)

== Distribution ==
- Sri Lanka, Peninsular India, Assam, Chittagong hill-tracts, Myanmar, Tenasserim, Mergui, the Andamans and Nicobars.
- Peninsular Malaysia, Singapore, Langkawi, Sumatra, Java, Thailand, Cambodia, Laos, Nias, Bawean, Flores, Sumba, Tanadjampea, Borneo, the Philippines, Sulawesi.
- Hong Kong
- Australia, the Bismarck Archipelago, Obi, Ambon, Serang, Aru, Aola, Guadalcanal.

== See also ==
- List of butterflies of India (Lycaenidae)
