= Sinotympana incomparabilis =

Scientific classification
- Domain: Eukaryota
- Kingdom: Animalia
- Phylum: Arthropoda
- Class: Insecta
- Order: Hemiptera
- Suborder: Auchenorrhyncha
- Family: Cicadidae
- Subfamily: Cicadinae
- Tribe: Dundubiini
- Genus: Sinotympana
- Species: S. incomparabilis

Binomial name
- Sinotympana incomparabilis Lee, 2009

Synonyms
- Haphsa incomparabilis (Lee, 2009)

Species of true bug

Sinotympana incomparabilis is a species of cicada from southern China that was discovered among a group of unidentified specimens in the Museum of Natural Sciences of Belgium in Brussels (Muséum des Sciences naturelles de Belgique). It is the type species in the genus Sinotympana, although this may be a synonym of Haphsa; it belongs to the tribe Dundubiini.
