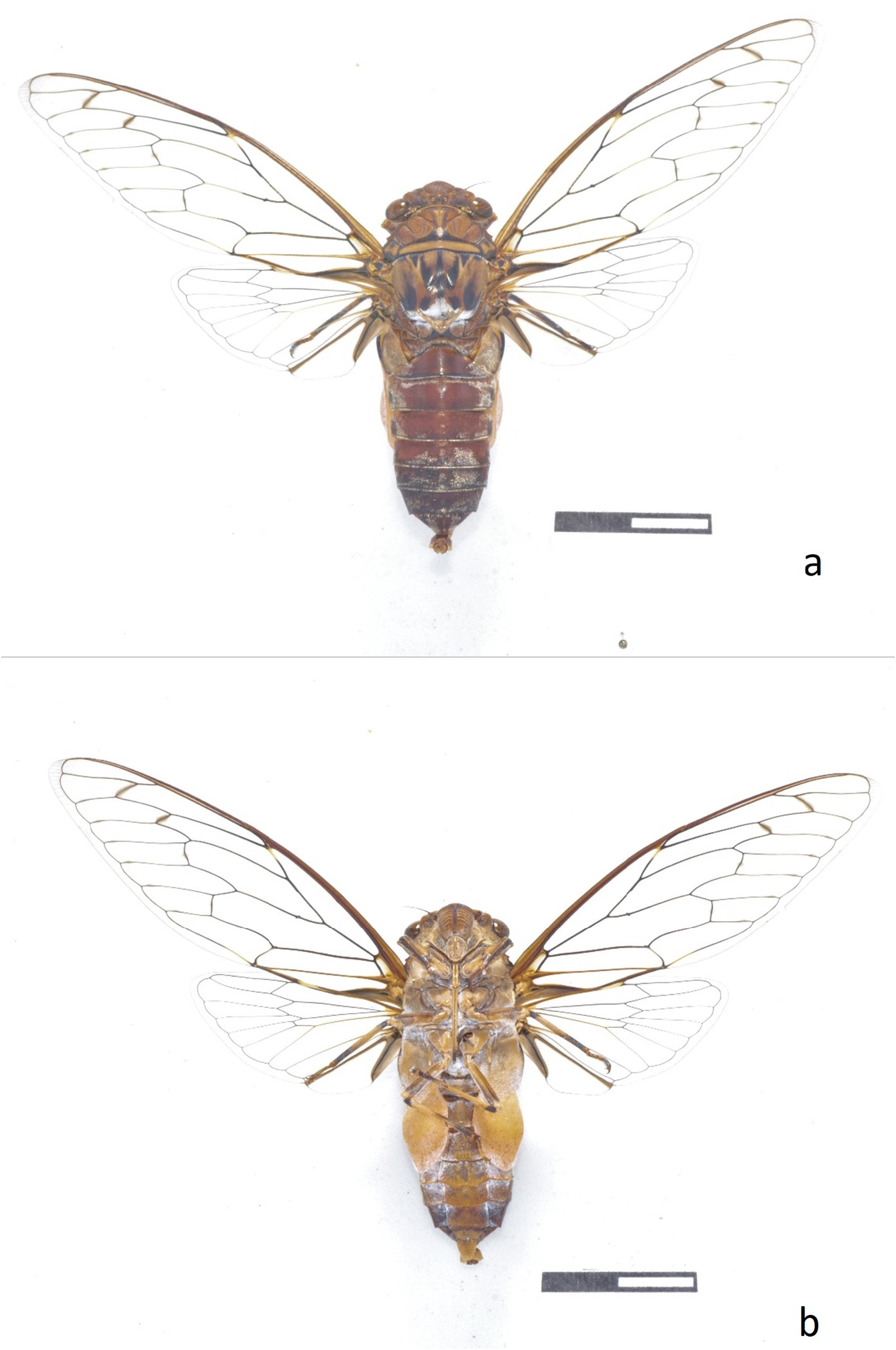
- Platylomia kohimaensis

Scientific classification
- Domain: Eukaryota
- Kingdom: Animalia
- Phylum: Arthropoda
- Class: Insecta
- Order: Hemiptera
- Suborder: Auchenorrhyncha
- Family: Cicadidae
- Tribe: Dundubiini
- Genus: Platylomia; Stål, 1870

Synonyms
- Paltylomia, Platlomia Stål, 1870: Platylonia Stål, 1870; Platytomia Stål, 1870

= Platylomia =

Genus of true bugs

Platylomia is a genus of cicadas from Southeast Asia.

== Species ==
The following are included in BioLib.cz:

1. Platylomia amicta (Distant, 1889)
2. Platylomia bivocalis (Matsumura, 1907)
3. Platylomia bocki (Distant, 1882)
4. Platylomia brevis Distant, 1912
5. Platylomia duffelsi Pham & Constant, 2014
6. Platylomia ficulnea (Distant, 1892)
7. Platylomia flavida (Guérin-Méneville, 1834) - type species (as Cicada flavida Guérin-Méneville, 1834; locality Java and Sumatra)
8. Platylomia insignis Distant, 1912
9. Platylomia kohimaensis Hajong & Limatemjen, 2021
10. Platylomia larus (Walker, 1858)
11. Platylomia lemoultii Lallemand, 1924
12. Platylomia malickyi Beuk, 1998
13. Platylomia operculata Distant, 1913
14. Platylomia pendleburyi Moulton, 1923
15. Platylomia pieli Kato, 1938
16. Platylomia plana Lei & Li, 1994
17. Platylomia radha (Distant, 1881)
18. Platylomia shaanxiensis Wang & Wei, 2014
19. Platylomia stasserae Boulard, 2005
20. Platylomia strongata Lei, 1997
21. Platylomia vibrans (Walker, 1850)

Note A number of species have been moved to the genus Champaka including:

- Platylomia spinosa (Fabricius, 1787)
- Platylomia virescens Distant, 1905
- Platylomia viridimaculata (Distant, 1889)
- Platylomia wallacei Beuk, 1999
