= Champaka =

Champaka may refer to:

- Champaka (cicada), in the tribe Dundubiini
- Magnolia champaca, a large evergreen tree of South and Southeast Asia
- Champaka Ramanayake (born 1965), Sri Lankan cricketer

== See also ==
- Champak, an Indian children's magazine
