= Meimuna boninensis =

Scientific classification
- Kingdom: Animalia
- Phylum: Arthropoda
- Clade: Pancrustacea
- Class: Insecta
- Order: Hemiptera
- Suborder: Auchenorrhyncha
- Family: Cicadidae
- Genus: Meimuna
- Species: M. boninensis

Binomial name
- Meimuna boninensis (Distant, 1905)

Synonyms
- List: Diceropyga boninensis (Walker, 1850); Cosmopsaltria ogasawarensis Matsumura, 1906; Meimuna ogasawarensis Matsumura, 1906

Species of true bug

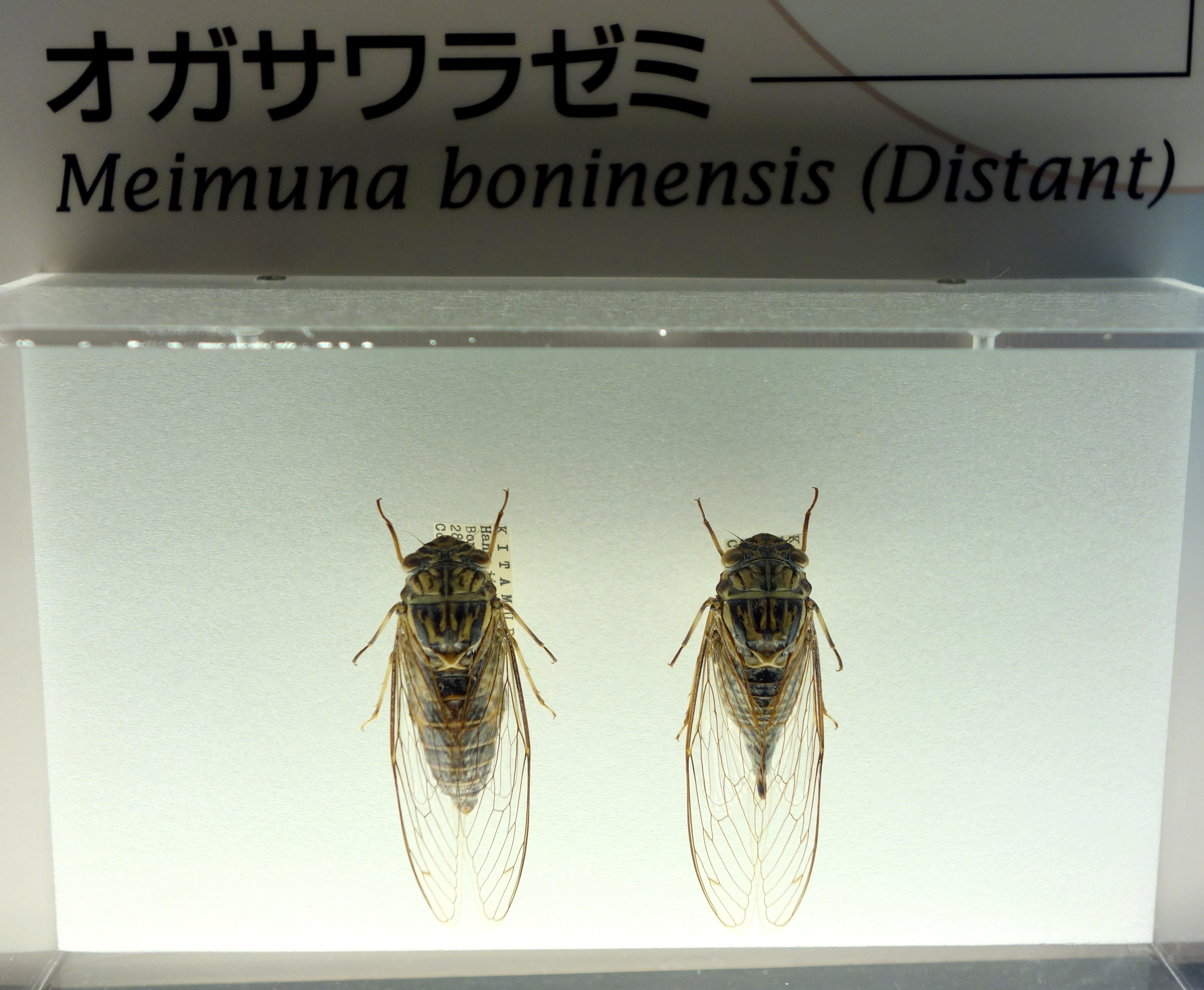
Meimuna boninensis (Distant) - National Museum of Nature and Science, Tokyo.

Meimuna boninensis is a species of cicada.

== Distribution ==
Meimuna boninensis is found in Bonin Islands, Honshu, Shikoku and Tokyo Islands.
