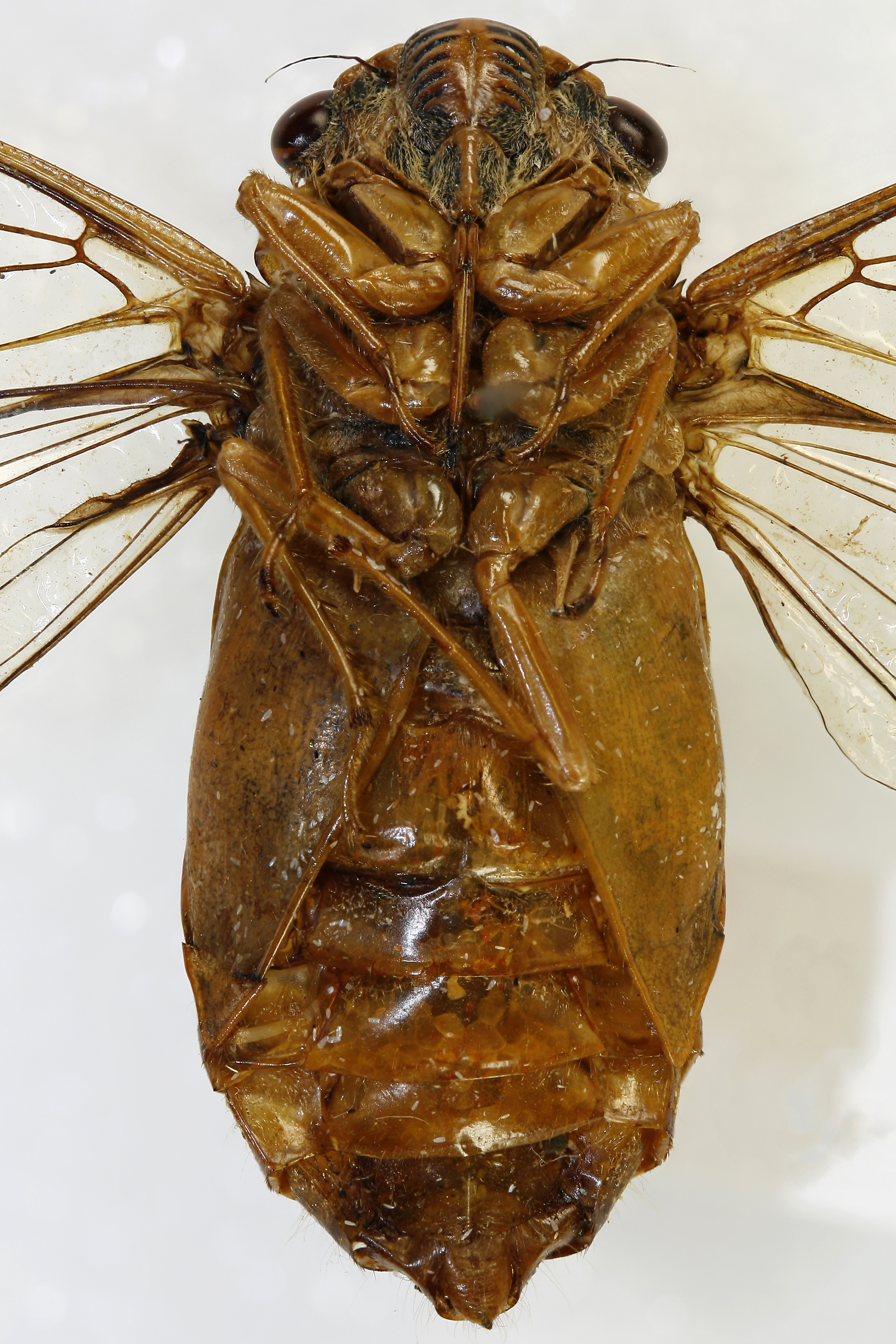
- Meimuna raxa ventral

Scientific classification
- Kingdom: Animalia
- Phylum: Arthropoda
- Clade: Pancrustacea
- Class: Insecta
- Order: Hemiptera
- Suborder: Auchenorrhyncha
- Family: Cicadidae
- Tribe: Dundubiini
- Subtribe: Aolina
- Genus: Meimuna; Distant, 1905

Synonyms
- Maimuna Distant, 1905 and other orthographic variants

= Meimuna =

Genus of true bugs

Meimuna is a genus of Asian cicadas in the tribe Dundubiini (subtribe Aolina); it was erected by William Lucas Distant in 1905. Species have been recorded from Bangladesh, Sri Lanka, China, Korea, Japan and Indochina.

== Species ==
The World Auchenorrhyncha Database includes:

1. Meimuna boninensis (Distant, 1905)
2. Meimuna bonininsulana Kato, 1928
3. Meimuna cassandra Distant, 1912
4. Meimuna chekianga Kato, 1940
5. Meimuna chekiangensis Chen, 1940
6. Meimuna choui Lei, 1994
7. Meimuna crassa (Distant, 1905)
8. Meimuna duffelsi Boulard, 2005
9. Meimuna gakokizana Matsumura, 1917
10. Meimuna gamameda (Distant, 1902)
11. Meimuna goshizana Matsumura, 1917
12. Meimuna infuscata Lei & Beuk, 1997
13. Meimuna iwasakii Matsumura, 1913
14. Meimuna khadiga (Distant, 1904)
15. Meimuna kuroiwae Matsumura, 1917
16. Meimuna microdon (Walker, 1850)
17. Meimuna mongolica (Distant, 1881)
18. Meimuna multivocalis (Matsumura, 1917)
19. Meimuna neomongolica Liu, 1940
20. Meimuna opalifera (Walker, 1850)
21. Meimuna oshimensis (Matsumura, 1906)
22. Meimuna pallida Ollenbach, 1928
23. Meimuna protopalifera Fujiyama, 1969
24. Meimuna raxa Distant, 1913
25. Meimuna silhetana (Distant, 1888)
26. Meimuna subviridissima Distant, 1913
27. Meimuna tavoyana (Distant, 1888)
28. Meimuna tripurasura (Distant, 1881) - type species (as Dundubia tripurasura Distant)
29. Meimuna velitaris (Distant, 1897)
