= Sinosemia =

Scientific classification
- Kingdom: Animalia
- Phylum: Arthropoda
- Class: Insecta
- Order: Hemiptera
- Suborder: Auchenorrhyncha
- Family: Cicadidae
- Subfamily: Cicadinae
- Tribe: Dundubiini
- Subtribe: Aolina
- Genus: Sinosemia; Matsumura, 1927
- Species: S. shirakii

Binomial name
- Sinosemia shirakii Matsumura, 1927

Synonyms
- Senosemia Matsumura, 1927 and other orthographic variants; Cryptotympana shirakii (Matsumura, 1927) in Hua, 2000; Haphsa shirakii (Matsumura, 1927) in Wang, Peng & Wei, 2021

Monotypic genus of cicadas

Sinosemia is a monotypic genus of Asian cicadas in the tribe Dundubiini (subtribe Aolina); it was originally erected by Shōnen Matsumura in 1927, but the single species has also been placed in the similar genera Cryptotympana and Haphsa, before this genus was restored in 2025. Matsumura named it after China (Latin: Sina), the Japanese: 蝉 (pronounced 'semi' meaning cicada and the suffix '-a', with the species Sinosemia shirakii.

== Distribution ==
S. shirakii has been recorded from Taiyuan and Hainan in China, Taiwan and central Vietnam.
