= Cochleopsaltria =

Scientific classification
- Kingdom: Animalia
- Phylum: Arthropoda
- Class: Insecta
- Order: Hemiptera
- Suborder: Auchenorrhyncha
- Family: Cicadidae
- Subfamily: Cicadinae
- Tribe: Dundubiini
- Genus: Cochleopsaltria; Pham & Constant, 2017

Genus of cicadas

Cochleopsaltria is a genus of Asian cicadas in the tribe Dundubiini (not assigned to any subtribe), erected by Hong Thai Pham and Jérôme Constant in 2017. When naming this genus, they referred to the shape of the opercula covering the tymbals (Latin 'cochlear' meaning spoon, Greek: κοχλίας meaning shell or twist); the suffix 'psaltria' (Latin and Greek ψαλτρία meaning 'female kithara player') is an ending for several generic names within the family Cicadidae. Species have been recorded from Vietnam and eastern China.

== Species ==
The World Auchenorrhyncha Database includes:

1. Cochleopsaltria duffelsi Pham & Constant, 2017 - type species – Thái Nguyên Province, Vietnam
2. Cochleopsaltria huboliao Wang & Liu, 2025 - eastern China
