= Sinotympana =

Scientific classification
- Domain: Eukaryota
- Kingdom: Animalia
- Phylum: Arthropoda
- Class: Insecta
- Order: Hemiptera
- Suborder: Auchenorrhyncha
- Superfamily: Cicadoidea
- Family: Cicadidae
- Subfamily: Cicadinae
- Tribe: Dundubiini
- Genus: Sinotympana; Lee, 2009

Genus of true bugs

Sinotympana is a genus of Asian cicadas in the tribe Dundubiini, subtribe Aolina; some authorities have placed species in the related genus Haphsa.

== Species ==
The World Auchenorrhyncha Database includes:

1. Sinotympana acutipetala (Wang, Peng & Wei, 2021) - Yunnan
2. Sinotympana caobangensis Pham, Sanborn, et al., 2019 - Vietnam
3. Sinotympana incomparabilis Lee, 2009 type species – southern China
