= Songga =

Scientific classification
- Kingdom: Animalia
- Phylum: Arthropoda
- Clade: Pancrustacea
- Class: Insecta
- Order: Hemiptera
- Suborder: Auchenorrhyncha
- Family: Cicadidae
- Subfamily: Cicadinae
- Tribe: Dundubiini
- Genus: Songga; Lee, 2016
- Species: S. scitula

Binomial name
- Songga scitula (Distant, 1888)

Synonyms
- Aola scitula (Distant, 1888) in Distant, 1906; Pomponia (Aola) scitula Distant, 1888; Meimuna scitula (Distant, 1888) in Lee, 2009; Haphsa scitula (Distant, 1888) in Ahmed & Sanborn, 2010

Monotypic genus of cicadas

Songga is a monotypic genus of Asian cicadas in the tribe Dundubiini (subtribe Dundubiina); it was erected by Young June Lee in 2016, who named it from the Korean: 송가 pronounced 'song-ga', meaning 'ode'.

== Species ==
The single species is Songga scitula (Distant, 1888), which William Lucas Distant had originally named Pomponia scitula, was identified from a syntype male specimen from Burma (Myanmar), deposited at the Natural History Museum, London; he named it from the Latin: 'scitula': meaning neat or elegant. This species has been recorded subsequently from India, China and elsewhere in Indochina.
