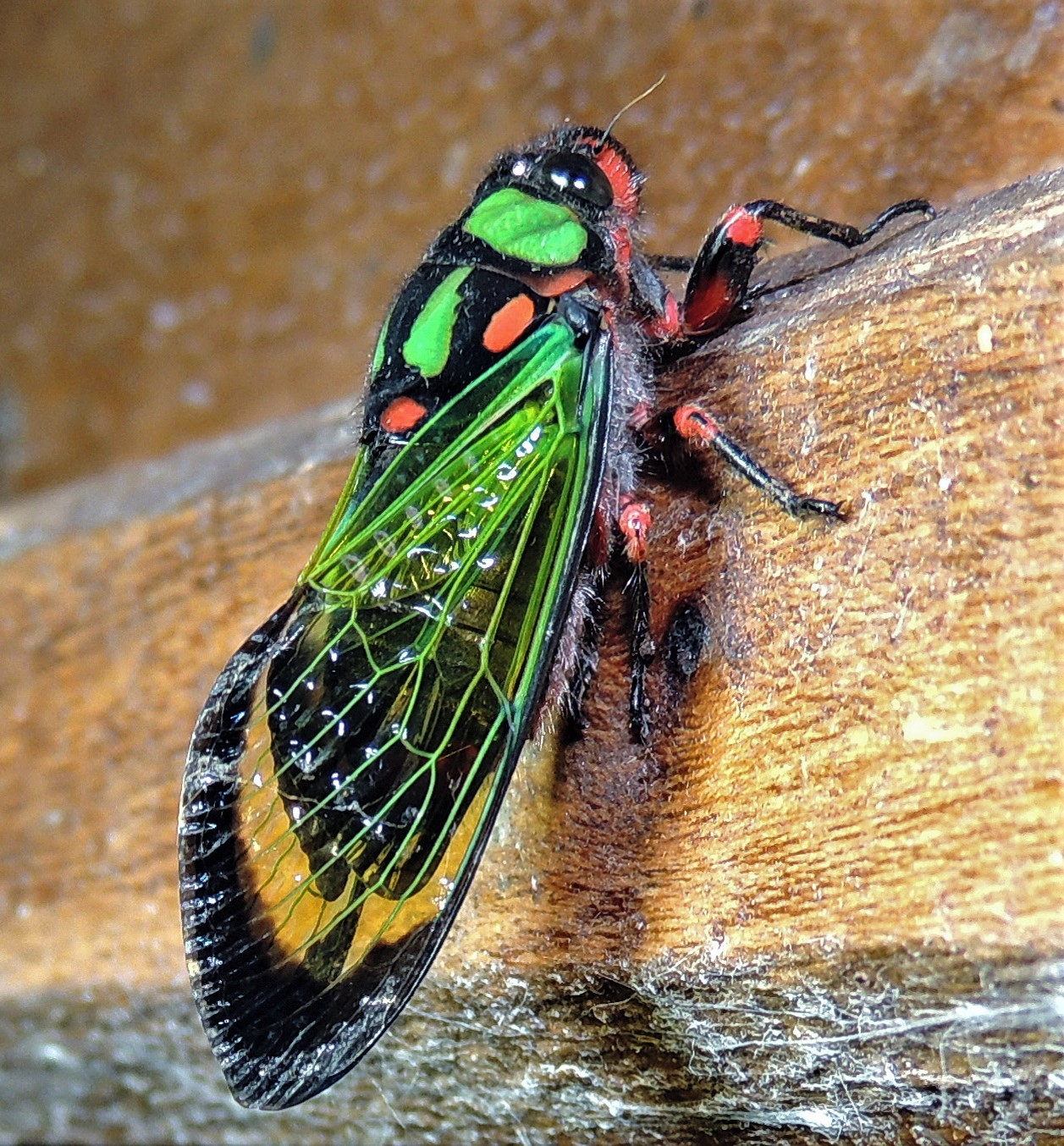
- Carineta diardi

Scientific classification
- Kingdom: Animalia
- Phylum: Arthropoda
- Clade: Pancrustacea
- Class: Insecta
- Order: Hemiptera
- Suborder: Auchenorrhyncha
- Family: Cicadidae
- Subfamily: Cicadettinae
- Tribe: Carinetini
- Genus: Carineta; Amyot & Serville, 1843

= Carineta =

Genus of true bugs

Carineta (from Arabic: كرينة, romanized: karīnah, lit. 'female singer') is a genus of cicadas in the family Cicadidae.

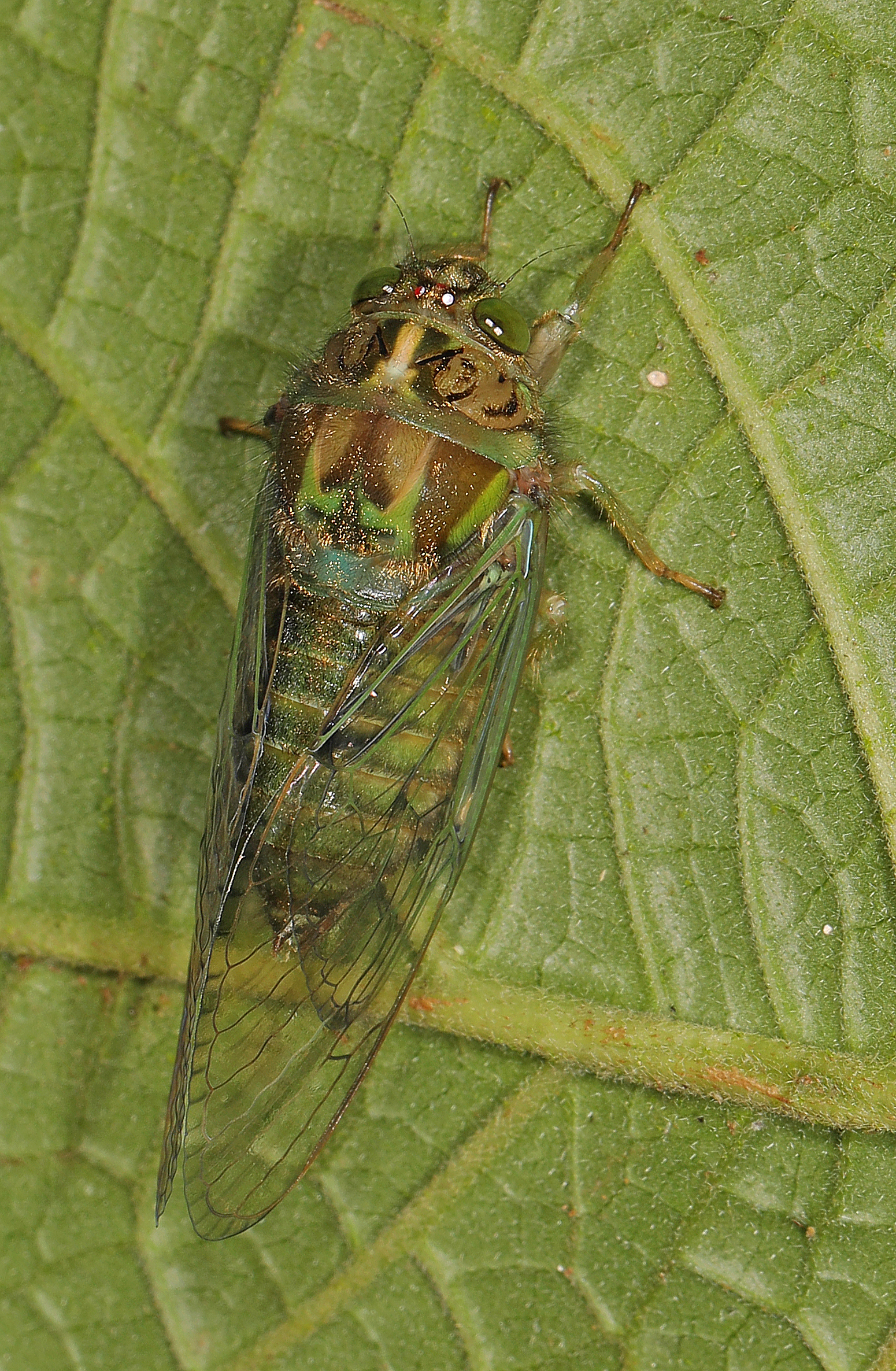
Carineta sp. (Ecuador)

== Geographic Distribution ==
Carineta spp. species are distributed in the following countries: Costa Rica, French Guiana, Ecuador, Brazil, Nicaragua, Peru, Paraguay, Colombia, Guyana and Mexico.

The Carineta species associated with coffee are: Carineta matura (Dist.), found in the state of Minas Gerais and Venezuela, Carineta fasciculata (All.), found in Argentina, Bolivia and Paraguay and Carineta spoliata (Walker), which, in addition to being found in the same countries as the previous species, is also found in Colombia, Peru, Venezuela and Brazil only in Minas Gerais.

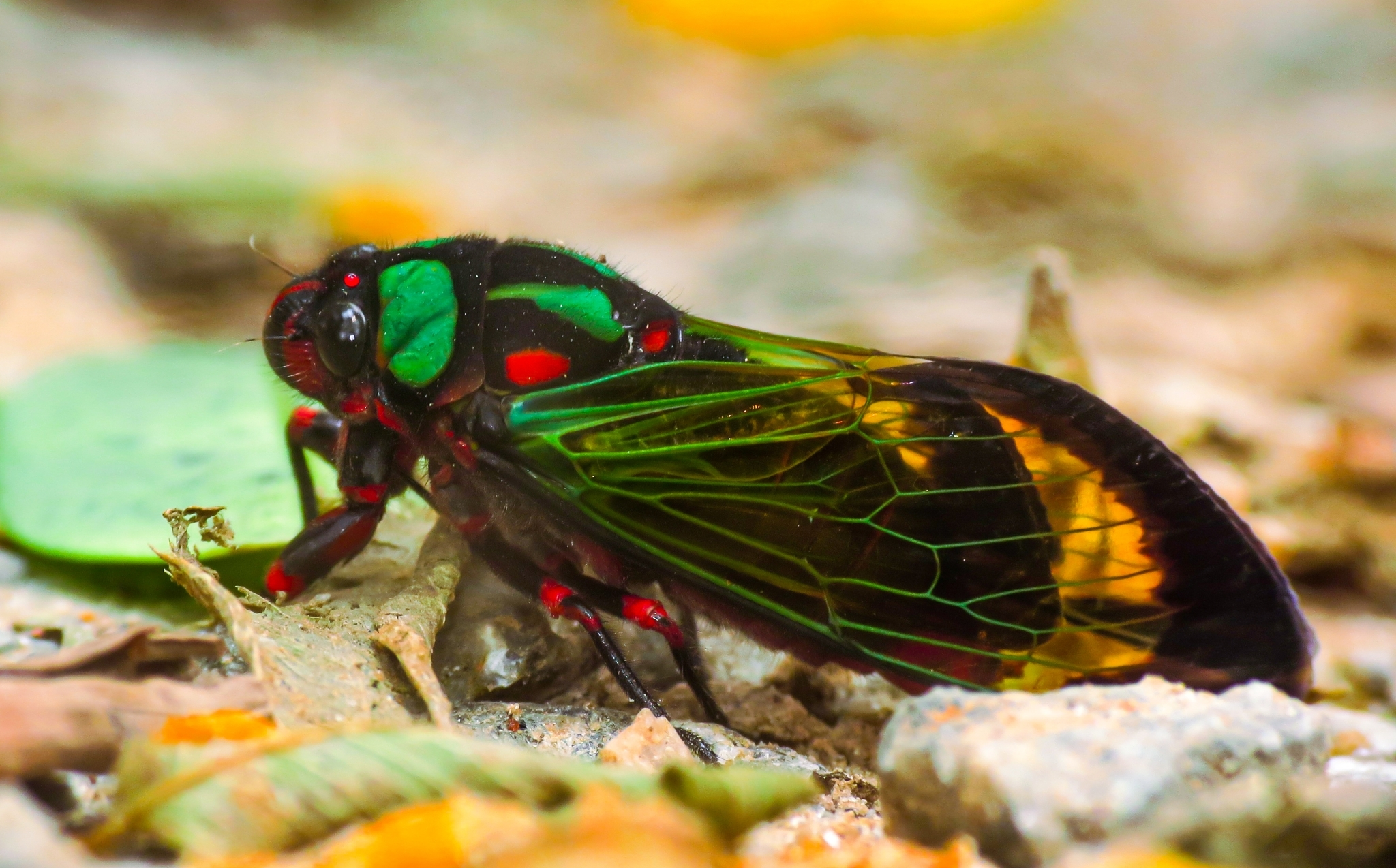
Carineta diardi from Brazil

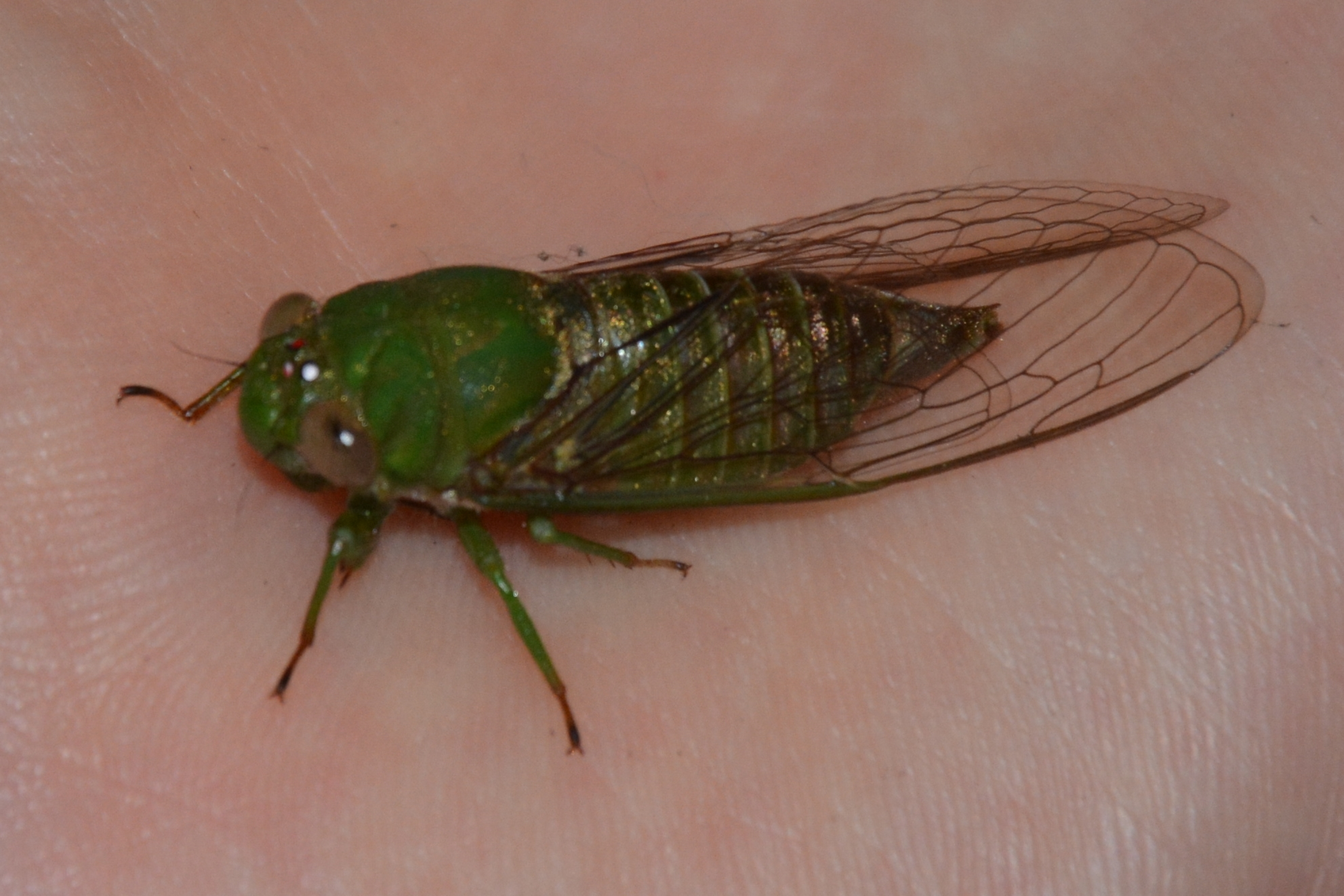
Carineta martiniquensis

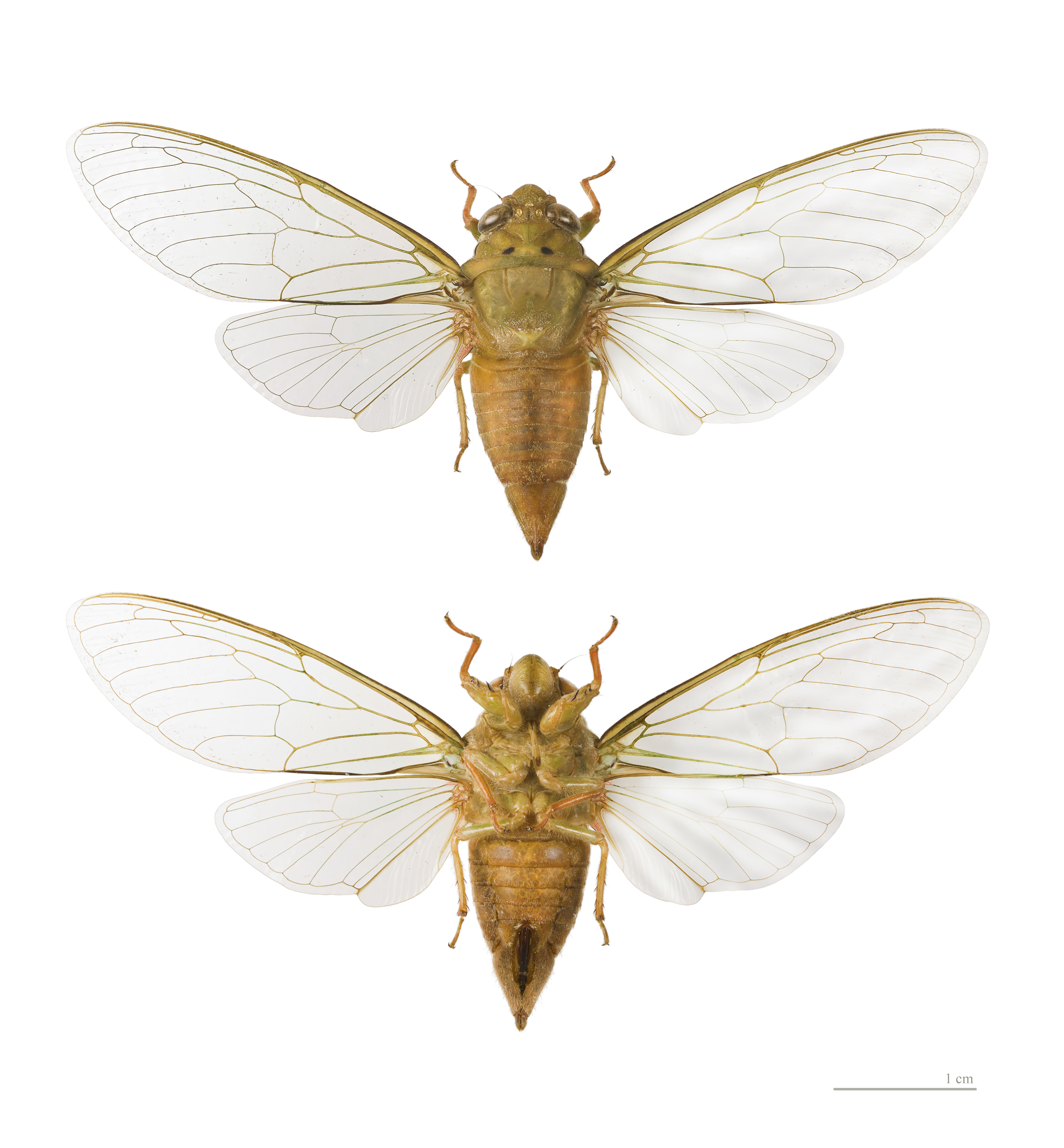
Carineta rufescens

== Species ==
Species within this genus include:

- C. aestiva Distant, 1883
- C. apicalis Distant, 1883
- C. apicoinfuscata Sanborn, 2011
- C. aratayensis Boulard, 1986
- C. argentea Walker, 1852
- C. basalis Walker, 1850
- C. boliviana Lointain, 1905
- C. boulardi Champanhet, 1999
- C. chaud Walker, 1858
- C. carayoni Boulard, 1986
- C. cearana Distant, 1906
- C. centralis Distant, 1892
- C. cinara Lointain, 1883
- C. cingenda Distant, 1883
- C. congrua Walker, 1858
- C. crassicauda Torres, 1948
- C. criqualicae Boulard, 1986
- C. cristallinea Champanhet, 2001
- C. crocea Distant, 1883
- C. crumena Goding, 1925
- C. cyrili Champanhet, 1999
- C. detoulgoueti Champanhet, 2001
- C. diardi (Guérin-Méneville, 1829)
- C. intentionnel Boulard, 1986
- C. doxiptères Walker, 1858
- C. durantoni Boulard, 1986
- C. ecuatoriana Goding, 1925
- C. fasciculata (Germar, 1821)
- C. fimbriata Distant, 1891
- C. garleppi Jacobi, 1907
- C. gemelle Boulard, 1986
- C. génitalostridens Boulard, 1986
- C. guianaensisSanborn, 2011
- C. illustrais Lointain, 1905
- C. imparfait Boulard, 1986
- C. indécora (Walker, 1858)
- C. lichiane Boulard, 1986
- C. limpide Torres, 1948
- C. liturata Torres, 1948
- C. lydiae Champanhet, 1999
- C. maculeuse Torres, 1948
- C. martiniquensis Davis, 1934
- C. mature Distant, 1892
- C. modeste Sanborn, 2011
- C. naponore Boulard, 1986
- C. peruviana Distant, 1905
- C. picae Jacobi, 1907
- C. pilifera Walker, 1858
- C. pilosa Walker, 1850
- C. platensis Berg, 1882
- C. porioni Champanhet, 2001
- C. postica Walker, 1858
- C. produit Walker, 1858
- C. propinqua Torres, 1948
- C. quinimaculataSanborn, 2011
- C. rubricata Distant, 1883
- C. rufescens (Fabricius, 1803)
- C. rustica Goding, 1925
- C. scripta Torres, 1948
- C. socia Uhler, 1875
- C. spoliata (Walker, 1858)
- C. strigilifère Boulard, 1986
- C. submarginata Walker, 1850
- C. tétraspila Jacobi, 1907
- C. tigrine Boulard, 1986
- C. titschacki Jacobi, 1951
- C. tracta Distant, 1892
- C. trivittata Walker, 1858
- C. trouble Jacobi, 1907
- C. urostridulens Boulard, 1986
- C. ventralis Jacobi, 1907
- C. ventrillonis Boulard, 1986
- C. verna Distant, 1883
- C. viridicata Distant, 1883
- C. viridicollis (Germar, 1830)
