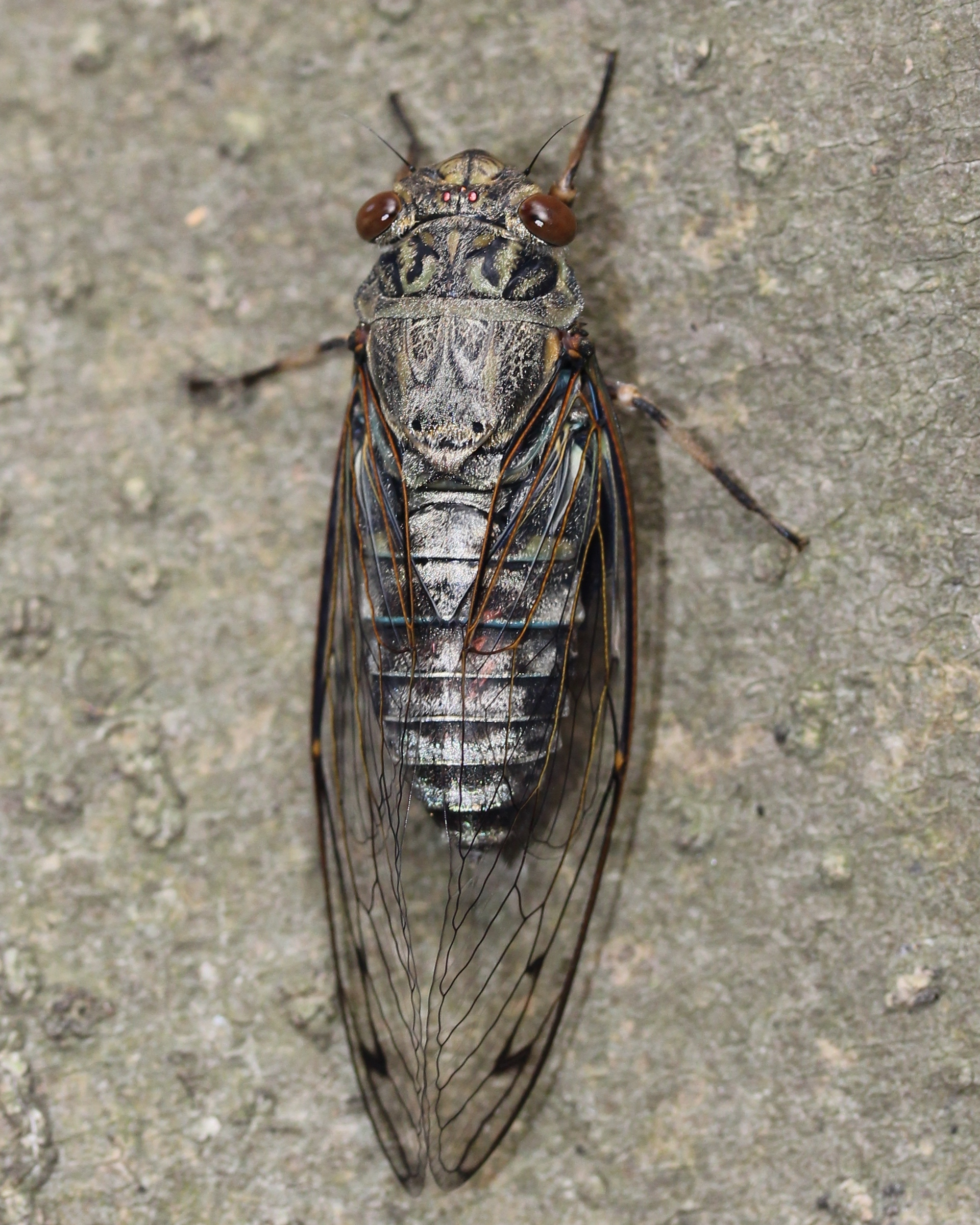
- Male in Aichi Prefecture, Japan

Scientific classification
- Kingdom: Animalia
- Phylum: Arthropoda
- Class: Insecta
- Order: Hemiptera
- Suborder: Auchenorrhyncha
- Family: Cicadidae
- Genus: Meimuna
- Species: M. opalifera

Binomial name
- Meimuna opalifera (Walker, 1850)

Synonyms
- List: Cosmopsaltria opalifera (Walker, 1850); Dundubia opalifera Walker, 1850; Meimuna longipennis Kato, 1937; Meimuna opalifera subsp. longipennis Kato, 1937; Meimuna opalifera var. formosana Kato, 1925; Meimuna opalifera var. nigroventris Kato, 1927; Meimuna opalifera var. punctata Kato, 1932; Meimuna opaliferia Walker, 1850; Meimuna operlifera Walker, 1850; Meimuna oplifera Walker, 1850; Meimura oparifera Walker, 1850

= Sinfonia opalifera =

Species of true bug

Sinfonia opalifera, known commonly as Walker's cicada or the elongate cicada, is a species of cicada native to China, Japan, Taiwan, and the Korean Peninsula. It emerges in July and is no longer seen by about October. It is also known in Japan as tsuku-tsuku-bōshi (ツクツクボウシ), named after its distinctive call.

== Description ==
Male Sinfonia opalifera grow to about 42 to 46 mm (1.7 to 1.8 in), while females reach about 40 to 44 mm (1.6 to 1.7 in).

== Distribution ==
Sinfonia opalifera is found in China, Japan, the Korean Peninsula, and Taiwan.

== Life cycle ==
The typical life cycle, from egg to natural adult death, is around two years. However, it may range from two to five years.

== Gallery ==
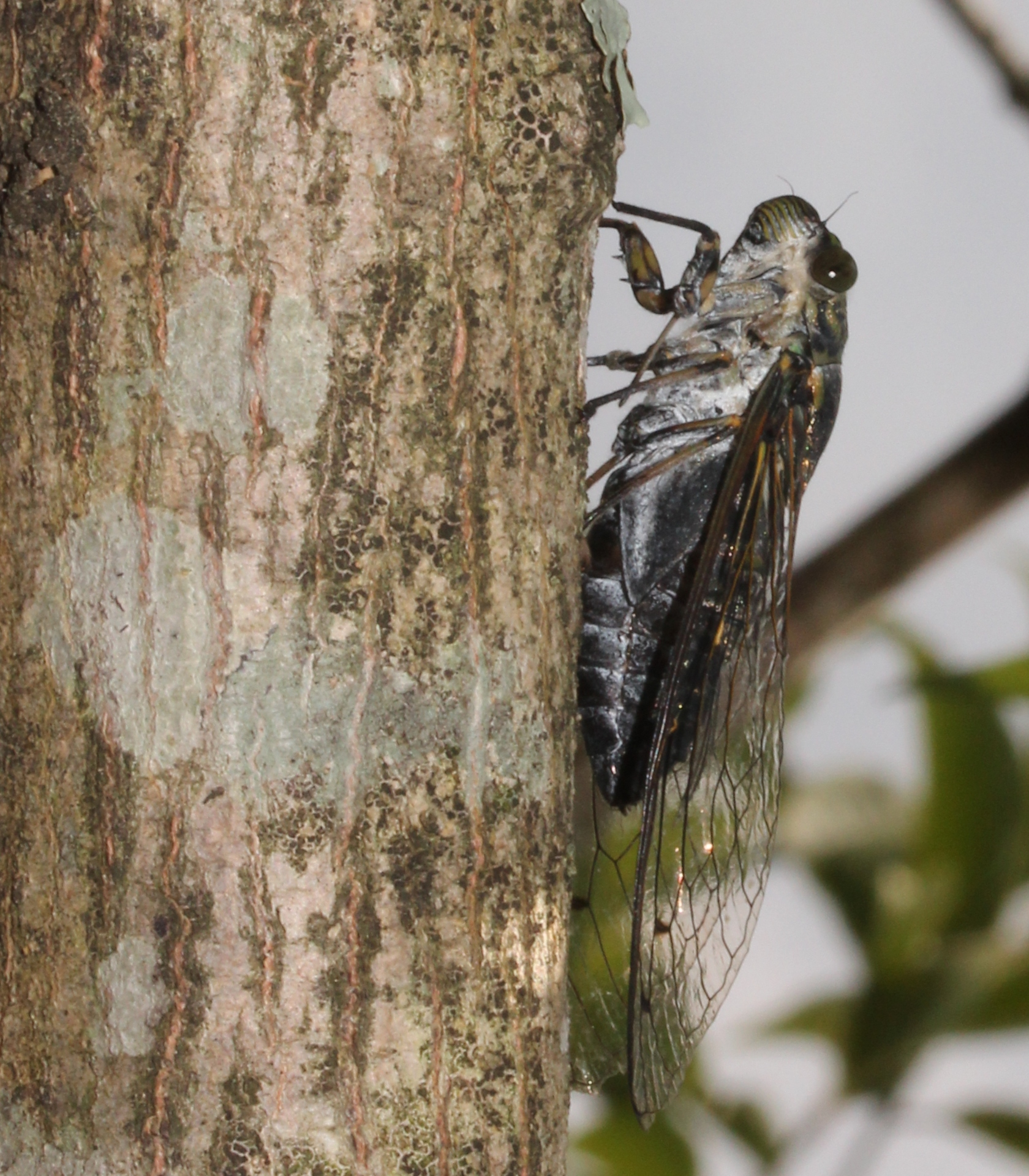
Male in Shiga Prefecture, Japan

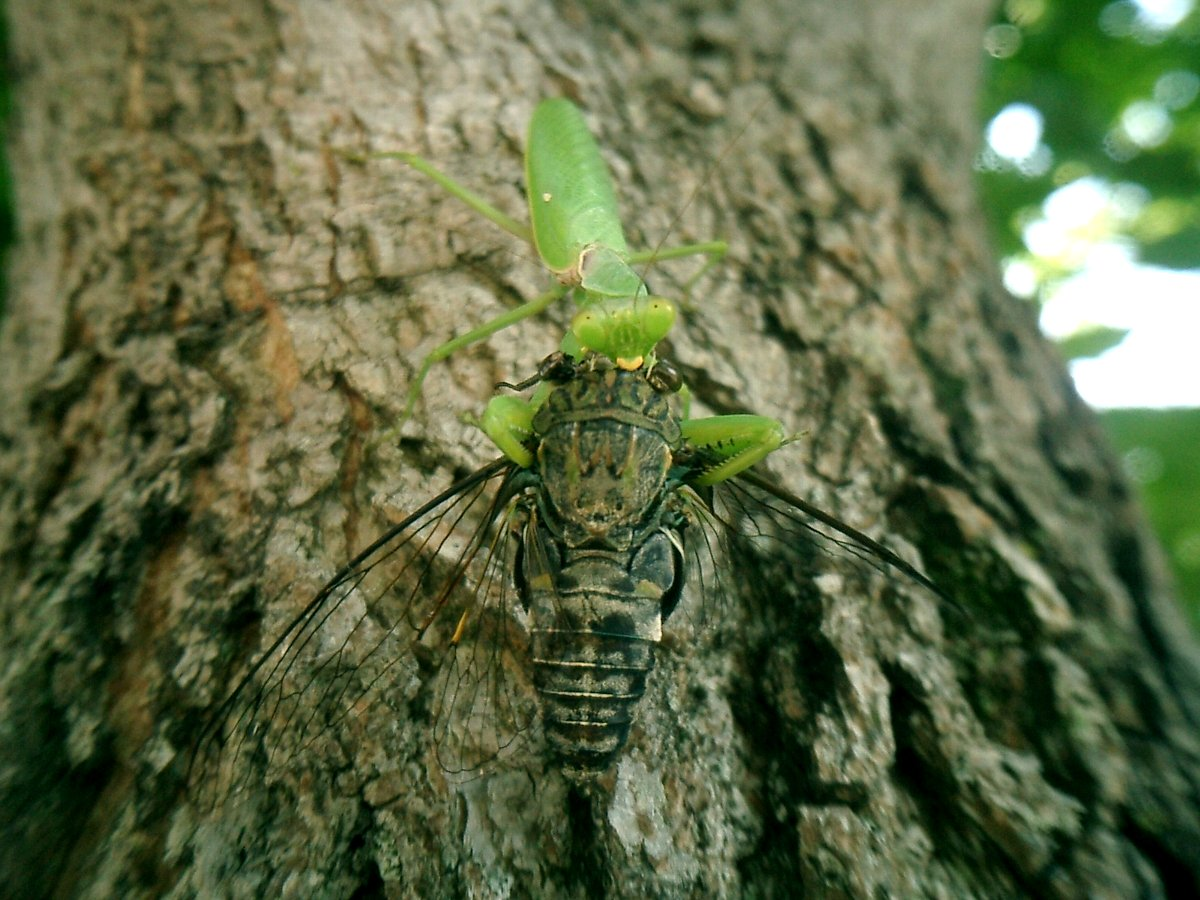
Meimuna opalifera preyed upon by a giant Asian mantis (Hierodula patellifera)

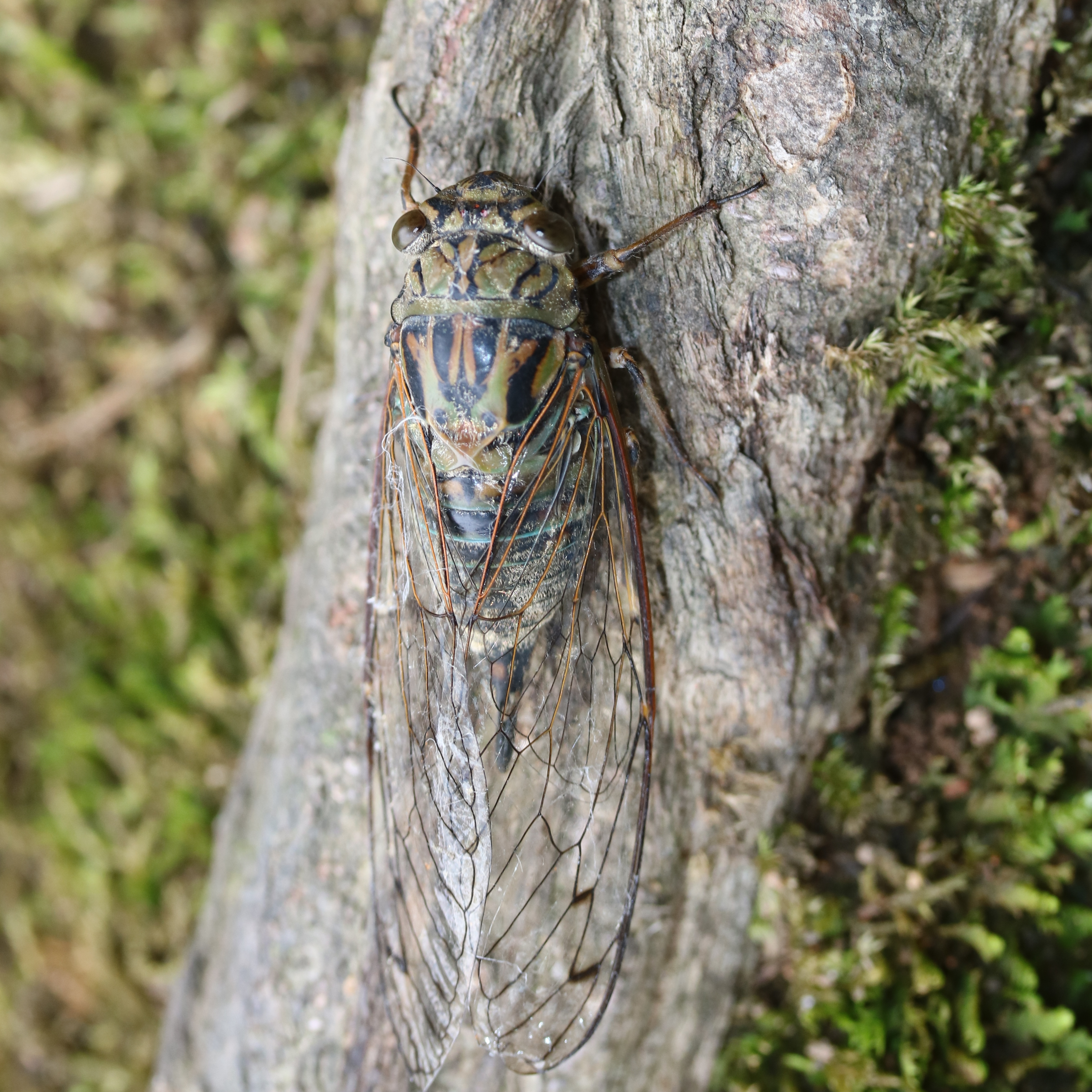
Female in Fukui Prefecture, Japan
