= Herrera (cicada) =

Scientific classification
- Kingdom: Animalia
- Phylum: Arthropoda
- Clade: Pancrustacea
- Class: Insecta
- Order: Hemiptera
- Suborder: Auchenorrhyncha
- Family: Cicadidae
- Tribe: Carinetini
- Genus: Herrera; Distant, 1905

Genus of true bugs

Herrera is a genus of cicadas in the family Cicadidae. There are about seven described species in Herrera.

== Species ==
These seven species belong to the genus Herrera:

- Herrera ancilla (Stål, 1864)^{i c g}
- Herrera coyamensis Sanborn, 2007^{i c g}
- Herrera humilastrata Sanborn & Heath, 2014^{c g}
- Herrera infuscata Sanborn, 2009^{i c g}
- Herrera laticapitata Davis, 1938^{i c g}
- Herrera lugubrina (Stål, 1864)^{i c g}
- Herrera umbraphila Sanborn & Heath, 2014^{c g}

Data sources: i = ITIS, c = Catalogue of Life, g = GBIF, b = Bugguide.net
