= Meimuna bonininsulana =

Scientific classification
- Domain: Eukaryota
- Kingdom: Animalia
- Phylum: Arthropoda
- Class: Insecta
- Order: Hemiptera
- Suborder: Auchenorrhyncha
- Family: Cicadidae
- Genus: Meimuna
- Species: M. bonininsulana

Binomial name
- Meimuna bonininsulana (Kato, 1928)

Synonyms
- List: Meimuna bonin-insulana (Kato, 1928)

Species of true bug

Meimuna bonininsulana is a species of cicada.

== Distribution ==
Meimuna bonininsulana is found in Tokyo Islands.
