= Haphsa =

Scientific classification
- Kingdom: Animalia
- Phylum: Arthropoda
- Clade: Pancrustacea
- Class: Insecta
- Order: Hemiptera
- Suborder: Auchenorrhyncha
- Family: Cicadidae
- Subfamily: Cicadinae
- Tribe: Dundubiini
- Genus: Haphsa; Distant, 1905

Synonyms
- Hapsha Distant, 1905; Senosemia Matsumura, 1927; Sinosemia Matsumura, 1927 and other orthographic variants

Genus of true bugs

External image
- Images at iNaturalist

Haphsa is a genus of Asian cicadas in the tribe Dundubiini (subtribe Aolina); it was erected by William Lucas Distant in 1905. There appears to be disagreement about the placement of certain species; records of distribution are from India, China through to Indochina.

== Species ==
The World Auchenorrhyncha Database includes:

1. Haphsa apicoinfuscata Sanborn, 2013
2. Haphsa conformis Distant, 1917
3. Haphsa corta Lee, 2025
4. Haphsa dianensis Chou, Lei, Li, Lu & Yao, 1997
5. Haphsa durga (Distant, 1881)
6. Haphsa fratercula Distant, 1917
7. Haphsa karenensis Ollenbach, 1928
8. Haphsa lueta Wang, Yang & Wei, 2015
9. Haphsa nana Distant, 1913
10. Haphsa nicomache (Walker, 1850)
  – type species (as Dundubia nicomache Walker, 1850) - Indian subcontinent
11. Haphsa opercularis Distant, 1917 - Yunnan, Laos, Vietnam

The Global Biodiversity Information Facility may also include the species names:

now placed in restored genus Aola Distant, 1905

1. Haphsa bindusara (Distant, 1881)

now placed in genus Changa Lee, 2016

1. Haphsa jsguillotsi (Boulard, 2005)
2. Haphsa sita (Distant, 1881)

now placed in Sinotympana

1. Haphsa acutipetala Wang, Peng & Wei, 2021
2. Haphsa caobangensis (Pham & Sanborn, 2019)
3. Haphsa incomparabilis (Lee, 2009)

best placed in Sinosemia

1. Haphsa shirakii (Matsumura, 1927)
