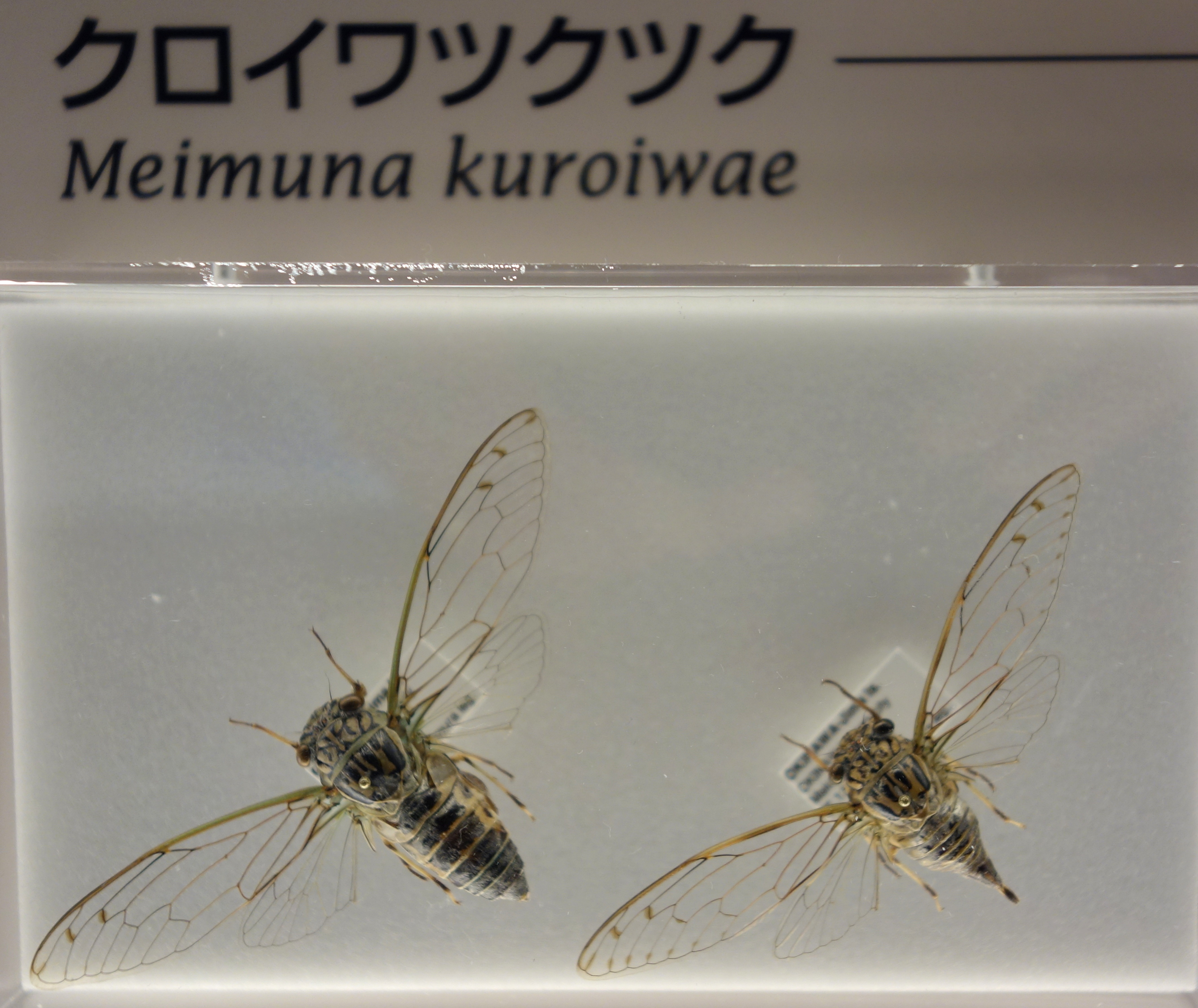

Scientific classification
- Domain: Eukaryota
- Kingdom: Animalia
- Phylum: Arthropoda
- Class: Insecta
- Order: Hemiptera
- Suborder: Auchenorrhyncha
- Family: Cicadidae
- Genus: Meimuna
- Species: M. kuroiwae

Binomial name
- Meimuna kuroiwae Matsumara, 1917

= Meimuna kuroiwae =

Species of true bug

Meimuna kurowae is a species of cicada in the family Cicadidae found in Japan.

== Description ==
This cicada is allied to Meimuna ogasawarensis, from which it differs slightly in appearance. M. kurowae has a smaller, less prominent face with a black stripe in the middle, and more distinctly narrow opercula. Its tibia is tinted brown at the apex, its tegmina is narrower, and its genital plate is dark-colored. Excluding the tegmina, the males are approximately 29 mm long, while the females are 32–35 mm long.

== Habitat ==
M. kurowae is found on the Ryukyu Islands.

== Life cycle ==
The median life cycle, from egg to natural adult death, is approximately two years, but can range from two to four years.
