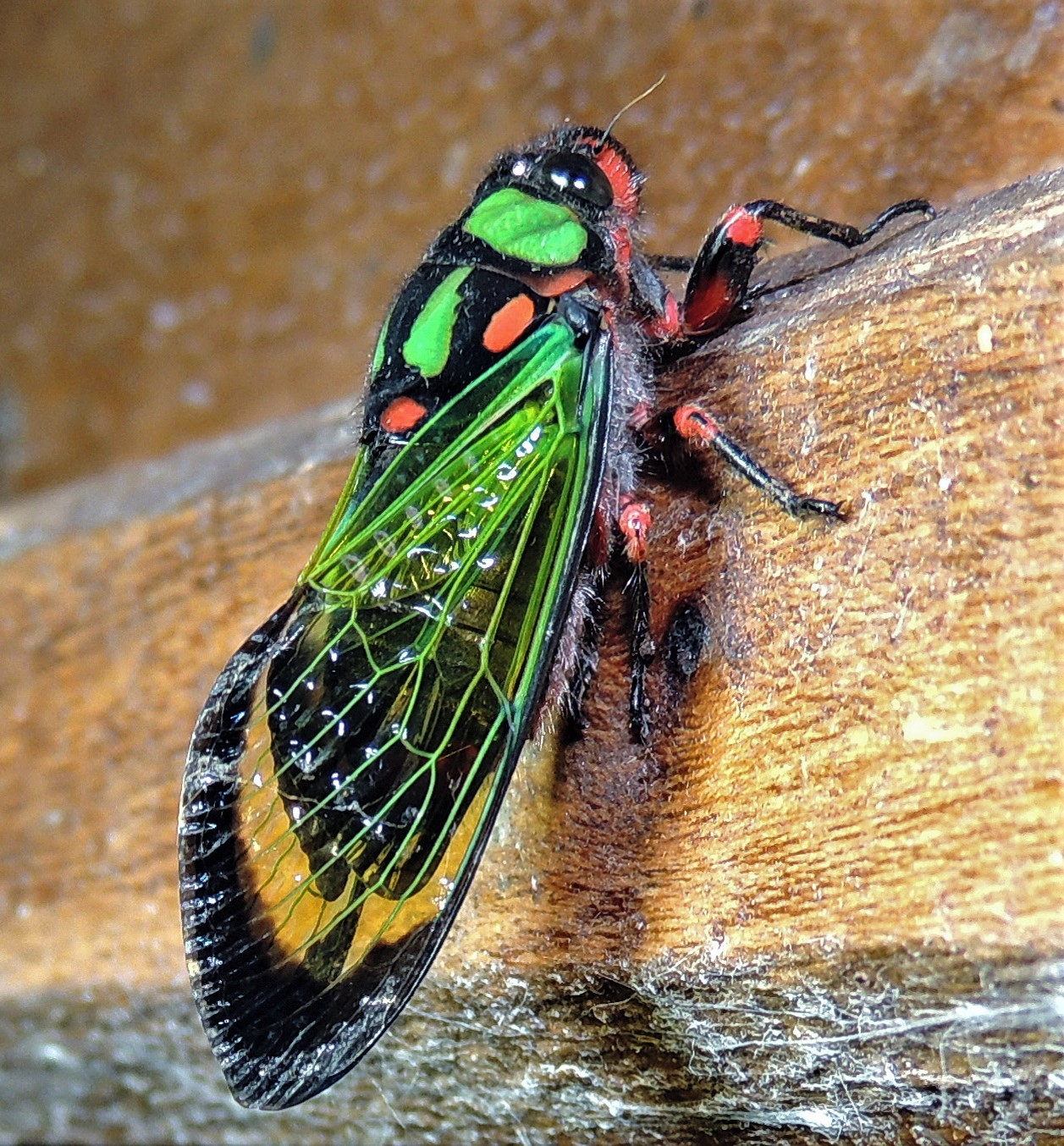
- In Argentina

Scientific classification
- Kingdom: Animalia
- Phylum: Arthropoda
- Clade: Pancrustacea
- Class: Insecta
- Order: Hemiptera
- Suborder: Auchenorrhyncha
- Family: Cicadidae
- Genus: Carineta
- Species: C. diardi

Binomial name
- Carineta diardi (Guerin-Meneville, 1829)

Synonyms
- Carineta formosa

= Carineta diardi =

Species of true bug

Carineta diardi is a species of cicada.

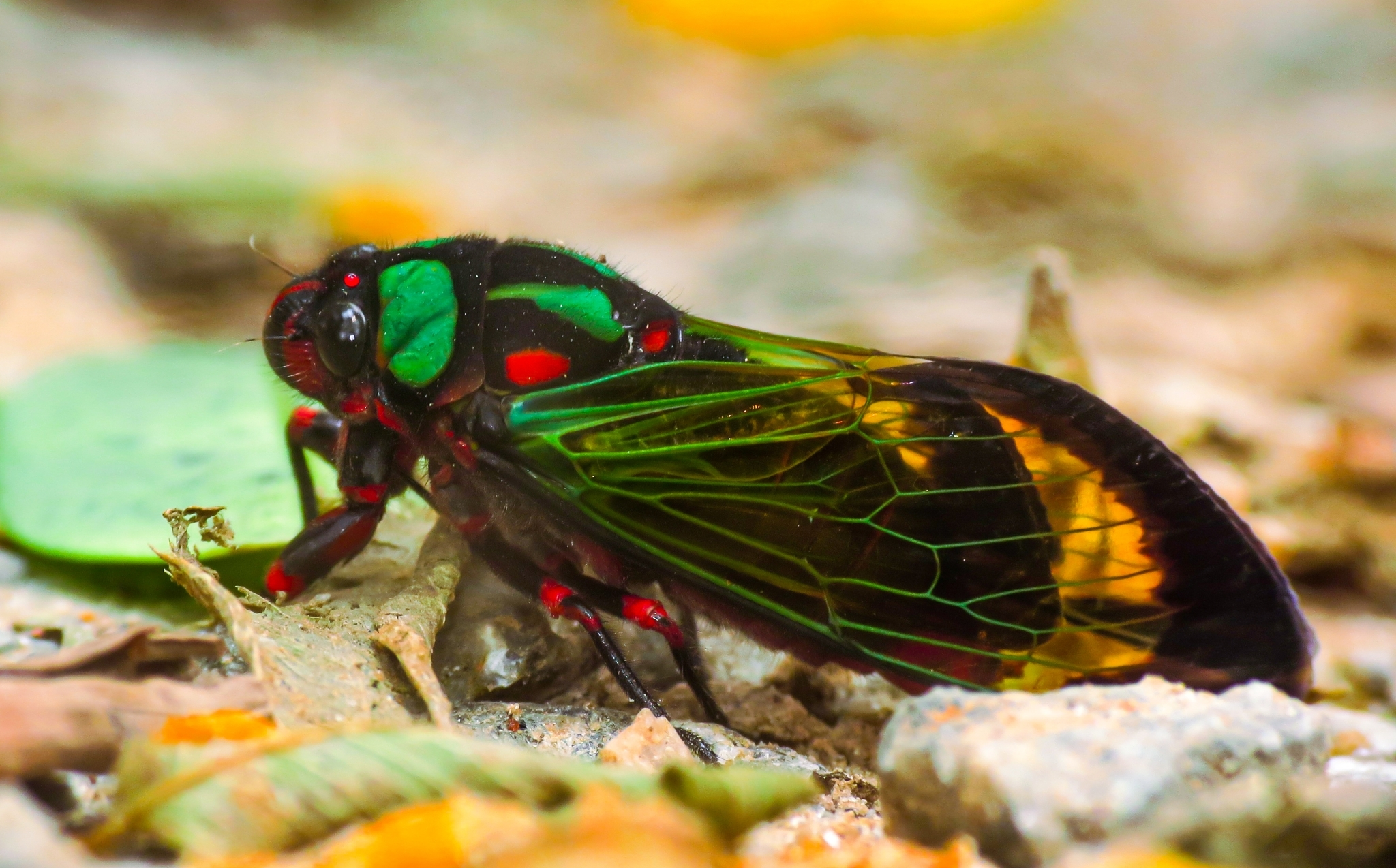
In Brazil

== Distribution ==
This species is present in South America.
