= Changa (cicada) =

Scientific classification
- Kingdom: Animalia
- Phylum: Arthropoda
- Clade: Pancrustacea
- Class: Insecta
- Order: Hemiptera
- Suborder: Auchenorrhyncha
- Family: Cicadidae
- Subtribe: Aolina
- Genus: Changa; Lee, 2016

Genus of true bugs

Changa is a genus of cicadas in the tribe Dundubiini. There are at least two described species in Changa.

== Species ==
These two species belong to the genus Changa:

- Changa jsguillotsi (Boulard, 2005)^{c g}
- Changa sita (Distant, 1881)^{c g}

Data sources: i = ITIS, c = Catalogue of Life, g = GBIF, b = Bugguide.net
