= Aola =

Scientific classification
- Kingdom: Animalia
- Phylum: Arthropoda
- Clade: Pancrustacea
- Class: Insecta
- Order: Hemiptera
- Suborder: Auchenorrhyncha
- Family: Cicadidae
- Subtribe: Aolina
- Genus: Aola; Distant, 1905
- Species: A. bindusara

Binomial name
- Aola bindusara (Distant, 1881)

Synonyms
- Haphsa bindusura [sic] (Distant, 1881); Chremistica ochracea (Boulard, 2005) non Walker, 1850

Genus of true bugs

Aola is a monotypic genus of Asian cicadas in the tribe Dundubiini, typical of the subtribe Aolina; it was erected by William Lucas Distant in 1905. The single species Aola bindusara (Distant, 1881) has been recorded from Pakistan, Bangladesh and Indochina. It was long placed in the genus Haphsa until being restored in 2025.
