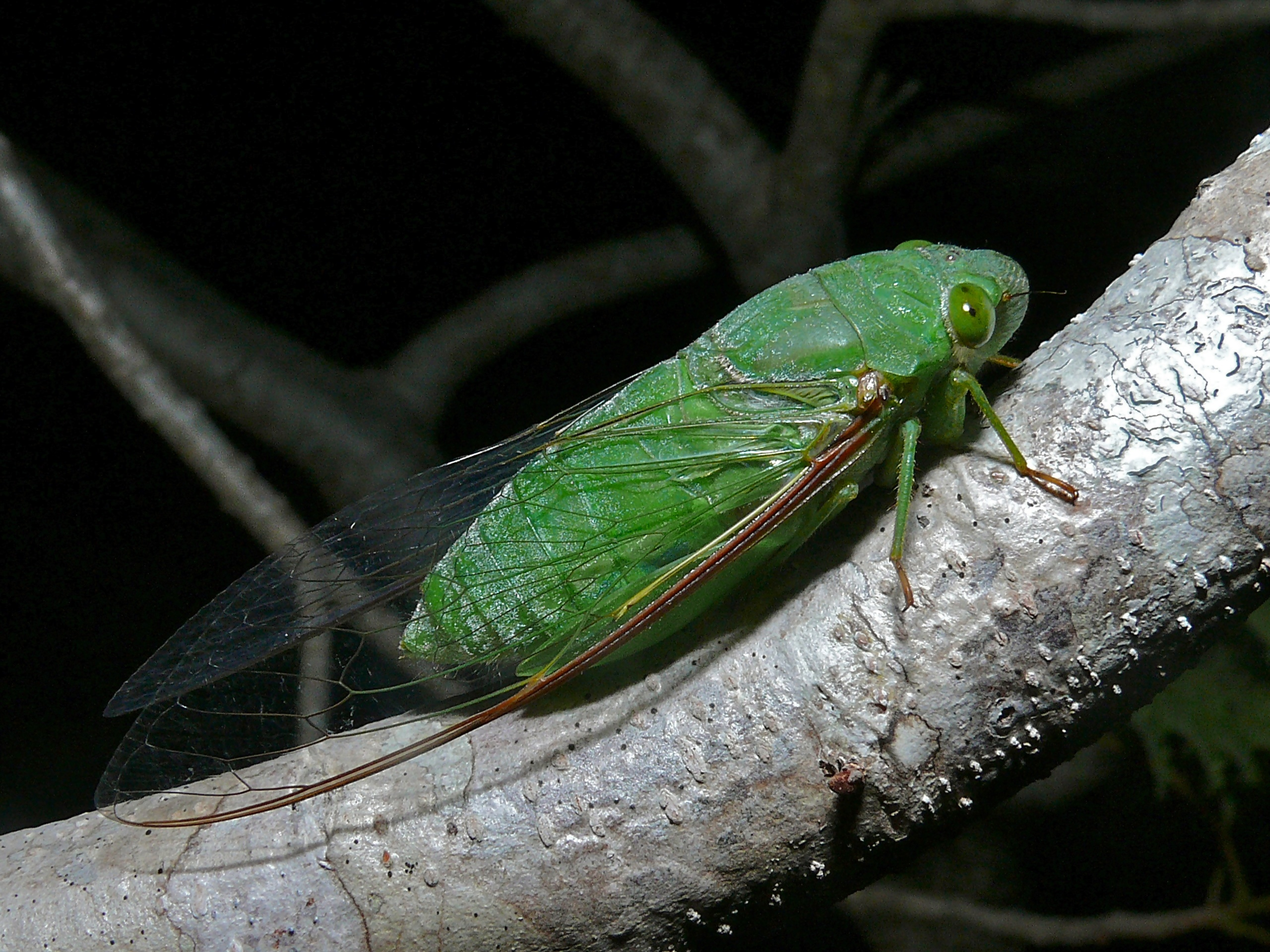
- Dundubia vaginata

Scientific classification
- Kingdom: Animalia
- Phylum: Arthropoda
- Clade: Pancrustacea
- Class: Insecta
- Order: Hemiptera
- Suborder: Auchenorrhyncha
- Family: Cicadidae
- Subfamily: Cicadinae
- Tribe: Dundubiini; Distant, 1905

Subtribes and genera
- See text

= Dundubiini =

Tribe of true bugs

The Dundubiini are a tribe of cicadas in the family Cicadidae, found in the Palearctic, Indomalaya, Australasia, and the Western Pacific. There are at least 180 described species in Dundubiini.

== Subtribes and genera ==
The World Auchenorrhyncha Database includes:

Aolina Boulard, 2013

1. Aola Distant, 1905
2. Biura Lee & Sanborn, 2015
3. Cantata (cicada) Lee & Pham, 2021
4. Changa Lee, 2016
5. Haphsa Distant, 1905
6. Kaphsa Lee, 2012
7. Khimbya Distant, 1905
8. Meimuna Distant, 1905
9. Sinapsaltria Kato, 1940
10. Sinosemia Matsumura, 1927
11. Sinotympana Lee, 2009^{c g}
12. Zaphsa Lee & Emery, 2014^{c g}

Dundubiina Distant, 1905

1. Champaka Distant, 1905^{c g}
2. Crassopsaltria Boulard, 2008^{c g}
3. Dundubia Amyot & Serville, 1843^{c g} - type genus
4. Karenia Distant, 1888
5. Lethama Distant, 1905
6. Macrosemia Kato, 1925^{c g}
7. Minilomia Lee, 2013
8. Platylomia Stål, 1870^{c g}
9. Songga Lee, 2016^{c g}

Megapomponiina Lee, 2014

1. Megapomponia Boulard, 2005^{c g}
2. Unipomponia Lee, 2014^{c g}

Orientopsaltriina Lee, 2014

1. Ayesha Distant, 1905^{c g}
2. Orientopsaltria Kato, 1944^{c g}

incertae sedis

1. Cochleopsaltria Pham & Constant, 2018
2. † Tymocicada Becker-Migdisova, 1954

Data sources: i = ITIS, c = Catalogue of Life, g = GBIF, b = Bugguide.net
