= Karenia (cicada) =

- Karenia caelatata

Scientific classification
- Kingdom: Animalia
- Phylum: Arthropoda
- Clade: Pancrustacea
- Class: Insecta
- Order: Hemiptera
- Suborder: Auchenorrhyncha
- Superfamily: Cicadoidea
- Family: Cicadidae
- Subfamily: Cicadinae
- Tribe: Dundubiini
- Genus: Karenia; Distant, 1888

Genus of true bugs

Karenia is a genus of Asian cicadas in the tribe Dundubiini, erected by William Lucas Distant in 1888. There are about six described species in Karenia, found mostly in China and the Indomalayan realm.

== Species ==
The following species belong to the genus Karenia:

1. Karenia caelatata Distant, 1890
2. Karenia chama Wei & Zhang, 2009
3. Karenia hoanglienensis Pham & Yang, 2012 - Vietnam
4. Karenia ravida Distant, 1888 - type species
5. Karenia sulcata Lei & Chou, 1997
6. Karenia tibetensis Pham & Constant, 2014
