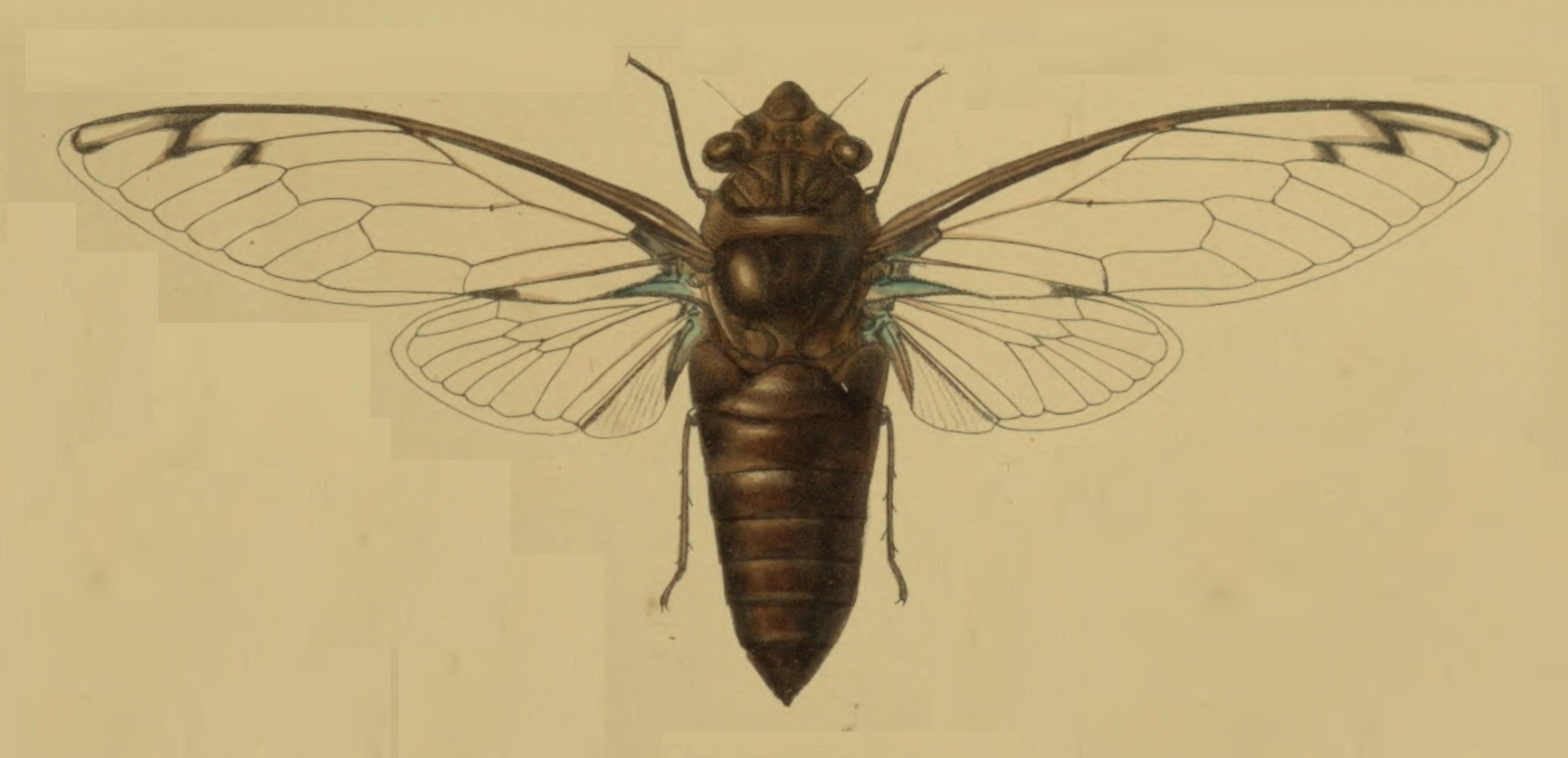
- Champaka viridimaculata

Scientific classification
- Kingdom: Animalia
- Phylum: Arthropoda
- Clade: Pancrustacea
- Class: Insecta
- Order: Hemiptera
- Suborder: Auchenorrhyncha
- Family: Cicadidae
- Tribe: Dundubiini
- Genus: Champaka; Distant, 1905

= Champaka (cicada) =

Genus of cicadas

Champaka is a genus of cicadas in the family Cicadidae. There are about 12 described species in Champaka.

== Species ==
The following species belong to the genus Champaka:

1. Champaka abdulla (Distant, 1881)^{c g}
2. Champaka aerata (Distant, 1888)^{c g}
3. Champaka celebensis Distant, 1913^{c g}
4. Champaka constanti (Lee, 2009)^{c g}
5. Champaka maxima (Lee, 2009)^{c g}
6. Champaka meyeri (Distant, 1883)^{c g}
7. Champaka nigra (Distant, 1888)^{c g}
8. Champaka solivenae Lee, 2015^{c g}
9. Champaka spinosa (Fabricius, 1787)^{c g}
10. Champaka virescens (Distant, 1905)^{c g}
11. Champaka viridimaculata (Distant, 1889)^{c g}
  - type species (as Pomponia viridimaculata Distant, 1889)
12. Champaka wallacei (Beuk, 1999)^{c g}

Data sources: i = ITIS, c = Catalogue of Life, g = GBIF, b = Bugguide.net
