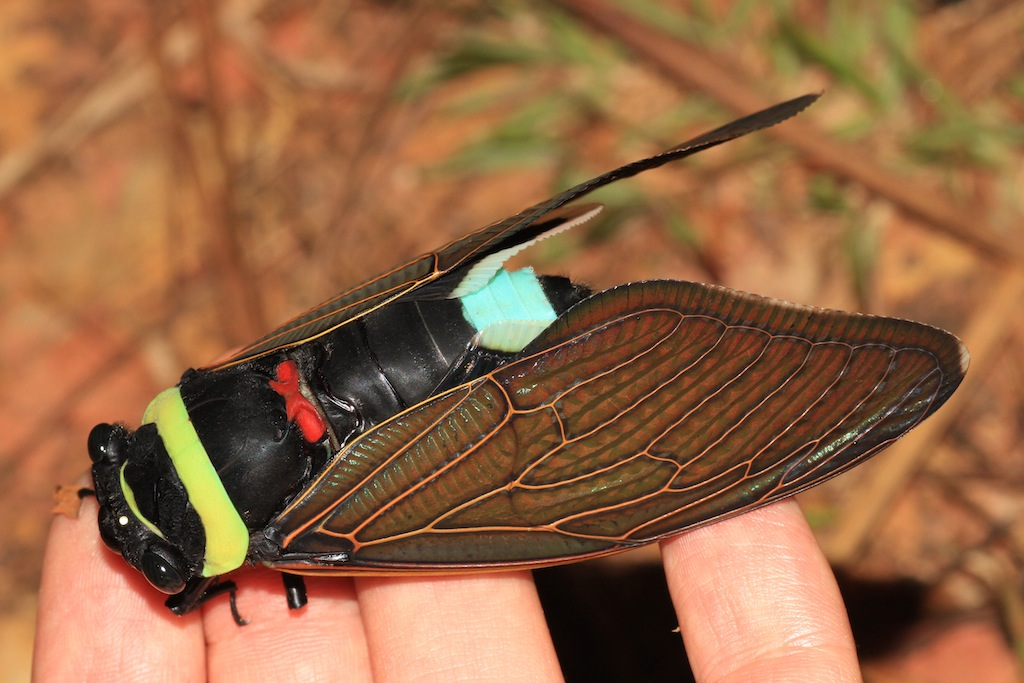

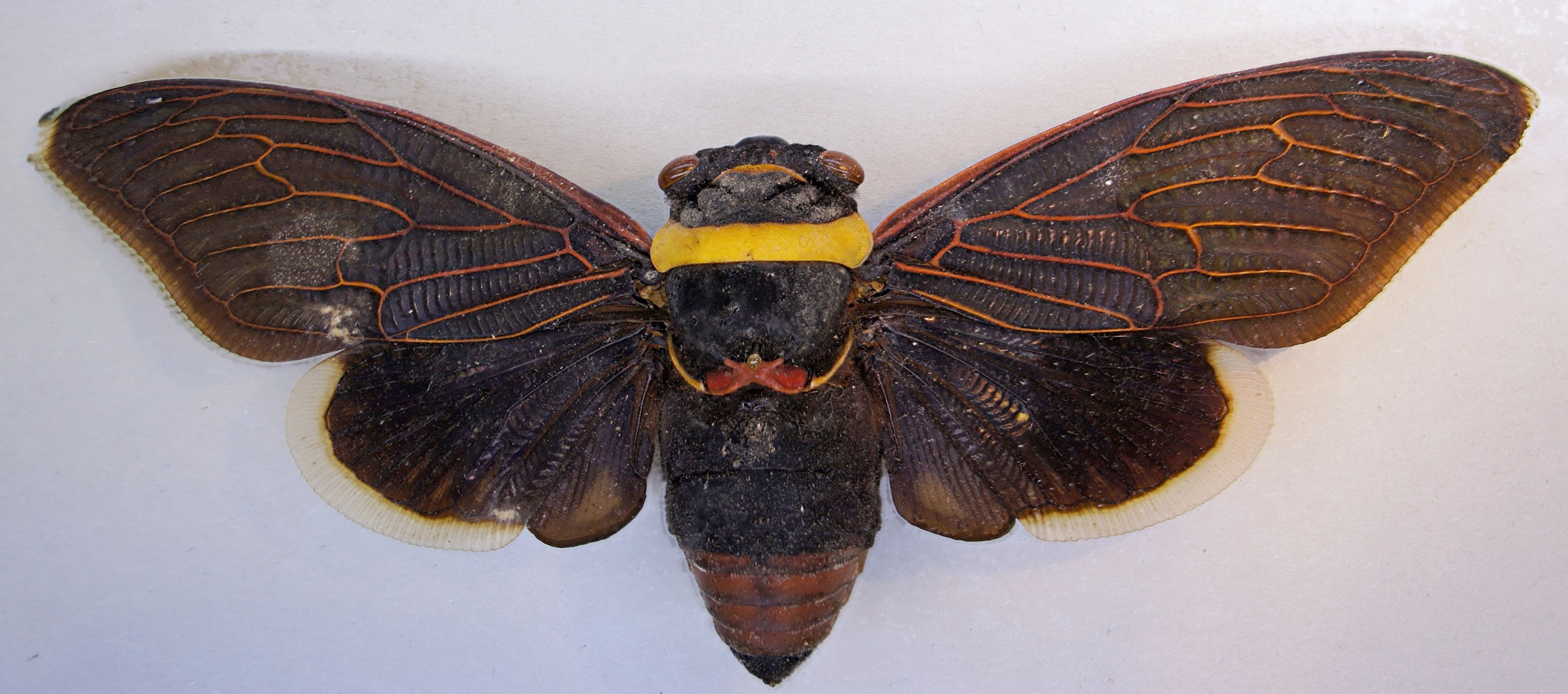

Scientific classification
- Kingdom: Animalia
- Phylum: Arthropoda
- Clade: Pancrustacea
- Class: Insecta
- Order: Hemiptera
- Suborder: Auchenorrhyncha
- Family: Cicadidae
- Subfamily: Cicadinae
- Tribe: Tacuini
- Subtribe: Tacuina
- Genus: Tacua; Amyot & Audinet-Serville, 1843
- Species: T. speciosa

Binomial name
- Tacua speciosa (Illiger, 1800)

Synonyms
- Tettigonia speciosa Illiger, 1800; Cicada indica Donovan, 1800; Cicada speciosa (Illiger, 1800)

= Tacua speciosa =

Species of cicada

Tacua speciosa is a very large Southeast Asian species of cicada. It is the only member of the genus Tacua (from Chinese: 大鼓; pinyin: dàgǔ; Wade–Giles: ta^{4}ku^{3}; lit. 'big drum') and is the type genus of the tribe Tacuini.

== Description ==
Tacua speciosa has a wingspan of 15–18 cm (5.9–7.1 in) and a head-body length of 4.7–5.7 cm (1.9–2.2 in). Megapomponia, Pomponia and Tacua are the largest cicadas in the world. Tacua speciosa has black wings, a yellow-green collar, a red transverse stripe on the thorax and a turquoise-blue abdomen.

== Distribution ==
This species can be found in Borneo, Sumatra, Java, Singapore, Malay Peninsula. It was once described as from North East India but it seems to be a mistake.
