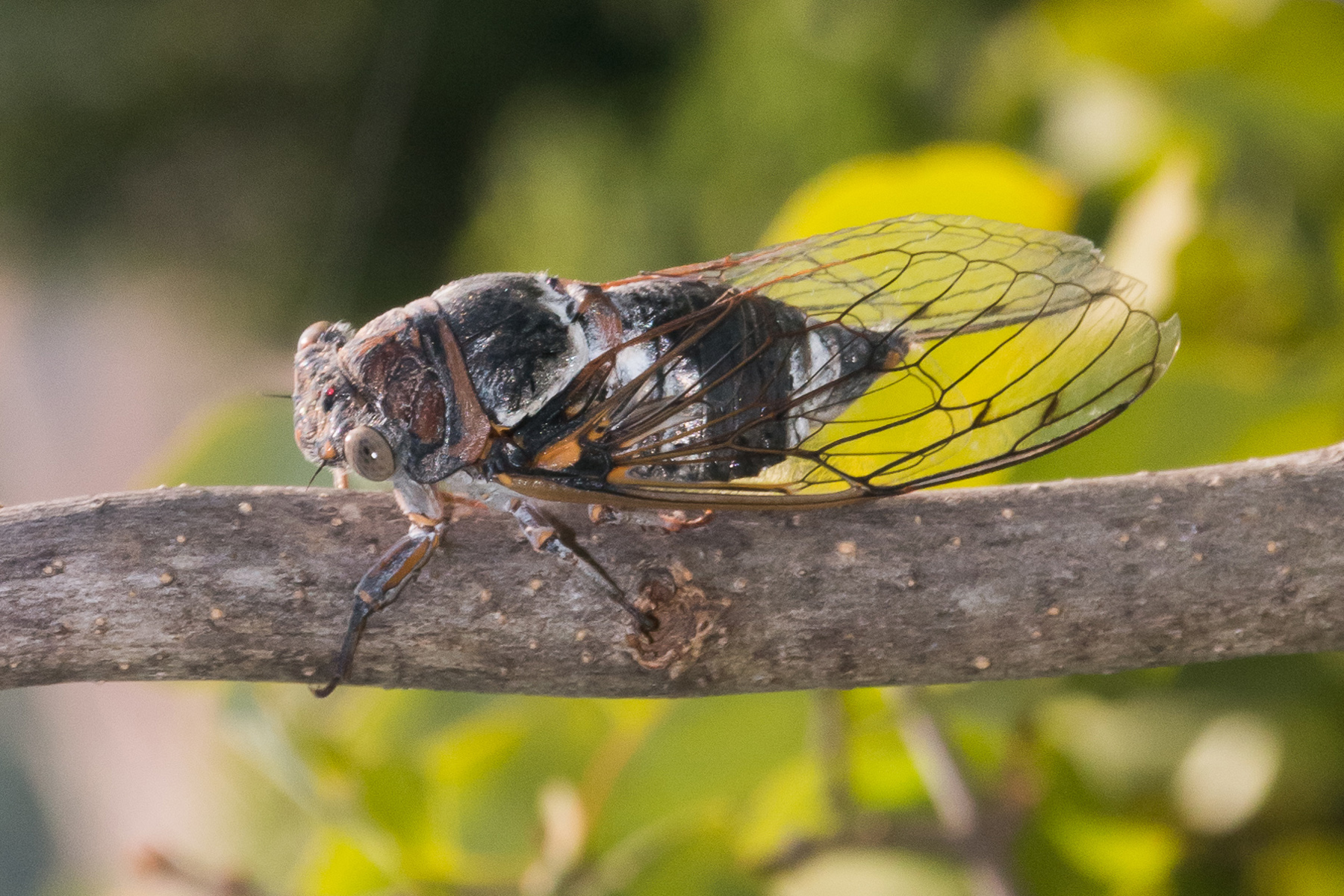
- Cicada barbara

Scientific classification
- Kingdom: Animalia
- Phylum: Arthropoda
- Clade: Pancrustacea
- Class: Insecta
- Order: Hemiptera
- Suborder: Auchenorrhyncha
- Infraorder: Cicadomorpha
- Superfamily: Cicadoidea
- Family: Cicadidae
- Subfamily: Cicadinae
- Tribe: Cicadini; Batsch, 1789

= Cicadini =

Tribe of true bugs

The Cicadini are a tribe of cicadas, erected by August Batsch in 1789. Species have been recorded from central and South America, as well as the Palaearctic and Indomalayan realms.

== Genera ==
the World Auchenorrhyncha Database includes:

subtribe Cicadina Batsch, 1789

1. Cicada Linnaeus, 1758

subtribe Psithyristriina Distant, 1905

1. Basa (cicada) Distant, 1905 - central Asia
2. Kamalata Distant, 1889 - Thailand, Malesia
3. Onomacritus (cicada) Distant, 1912 - Sumatra
4. Psithyristria Stål, 1870 - Philippines
5. Semia Matsumura, 1916 - China, Indochina

incertae sedis

1. Hyalessa China, 1925 - Indian subcontinent, China through to Japan

moved to monogeneric tribe Pomponiini Kato, 1932

1. Pomponia Stål, 1866
