= Psithyristriina =

Scientific classification
- Kingdom: Animalia
- Phylum: Arthropoda
- Clade: Pancrustacea
- Class: Insecta
- Order: Hemiptera
- Suborder: Auchenorrhyncha
- Family: Cicadidae
- Subfamily: Cicadinae
- Tribe: Cicadini
- Subtribe: Psithyristriina; Distant, 1905

Tribe of true bugs

Psithyristriina is a subtribe of cicadas in the subfamily Cicadinae and tribe Cicadini, originally erected as tribe "Psithyristriini" by William Lucas Distant in 1905. There were at least 100 described species in Psithyristriini, found in South, East and Southeast Asia.

== Genera ==
the World Auchenorrhyncha Database includes:

1. Basa Distant, 1905 - central Asia
2. Kamalata Distant, 1889 - Thailand, Malesia
3. Onomacritus Distant, 1912 - Sumatra
4. Psithyristria Stål, 1870 - Philippines
5. Semia Matsumura, 1916 - China, Indochina
