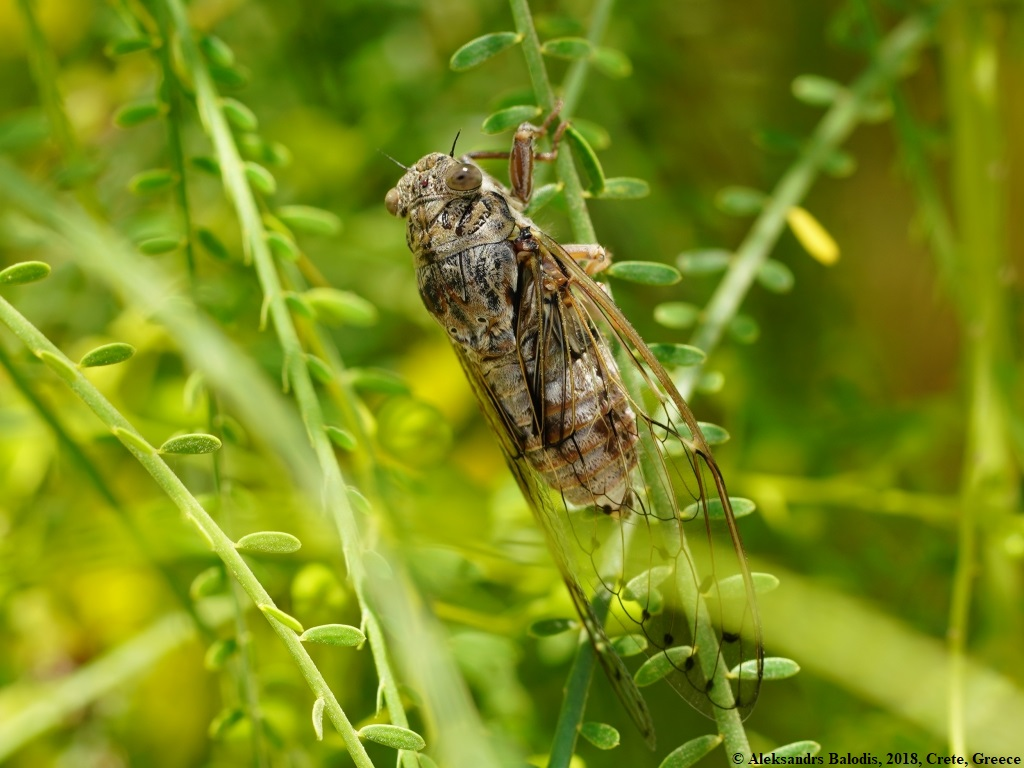

Scientific classification
- Kingdom: Animalia
- Phylum: Arthropoda
- Class: Insecta
- Order: Hemiptera
- Suborder: Auchenorrhyncha
- Family: Cicadidae
- Genus: Cicada
- Species: C. cretensis

Binomial name
- Cicada cretensis Quartau and Simões, 2005

= Cicada cretensis =

Species of cicada

Cicada cretensis, colloquially called the Cretan cicada, is a species of cicada belonging to the family Cicadidae, subfamily Cicadinae, and the genus Cicada. C. cretensis closely resembles C. orni and C. mordoganensis appearance, making it difficult to differentiate based solely on external features.

== Etymology ==
The genus name is derived directly from the Latin word cicada, meaning 'buzzer,'while the species epithet cretensis refers to Crete, the island to which this cicada is endemic.

== Appearance ==
In terms of size, measured from the crown to the wingtips males and females are relatively the same size (40-47mm).

C. cretensis is somewhat larger than C. orni (males: 35–43 mm; females: 36–44 mm) and comparable in size to C. mordoganensis (males: 40–47 mm; females: 39–46 mm).

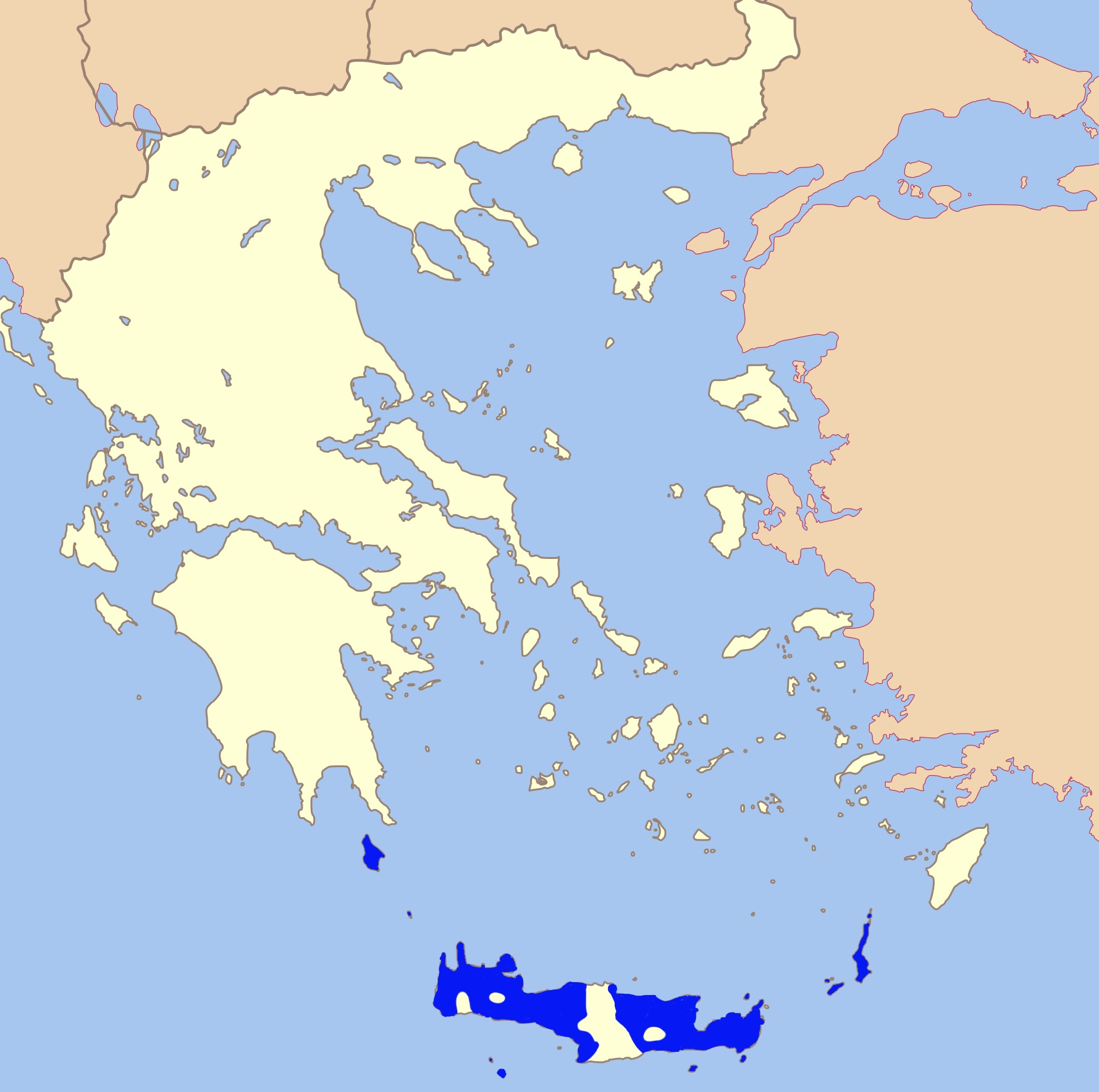
Habitat map
