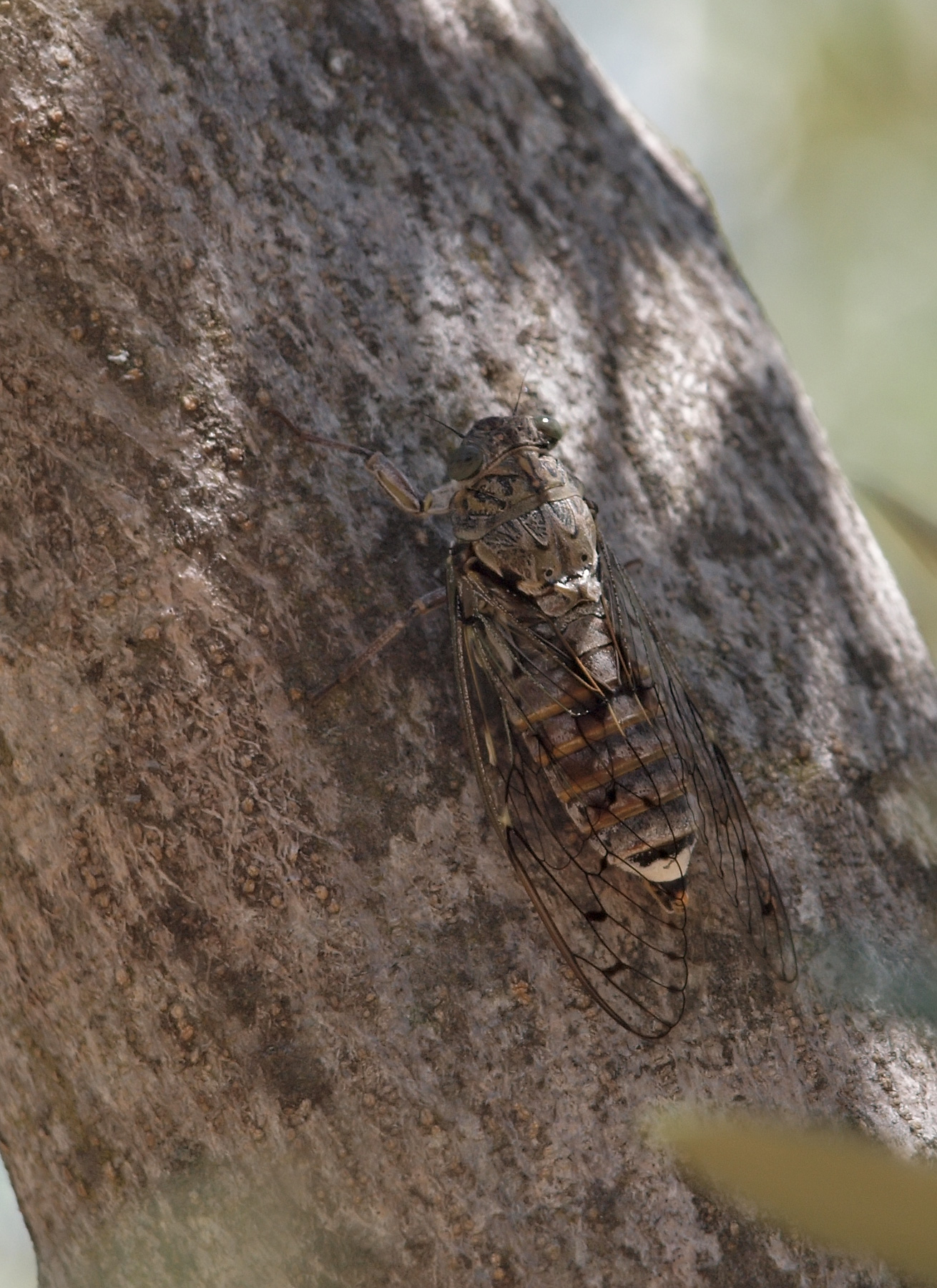
- Cicada barbara subsp. lusitanica

Scientific classification
- Kingdom: Animalia
- Phylum: Arthropoda
- Clade: Pancrustacea
- Class: Insecta
- Order: Hemiptera
- Suborder: Auchenorrhyncha
- Family: Cicadidae
- Genus: Cicada
- Species: C. barbara
- Subspecies: C. b. lusitanica

Trinomial name
- Cicada barbara lusitanica Boulard, 1982

= Cicada barbara lusitanica =

Subspecies of true bug

Cicada barbara lusitanica is a subspecies of Cicada barbara belonging to the family Cicadidae, subfamily Cicadinae, and the genus Cicada.

== Distribution ==
Present in Portugal.
