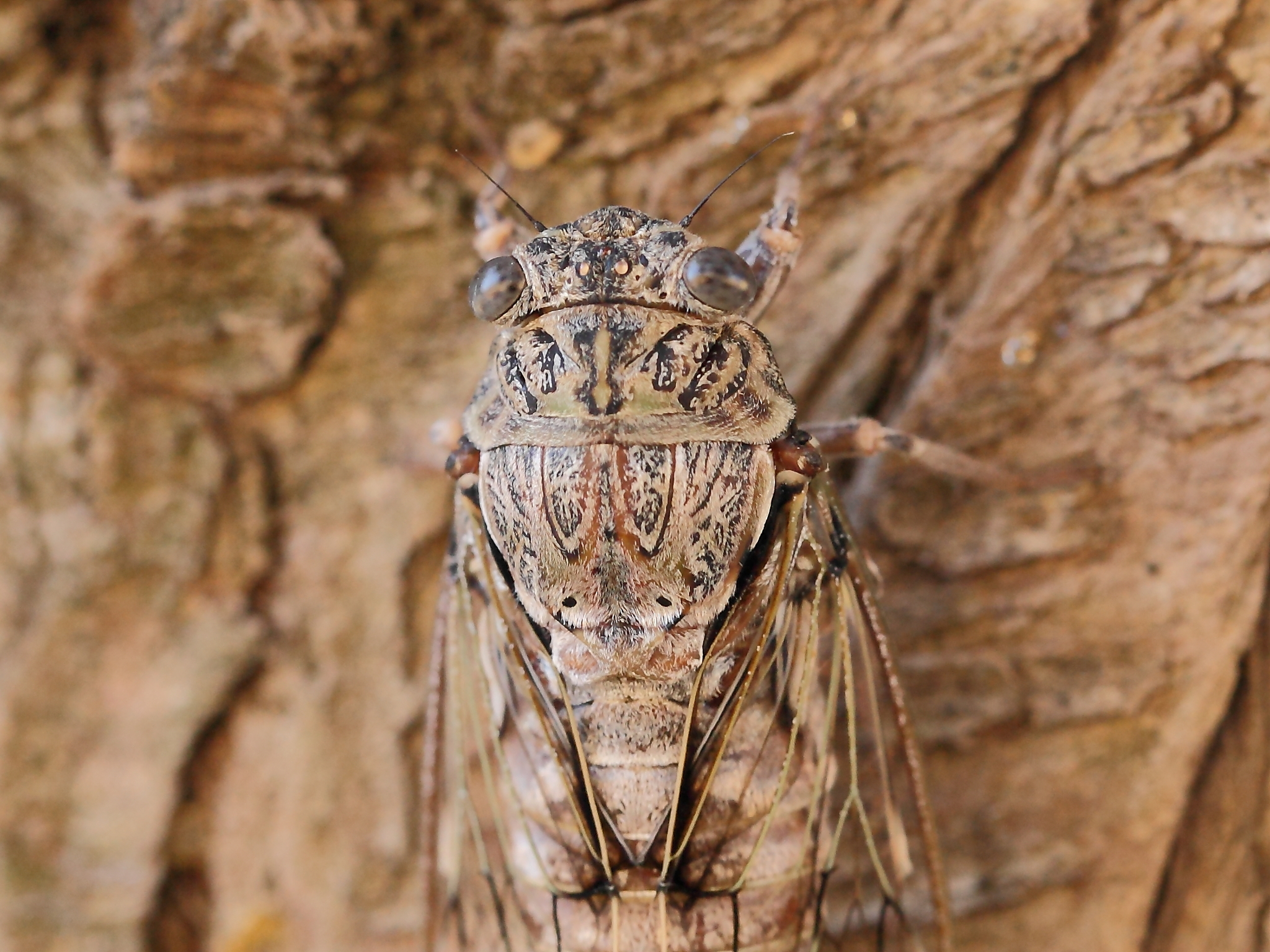

Scientific classification
- Kingdom: Animalia
- Phylum: Arthropoda
- Clade: Pancrustacea
- Class: Insecta
- Order: Hemiptera
- Suborder: Auchenorrhyncha
- Family: Cicadidae
- Genus: Cicada
- Species: C. mordoganensis

Binomial name
- Cicada mordoganensis Boulard, 1979

= Cicada mordoganensis =

Species of insect

Cicada mordoganensis, the East Aegean cicada, is a species of cicada belonging to the family Cicadidae, subfamily Cicadinae, and the genus Cicada.

== Etymology ==
The genus name is derived from the Latin word cicada, meaning "buzzer", while the species epithet mordoganensis refers to Mordoğan, a coastal town in Türkiye's İzmir Province, where this cicada was first documented.

== Appearance ==
Male specimens typically measure between 40 and 47 mm in body length, with females being 39 to 46 mm.

== Habitat and behaviour ==
Males are commonly found singing on olive trees and pines, often forming loud choruses.

== Distribution ==
This species is primarily found along the western coast of Turkey. It also inhabits several nearby Greek islands, including Rhodes, Samos, Icaria, Kos, Patmos etc., as well as the northeastern coast of Crete.

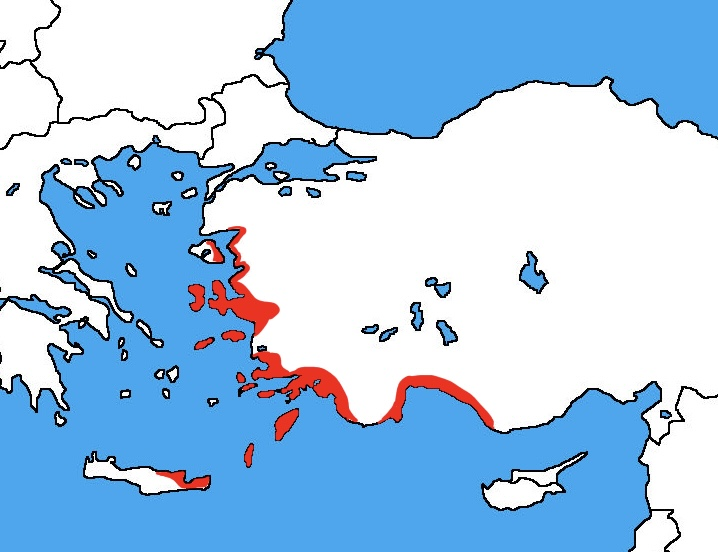
Habitat map

== Acoustic behaviour ==
The calling song of Cicada mordoganensis is distinct from that of Cicada orni and Cicada cretensis.

== Evolution ==
The species likely diverged from Cicada orni due to geographic isolation.
