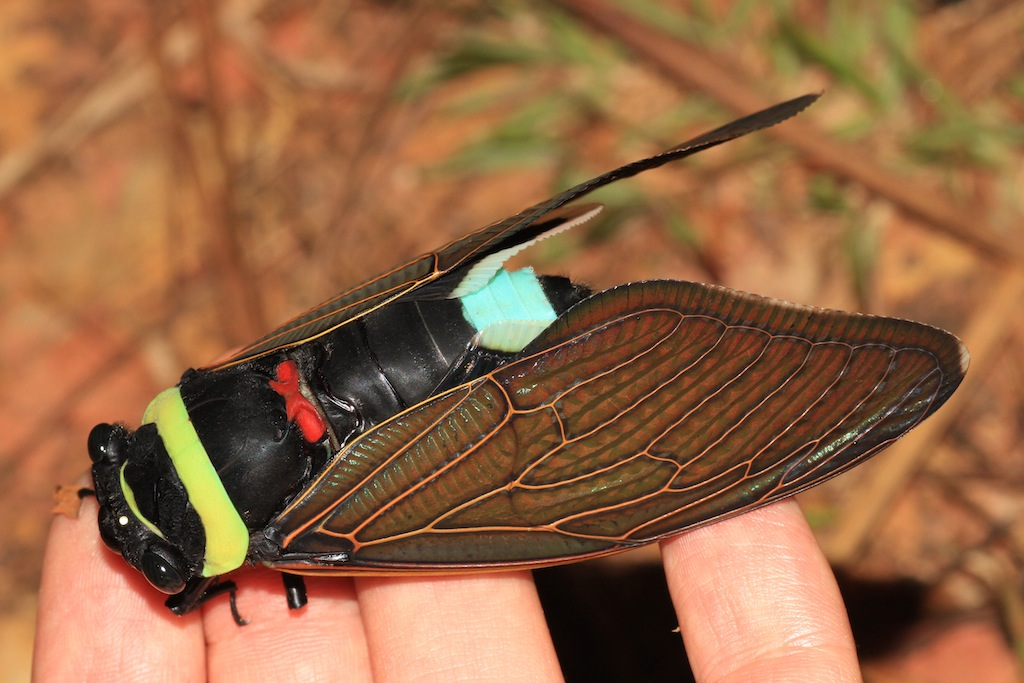
- Tacua speciosa

Scientific classification
- Domain: Eukaryota
- Kingdom: Animalia
- Phylum: Arthropoda
- Class: Insecta
- Order: Hemiptera
- Suborder: Auchenorrhyncha
- Family: Cicadidae
- Subfamily: Cicadinae
- Tribe: Tacuini; Distant, 1904

= Tacuini =

Tribe of cicadas

The Tacuini are a tribe of cicadas, originally erected by William Lucas Distant in 1904. Most genera were placed previously in the tribe Cryptotympanini, with proposed synonomisation by Marshall et al. (2018); it was later confirmed that Tacuini was valid, having date priority.

== Subtribes and selected genera ==
The World Auchenorrhyncha Database includes two monogeneric subtribes and the Tacuina:

Heteropsaltriina Distant, 1905

- Heteropsaltria Jacobi, 1902 – Melanesia

Nggelianina Boulard, 1979

- Nggeliana Boulard, 1979 – Melanesia

Tacuina Distant, 1904

Worldwide (temperate and tropical) – synonym of Cryptotympanini Handlirsch, 1925; selected genera:

- Cacama Distant, 1904
- Chremistica Stål, 1870
- Cryptotympana Stål, 1861
- Lyristes Horváth, 1926 (synonym of Tibicen)
- Megatibicen Sanborn & Heath, 2016
- Neotibicen Hill & Moulds, 2015
- Psaltoda Stal, 1861
- Tacua Amyot & Audinet-Serville, 1843 - type genus
