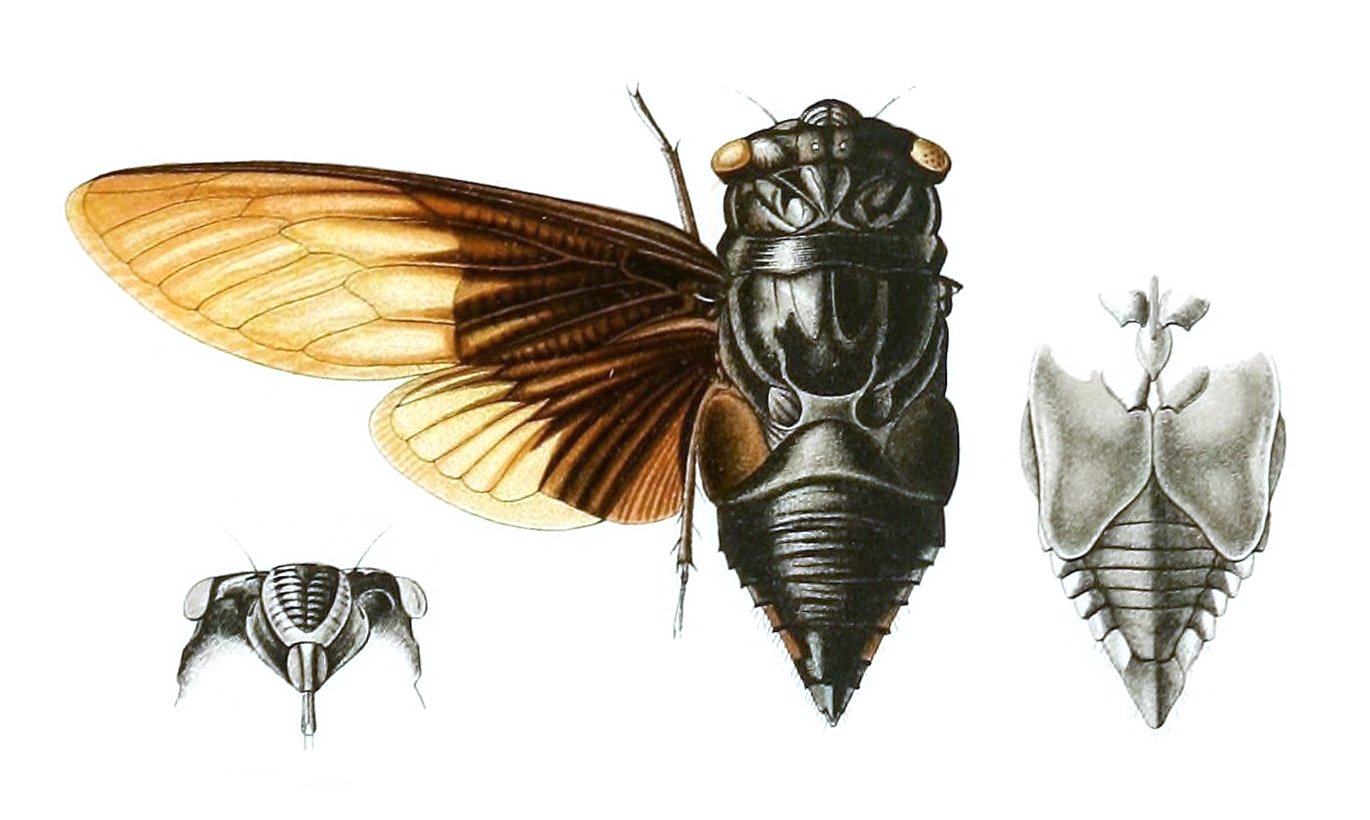
- Cryptotympana holsti, male
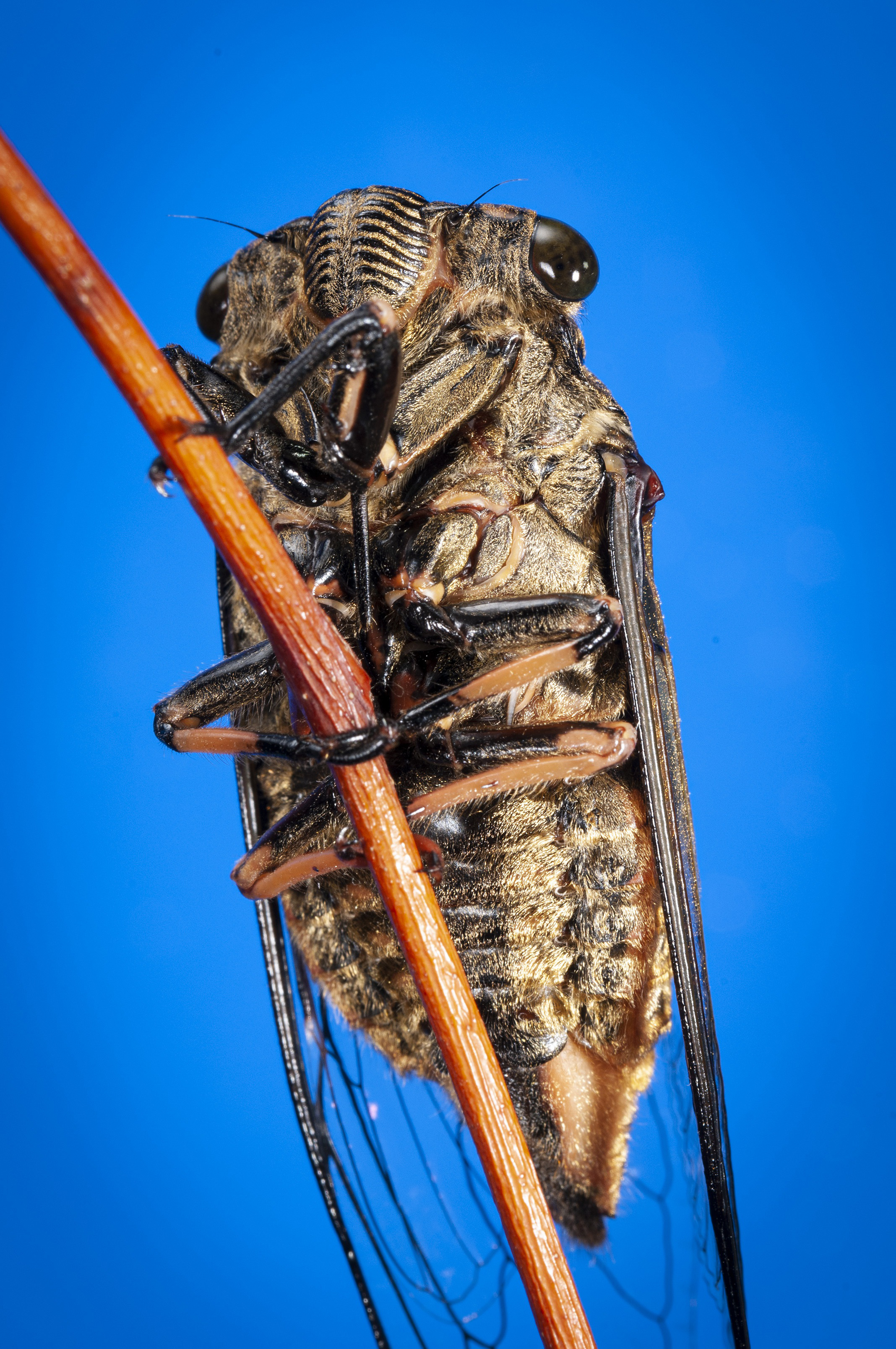
- Cryptotympana atrata, Adult, Korea

Scientific classification
- Kingdom: Animalia
- Phylum: Arthropoda
- Clade: Pancrustacea
- Class: Insecta
- Order: Hemiptera
- Suborder: Auchenorrhyncha
- Family: Cicadidae
- Subfamily: Cicadinae
- Tribe: Tacuini
- Subtribe: Tacuina
- Genus: Cryptotympana; Stål, 1861

Synonyms
- Chryptotympana Stål, 1861 and several other orthographic variants; Cyrister Liu, 1991

= Cryptotympana =

Genus of true bugs

Cryptotympana is a genus of cicadas from Southeast Asia, now placed in the tribe Tacuini.

== Gallery ==
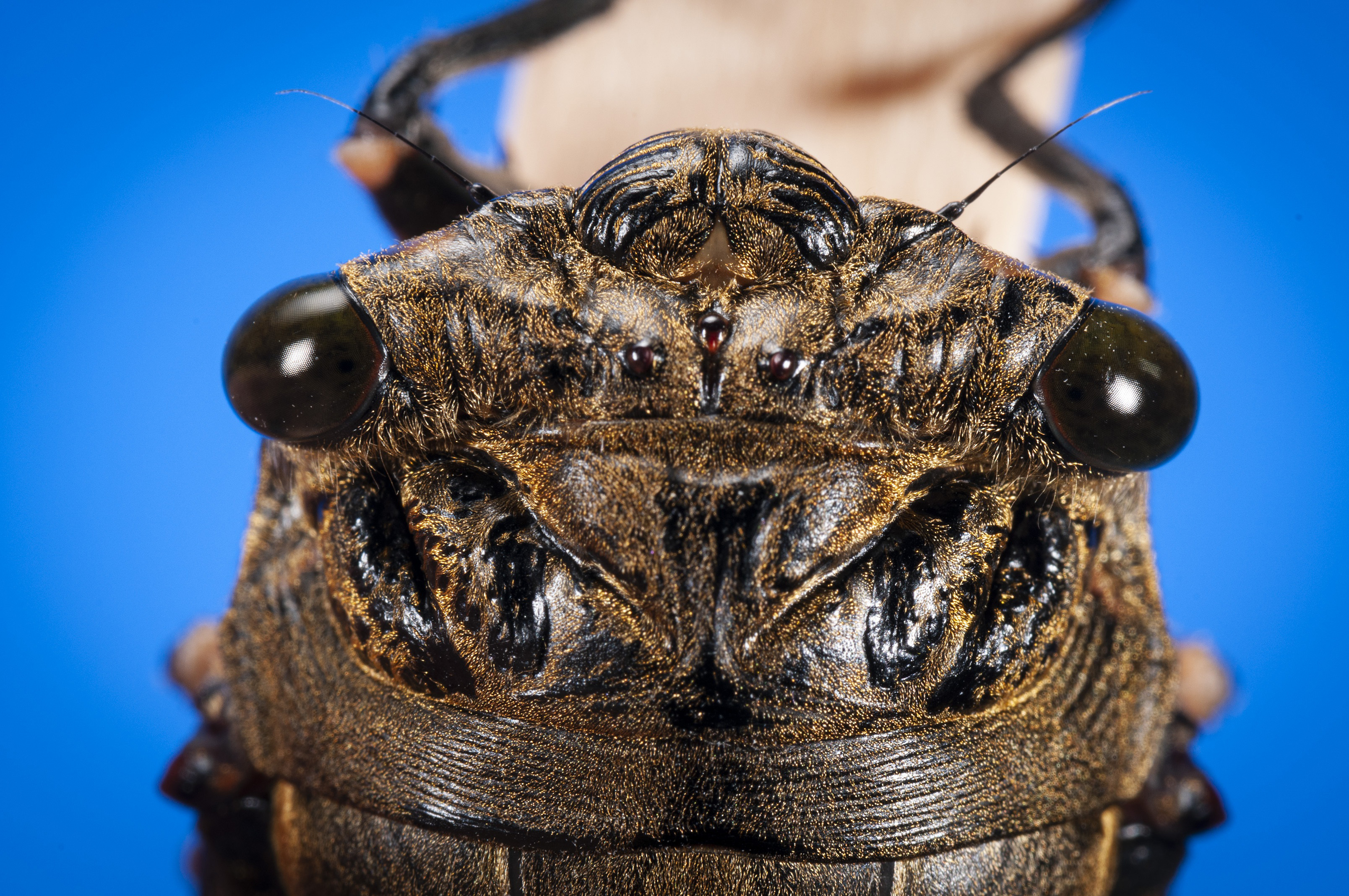
Cryptotympana atrata , Adult

== Species ==
The World Auchenorrhyncha Database lists:

1. Cryptotympana accipiter (Walker, 1850)
2. Cryptotympana acuta (Signoret, 1849)
3. Cryptotympana albolineata Hayashi, 1987
4. Cryptotympana alorensis Hayashi, 1987
5. Cryptotympana aquila (Walker, 1850)
6. Cryptotympana atrata (Fabricius, 1775)
  - type species (as Tettigonia pustulata Fabricius, 1787)
7. Cryptotympana auripilosa Hayashi, 1987
8. Cryptotympana brevicorpus Hayashi, 1987
9. Cryptotympana brunnea Hayashi, 1987
10. Cryptotympana consanguinea Distant, 1916
11. Cryptotympana corvus (Walker, 1850)
12. Cryptotympana demissitia Distant, 1891
13. Cryptotympana diomedea (Walker, 1858)
14. Cryptotympana distanti Hayashi, 1987
15. Cryptotympana dohertyi Hayashi, 1987
16. Cryptotympana edwardsi Kirkaldy, 1902
17. Cryptotympana epithesia Distant, 1888
18. Cryptotympana exalbida Distant, 1891
19. Cryptotympana facialis (Walker, 1858) (2 subspecies)
20. Cryptotympana fumipennis (Walker, 1858)
21. Cryptotympana gracilis Hayashi, 1987
22. Cryptotympana holsti Distant, 1904
  (2 subspecies; syn. C. vitalisi Distant, 1917 - India, China, Indochina)
23. Cryptotympana immaculata Olivier, 1790
24. †Cryptotympana incasa Zhang, Sun & Zhang, 1994
25. Cryptotympana insularis Distant, 1887
26. Cryptotympana intermedia (Signoret, 1849)
27. Cryptotympana izzardi Lallemand & Synave, 1953
28. Cryptotympana jacobsoni China, 1926
29. Cryptotympana karnyi Moulton, 1923
30. Cryptotympana kotoshoensis Kato, 1925
31. Cryptotympana limborgi Distant, 1888
32. Cryptotympana lombokensis Distant, 1912
33. Cryptotympana mandarina Distant, 1891
34. Cryptotympana miocenica Zhang & Zhang, 1990
35. Cryptotympana moultoni Hayashi, 1987
36. Cryptotympana niasana Distant, 1909
37. Cryptotympana nitidula Hayashi, 1987
38. Cryptotympana ochromelas Hayashi, 1987
39. Cryptotympana pelengensis Hayashi, 1987
40. Cryptotympana praeclara Hayashi, 1987
41. Cryptotympana recta (Walker, 1850)
42. Cryptotympana robinsoni Moulton, 1923
43. Cryptotympana shillana Lee & Mohagan, 2016
44. Cryptotympana sibuyana Hayashi, 1987
45. Cryptotympana socialis Hayashi, 1987
46. Cryptotympana suluensis Distant, 1906
47. Cryptotympana takasagona Kato, 1925
48. Cryptotympana timorica (Walker, 1870)
49. Cryptotympana varicolor Distant, 1904
50. Cryptotympana ventralis Hayashi, 1987
51. Cryptotympana vesta (Distant, 1904)
52. Cryptotympana viridicostalis Hayashi, 1987
53. Cryptotympana wetarensis Hayashi, 1987
54. Cryptotympana yaeyamana Kato, 1925
