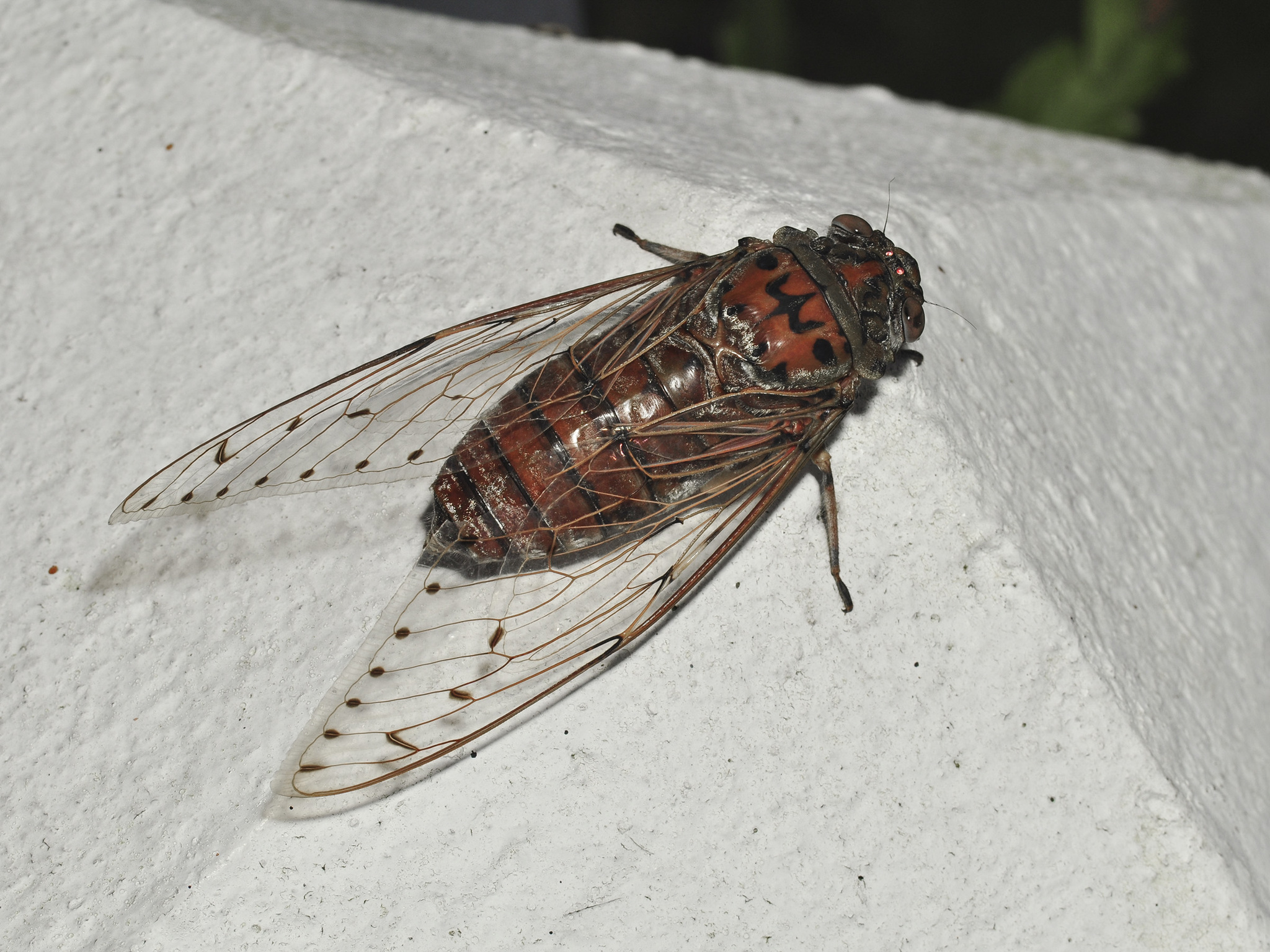
- Pictured in Fraser's Hill, Malaysia, in 2010.

Scientific classification
- Kingdom: Animalia
- Phylum: Arthropoda
- Clade: Pancrustacea
- Class: Insecta
- Order: Hemiptera
- Suborder: Auchenorrhyncha
- Family: Cicadidae
- Genus: Megapomponia
- Species: M. imperatoria

Binomial name
- Megapomponia imperatoria (Westwood, 1842)

Synonyms
- Pomponia imperatoria

= Empress cicada =

Species of true bug

The empress cicada (Megapomponia imperatoria) is a species of cicada from Southeast Asia. It is the largest species of cicada with a head-body length of about 7 cm (2.8 in) and a wingspan of 18–20 cm (7–8 in).
