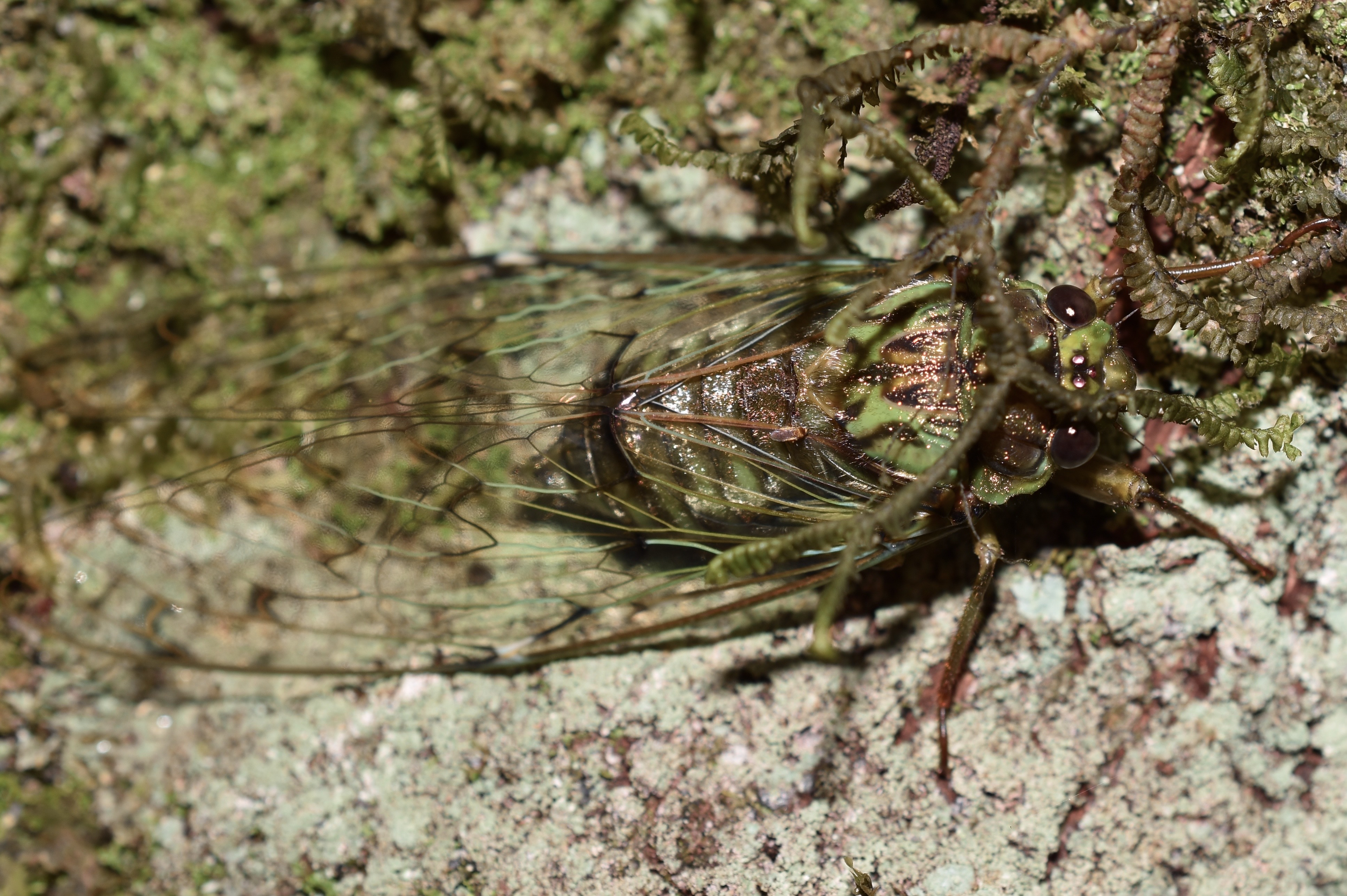
- Pomponia polei in Galway's Land National Park, Nuwara Eliya

Scientific classification
- Kingdom: Animalia
- Phylum: Arthropoda
- Class: Insecta
- Order: Hemiptera
- Suborder: Auchenorrhyncha
- Family: Cicadidae
- Genus: Pomponia
- Species: P. polei

Binomial name
- Pomponia polei Henry, 1931

Synonyms
- Terpnosia polei (Henry, 1931)

= Pomponia polei =

Species of cicada

Pomponia polei is a species of cicada in the family Cicadidae, endemic to the central highlands of Sri Lanka.

== Taxonomy and systematics ==
The species was first described by George Morrison Reid Henry in 1931 as Pomponia polei. Then transferred to Terpnosia genus and later transferred back to Pomponia. The holotype male is deposited at the Natural History Museum in London.

== Description ==
The species exhibits the diagnostic characters defined by Lee (2012) for the genus Pomponia. These include a pronotum with a toothed (dentate) lateral margin and a forewing in which the basal section of vein RA₂ is extremely short. The forewing displays broad, transparent infuscations on the crossveins r, r-m, and m, and an elliptical infuscation is present along the hind margin of veins RA₂, RP, M₁–₄, and CuA₁. In the male, the operculum is broader than long with a rounded apex, extending to or just beyond the posterior margin of the second sternite. The male abdomen is cylindrical and notably longer than the combined length of the head and thorax, and the timbal cover is well developed.

== Distribution ==
The species is endemic to Sri Lanka, where it is found in the central highlands.
