= Onomacritus (cicada) =

Scientific classification
- Kingdom: Animalia
- Phylum: Arthropoda
- Clade: Pancrustacea
- Class: Insecta
- Order: Hemiptera
- Suborder: Auchenorrhyncha
- Family: Cicadidae
- Tribe: Cicadini
- Genus: Onomacritus; Distant, 1912

Genus of true bugs

Onomacritus is a monotypic genus of cicadas in the tribe Cicadini. The species is Onomacritus sumatranus.
