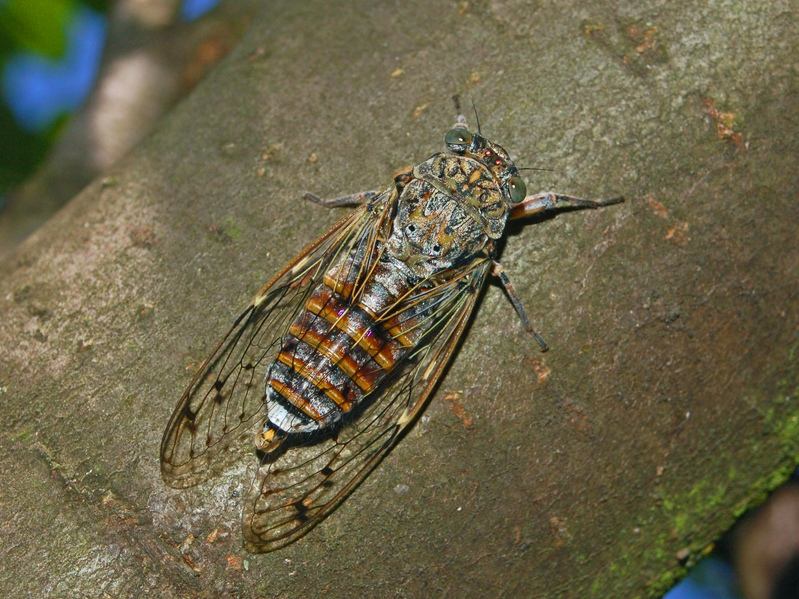
- Cicada orni, dorsal view

Scientific classification
- Kingdom: Animalia
- Phylum: Arthropoda
- Class: Insecta
- Order: Hemiptera
- Suborder: Auchenorrhyncha
- Family: Cicadidae
- Subfamily: Cicadinae
- Tribe: Cicadini
- Subtribe: Cicadina
- Genus: Cicada; Linnaeus, 1758

= Cicada (genus) =

Genus of cicadas

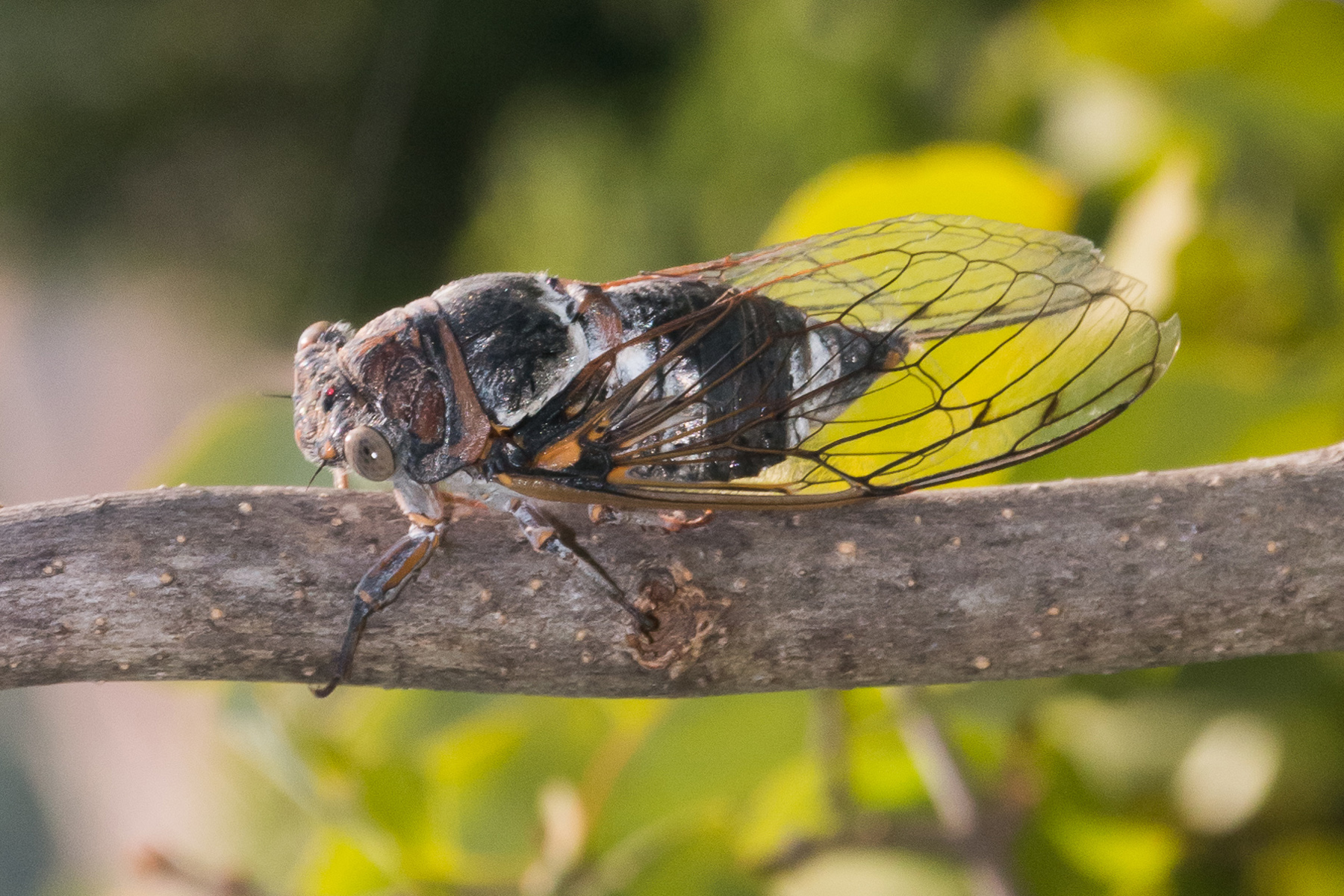
Cicada barbara

Cicada is the type genus of cicadas in the family Cicadidae and the tribe Cicadini. Historically, a large number of species have been described as "Cicada", but are now placed elsewhere; valid species are mostly found in the Palaearctic realm and Indian subcontinent.

== Species ==
The family Cicadidae has undergone many revisions and it includes many insects that outwardly appear to be similar; many species were previously assigned to Cicada, but are now placed in different genera (frequently in other tribes). Revisions have continued into the 21st century and even in 2018 there remained over 60 named species here. The World Auchenorrhyncha Database currently (July 2025) includes:

1. Cicada albicans Walker, 1858
2. Cicada albida Gmelin, 1789
3. Cicada asius Walker, 1850
4. Cicada barbara (Stål, 1866) (2 subspecies)
5. Cicada casmatmema Capanni, 1894
6. Cicada cerisyi Guérin-Méneville, 1844
7. Cicada complex Walker, 1850
8. Cicada cretensis Quartau & Simões, 2005
9. Cicada fuscomaculata Goeze, 1778
10. Cicada goezei Metcalf, 1963
11. Cicada lodosi Boulard, 1979
12. Cicada mannifica Forskål, 1775
13. Cicada mordoganensis Boulard, 1979
14. Cicada nigropunctata Goeze, 1778
15. Cicada opercularis Olivier, 1791
16. Cicada orni Linnaeus, 1758 - type species
17. Cicada permagna (Haupt, 1917)
18. Cicada regina Graber, 1876
19. Cicada sebai Metcalf, 1963
20. Cicada turtoni Metcalf, 1963

fossil species

1. †Cicada heeri Dmitriev, 2020
2. †Cicada tithonus Moulds, Kaulfuss & Gehler, 2023
