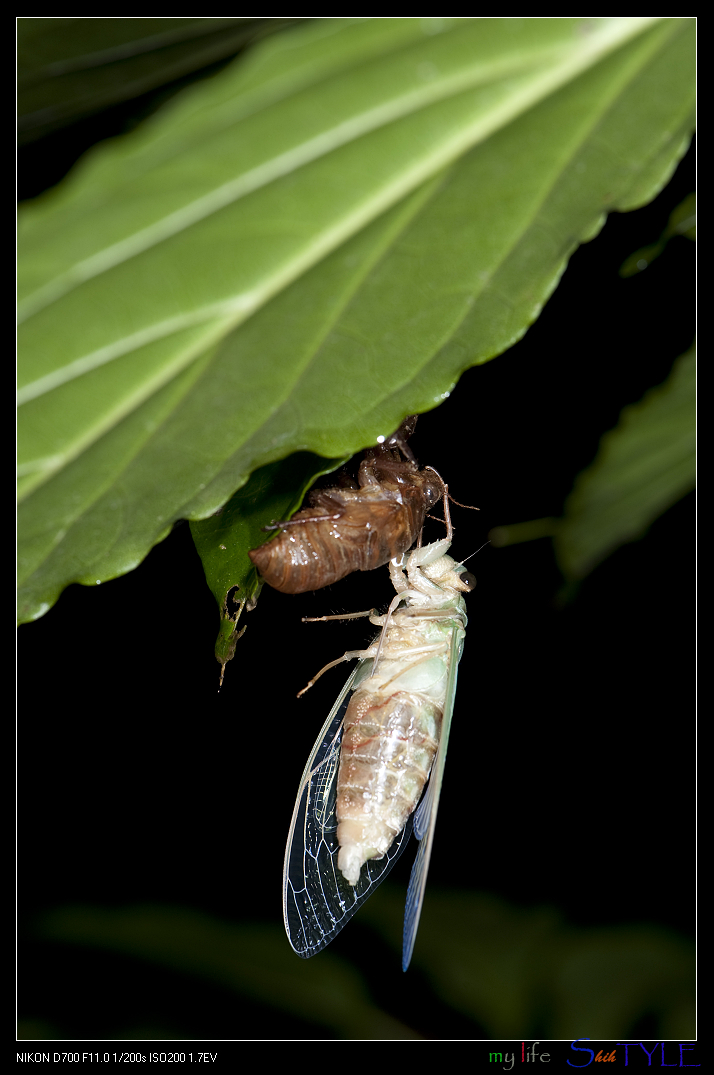
- Pomponia linearis teneral adult emerging

Scientific classification
- Kingdom: Animalia
- Phylum: Arthropoda
- Class: Insecta
- Order: Hemiptera
- Suborder: Auchenorrhyncha
- Family: Cicadidae
- Tribe: Cicadini
- Genus: Pomponia; Stål, 1866

= Pomponia (cicada) =

Genus of true bugs

Pomponia is a genus of Asian cicadas now placed in the monogeneric tribe Pomponiini Kato, 1932 (subfamily Cicadinae). About four species previously placed in Pomponia, containing the largest cicada species found on earth, have recently been moved to Megapomponia. However, the remaining species still form a very heterogeneous group and Duffels and Hayashi (2006) suggested that several species should probably be transferred to genera such as Terpnosia (e.g. P. similis); subsequent revisions include moves to Aetanna (e.g. P. thalia).

== Species ==
The World Auchenorrhyncha Database includes:

1. Pomponia brevialata Lee & Pham, 2015^{c g}
2. Pomponia brevicaudata Lee, 2013^{c g}
3. Pomponia bullata Schmidt, E., 1924^{c g}
4. Pomponia bulu Zaidi & Azman, 2000^{c g}
5. Pomponia cinctimanus (Walker, 1850)^{c g}
6. Pomponia cyanea Fraser, 1948
7. Pomponia daklakensis Sanborn, 2009^{c g}
8. Pomponia decem (Walker, 1857)
9. Pomponia dolosa Boulard, 2001 type species (as Cicada fusca Olivier, 1791 by subsequent designation)
10. Pomponia folei Fraser, 1948^{c}
11. Pomponia fugax Boulard, 2013^{c g}
12. Pomponia fusca Olivier, 1790^{g}
13. Pomponia gemella Boulard, 2005^{c g}
14. Pomponia gigantea Distant, 1897
15. Pomponia graecina Distant, 1889
16. Pomponia hieroglyphica Kato, 1938
17. Pomponia kiushiuensis Kato, 1925
18. Pomponia lactea (Distant, 1887)
19. Pomponia langkawiensis Zaidi & Azman, 1999
20. Pomponia linearis (Walker, 1850, zh)^{c g}
21. Pomponia mickwanae Boulard, 2009^{c g}
22. Pomponia minilinearis Boulard, 2013^{c g}
23. Pomponia nasanensis Boulard, 2005^{c g}
24. Pomponia noualhieri Boulard, 2005^{c g}
25. Pomponia orientalis (Distant, 1912)^{c g}
26. Pomponia parafusca Kato, 1944
27. Pomponia piceata Distant, 1905
28. Pomponia picta (Walker, 1870)
29. Pomponia polei Henry, 1931^{c g}
30. Pomponia ponderosa Lee, 2009^{c g}
31. Pomponia pornnapaae Boulard, 2013^{c g}
32. Pomponia promiscua Distant, 1887
33. Pomponia quadrispinae Boulard, 2002^{c g}
34. Pomponia rajah Moulton, 1923
35. Pomponia ramifera (Walker, 1850)^{c g}
36. Pomponia secreta Hayashi, 1978^{c g}
37. Pomponia solitaria Distant, 1888
38. Pomponia subtilita Lee, 2009 (synonym P. backanensis Thai & Yang, 2009
39. Pomponia surya Distant, 1904
40. Pomponia tricornisa Wang, Hayashi & Wei, 2025
41. Pomponia urania (Walker, 1850)^{c g}
42. Pomponia yayeyamana Kato, 1933^{c g}
43. Pomponia zakrii Zaidi & Azman, 1998^{c g}
44. Pomponia zebra Bliven, 1964^{c g}

Data sources: i = ITIS, c = Catalogue of Life, g = GBIF, b = Bugguide.net

Note: Pomponia siamensis China, 1925 is a nomen nudum.

== See also ==
- Pomponia
