= Semia =

Scientific classification
- Domain: Eukaryota
- Kingdom: Animalia
- Phylum: Arthropoda
- Class: Insecta
- Order: Hemiptera
- Suborder: Auchenorrhyncha
- Family: Cicadidae
- Subfamily: Cicadinae
- Tribe: Cicadini
- Genus: Semia; Matsumura, 1917

Genus of cicadas

External image
- Images at iNaturalist

Semia (from Japanese: 蝉, romanized: semi, lit. 'cicada') is a genus of Asian cicadas in the tribe Cicadini, erected by Matsumura in 1917.

== Species ==
The following are included by the Global Biodiversity Information Facility:

1. Semia albusequi Emery, Lee & Pham, 2017
2. Semia brevidilata Yang & Wei, 2014
3. Semia gialaiensis Pham & Constant, 2013
4. Semia hainanensis Yang & Wei, 2013
5. Semia klapperichi Jacobi, 1944
6. Semia lachna (Lei & Chou, 1997)
7. Semia magna Emery, Lee & Pham, 2017
8. Semia majuscula (Distant, 1917)
9. Semia pallida Emery, Lee & Pham, 2017
10. Semia spinosa Pham, Hayashi & Yang, 2012 - Vietnam
11. Semia spiritus Emery, Lee & Pham, 2017
12. Semia tibetensis Yang & Wei, 2014
13. Semia watanabei (Matsumura, 1907) - type species (as Leptopsaltria watanabei Matsumura, 1907)
