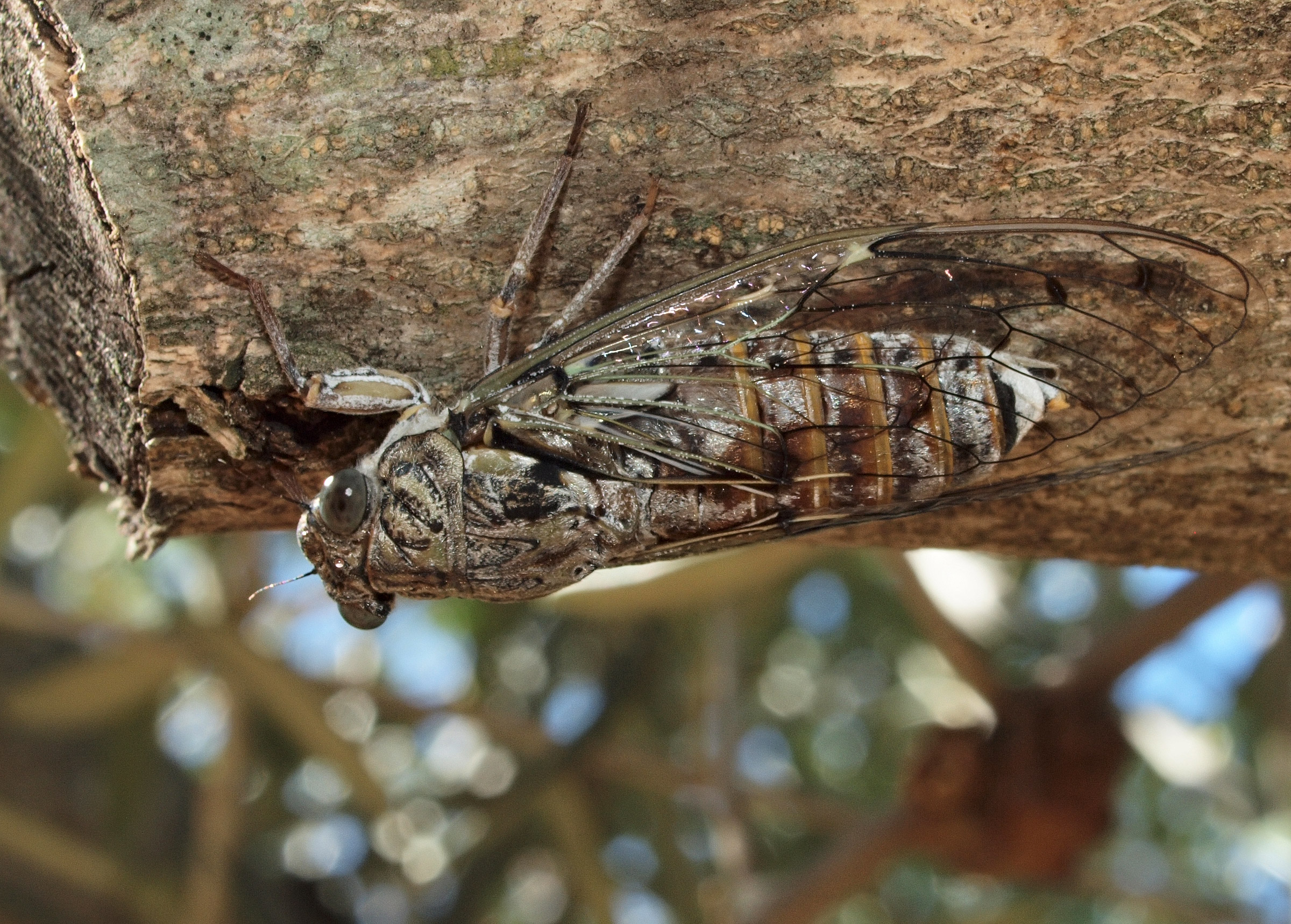
- Cicada barbara, dorsal view

Scientific classification
- Kingdom: Animalia
- Phylum: Arthropoda
- Clade: Pancrustacea
- Class: Insecta
- Order: Hemiptera
- Suborder: Auchenorrhyncha
- Family: Cicadidae
- Genus: Cicada
- Species: C. barbara

Binomial name
- Cicada barbara Stål, 1866

Synonyms
- Tettigia barbara Stål, 1866

= Cicada barbara =

Species of true bug

Cicada barbara is a species of cicada belonging to the family Cicadidae, subfamily Cicadinae, and the genus Cicada.

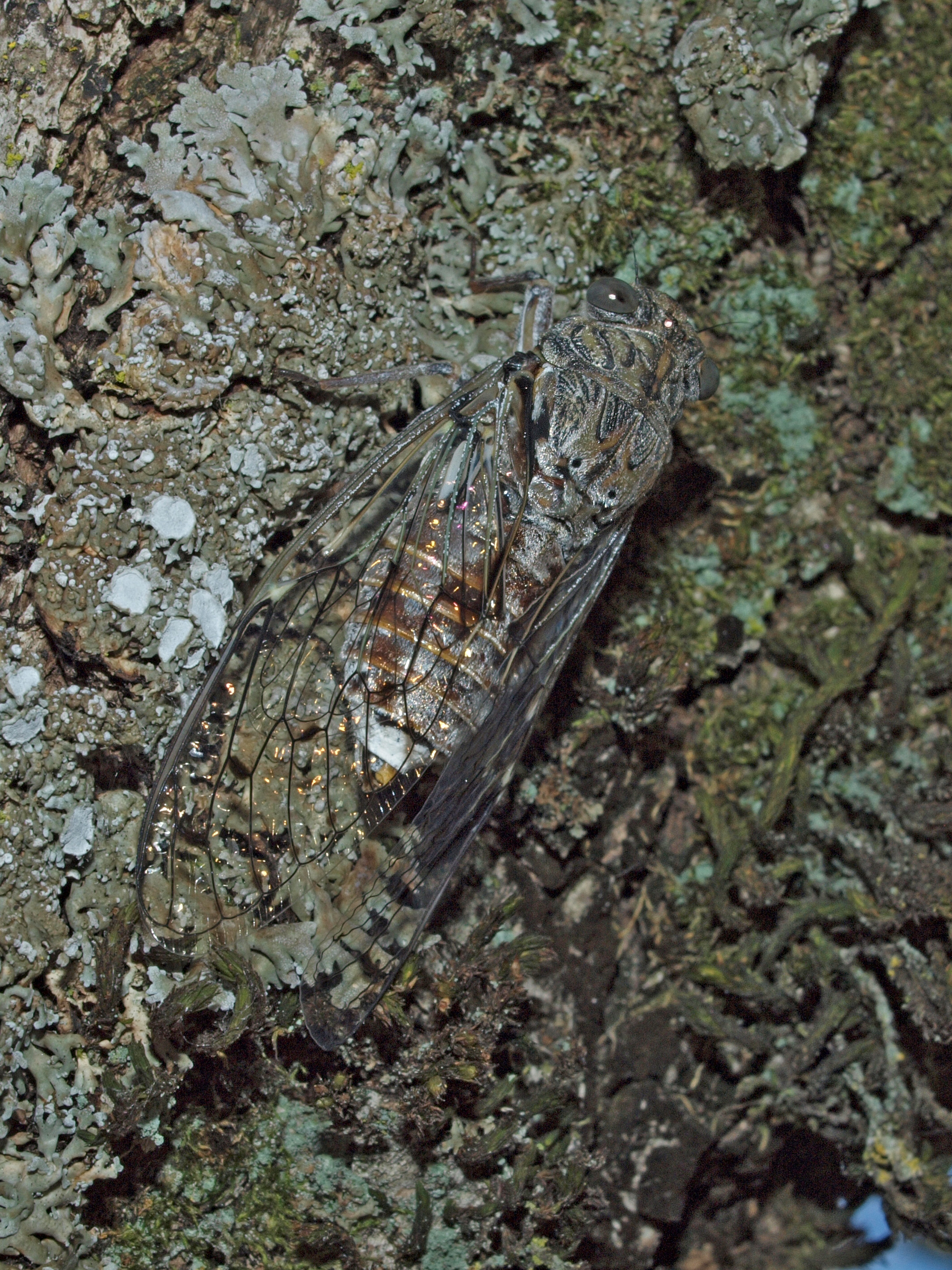
Cicada barbara

== Subspecies ==
- Cicada barbara lusitanica
