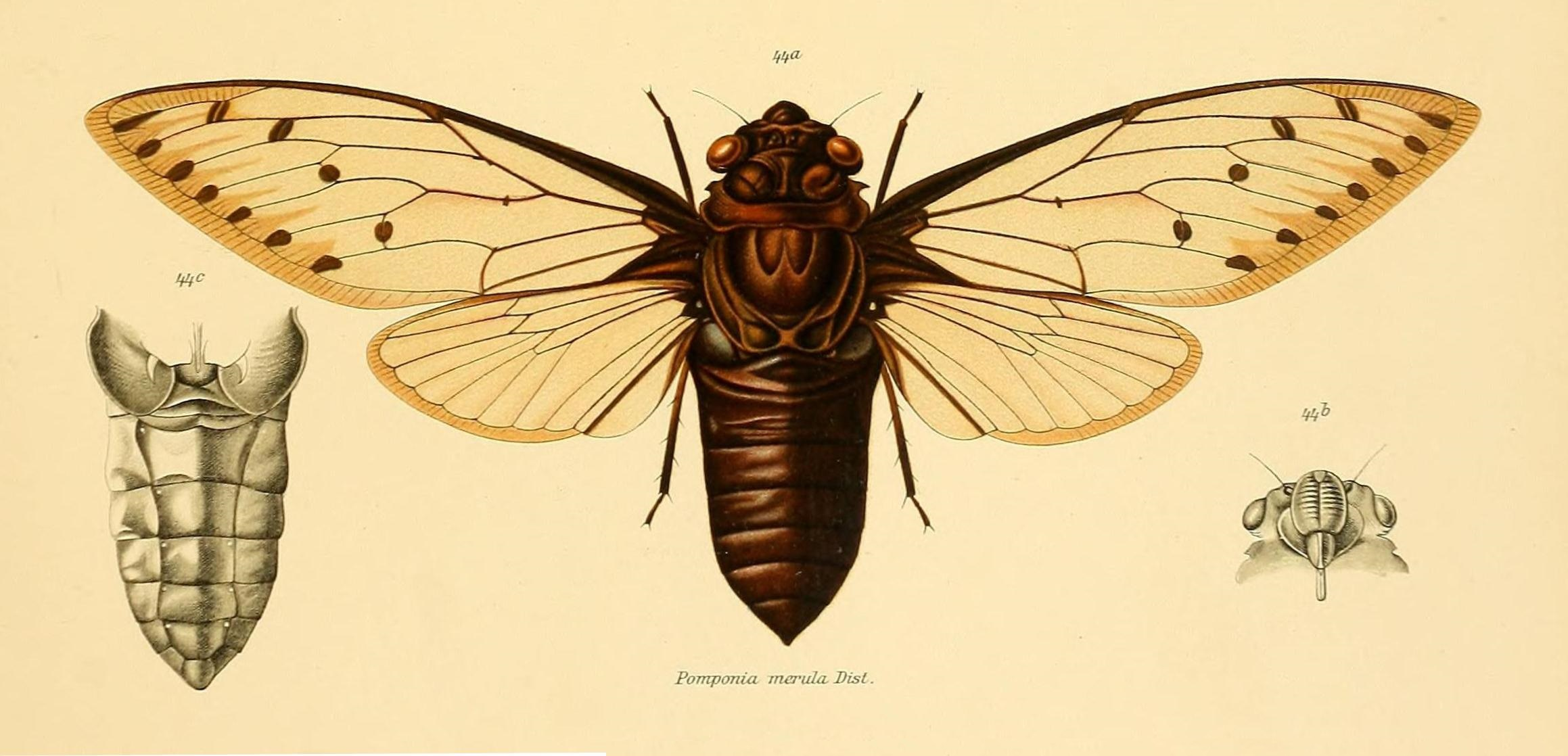
- Megapomponia merula, male

Scientific classification
- Domain: Eukaryota
- Kingdom: Animalia
- Phylum: Arthropoda
- Class: Insecta
- Order: Hemiptera
- Suborder: Auchenorrhyncha
- Family: Cicadidae
- Subfamily: Cicadinae
- Tribe: Dundubiini
- Genus: Megapomponia; Boulard, 2005

Species
- See text

= Megapomponia =

Genus of true bugs

Megapomponia is a genus of cicadas from Southeast Asia containing the world's largest cicada species. It now belongs to the subtribe Megapomponiina and was erected by Michel Boulard to accommodate the world's largest cicada species, Megapomponia imperatoria, the type species of Megapomponia. Boulard included seven species in Megapomponia. Lee and Sanborn, however, re-transferred two species to Pomponia, Pomponia decem and Pomponia rajah.

== Species ==
The World Auchenorrhyncha Database includes:

1. Megapomponia adusta (Walker, 1850)
2. Megapomponia atrotunicata Lee & Sanborn, 2010
3. Megapomponia bourgoini Pham & Constant, 2020
4. Megapomponia castanea Lee & Sanborn, 2010
5. Megapomponia clamorigravis Boulard, 2005
6. Megapomponia foksnodi Boulard, 2010
7. Megapomponia imperatoria (Westwood, 1842) - type species (as Cicada imperatoria Westwood)
8. Megapomponia intermedia (Distant, 1905)
9. Megapomponia macilenta Lee, 2012
10. Megapomponia merula (Distant, 1905)
11. Megapomponia pendleburyi (Boulard, 2001)
12. Megapomponia sitesi Sanborn & Lee, 2010
