= Basa (cicada) =

Scientific classification
- Kingdom: Animalia
- Phylum: Arthropoda
- Clade: Pancrustacea
- Class: Insecta
- Order: Hemiptera
- Suborder: Auchenorrhyncha
- Family: Cicadidae
- Genus: Basa; Distant, 1905
- Species: B. singularis

Binomial name
- Basa singularis (Walker, 1858)

Synonyms
- Dundubia singularis Walker, 1858; Pomponia singularis (Walker, 1858)

Genus of true bugs

Basa is a monotypic genus of cicadas in the tribe Psithyristriini. The single described species is Basa singularis. It is known from South Asia.
