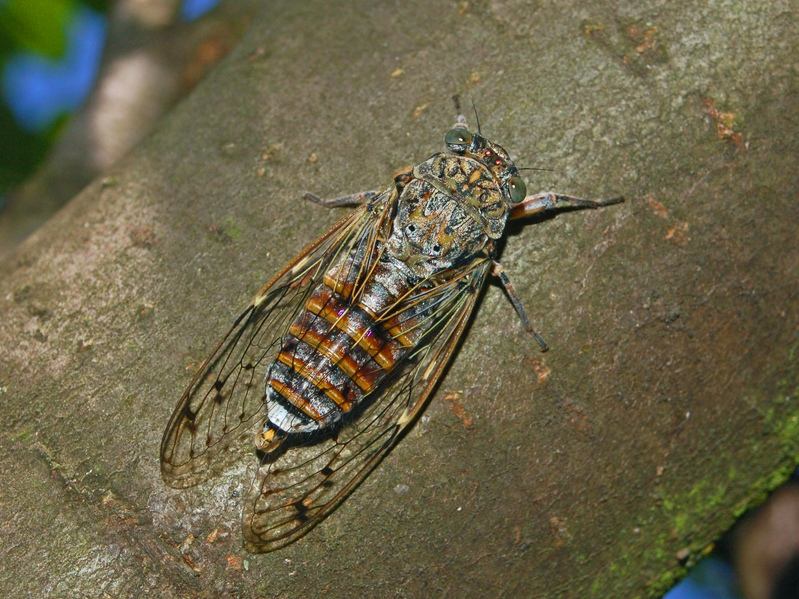
- Cicada orni, dorsal view

Scientific classification
- Kingdom: Animalia
- Phylum: Arthropoda
- Clade: Pancrustacea
- Class: Insecta
- Order: Hemiptera
- Suborder: Auchenorrhyncha
- Family: Cicadidae
- Genus: Cicada
- Species: C. orni

Binomial name
- Cicada orni Linnaeus, 1758

Audio

= Cicada orni =

Species of true bug

Cicada orni, colloquially called the common cicada or ash cicada, is the type species of cicada belonging to the family Cicadidae, subfamily Cicadinae, and the genus Cicada.

The genus name comes directly from the Latin cicada 'buzzer', while the species name orni possibly comes from Fraxinus ornus (Manna Ash or South European Flowering Ash), where this cicada often lay its eggs deep in branches.

== Description ==
Adult Cicada orni reach approximately 25 millimetres (0.98 in) in length, with a wingspan of about 70 millimetres (2.8 in). The cryptic coloration of the body varies from brown to gray. The abdomen has reddish segments and a silky pubescence. The head shows large and prominent eyes far apart on the sides, three small eyes (ocelli) located on the top, short antennae, and a long proboscis used for feeding on sap. The membranous front wings are transparent with several characteristic black spots.

== Habit ==
Adult cicadas can be encountered in summer feeding on sap from trees or shrubs, with their mouthparts well adapted for piercing and sucking.

Only males produce their calling song, a clicking sound caused by the contraction and relaxation of abdominal membranes (tymbal). This song has the function of sexual attraction for females. Usually males sing in aggregations of many individuals on sunny tree branches. When the males are approached by the females, the courtship takes place, in which cicadas repeatedly hug and touch each other with their legs. At the end of this process they mate in the same place.

The adult cicadas lay their eggs in the summer, which hatch in late summer or autumn. While their lifespan as adults lasts only about a month and a half for breeding, the larvae live for several years underground, feeding on the juices of plant roots.

== Distribution ==
This species is one of the most common in southern and central Europe, also in the Near East

== Gallery ==
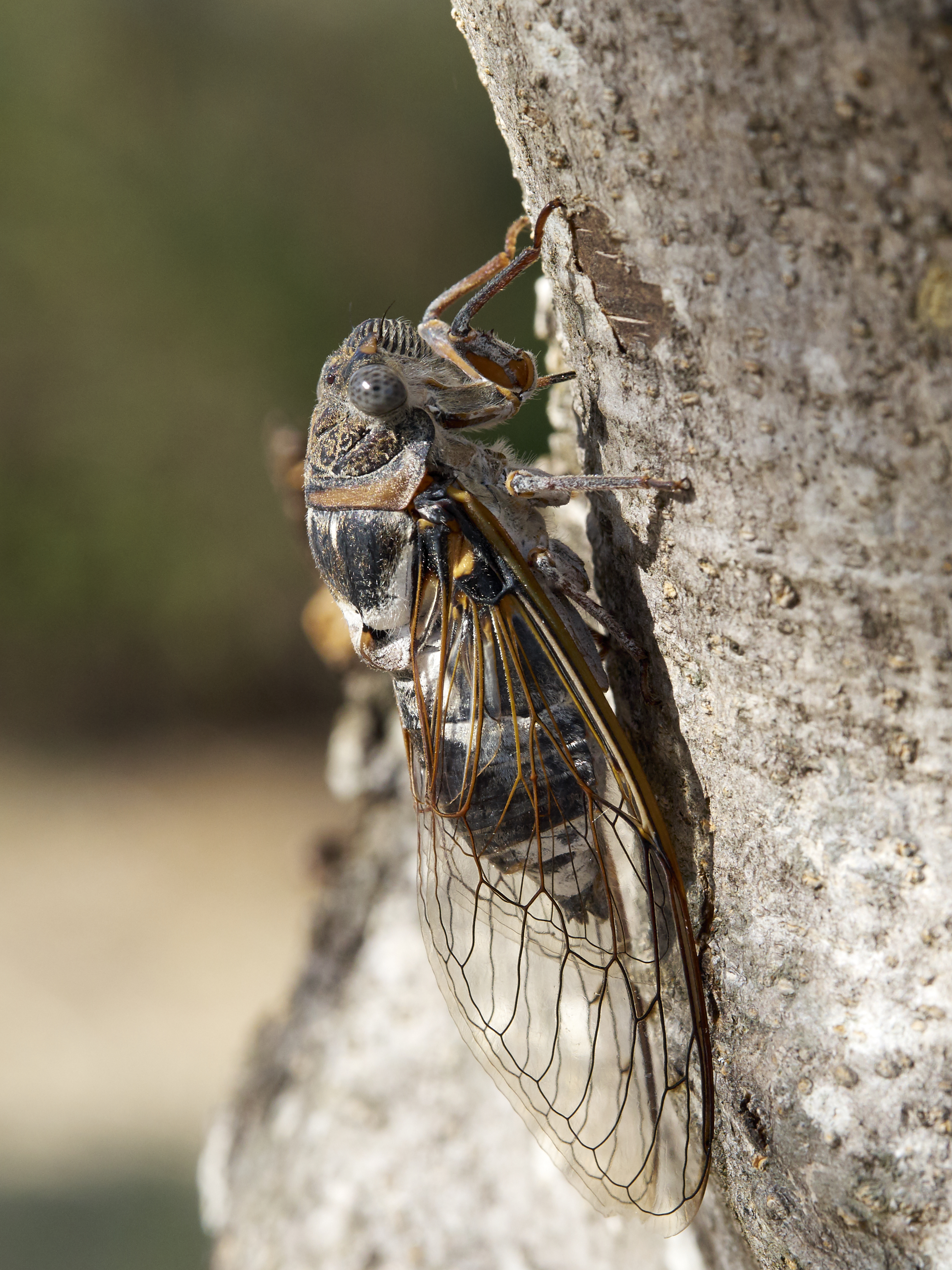
Cicada orni, side view

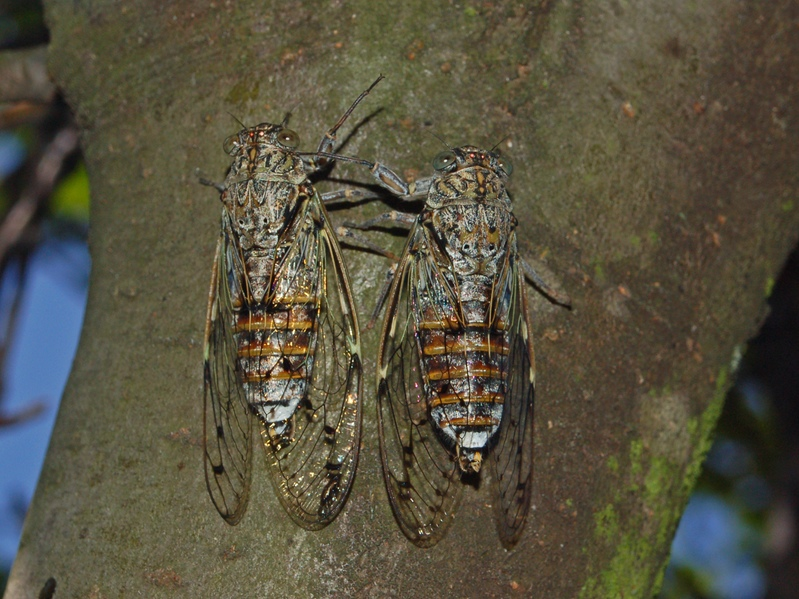
Cicada orni, the courtship

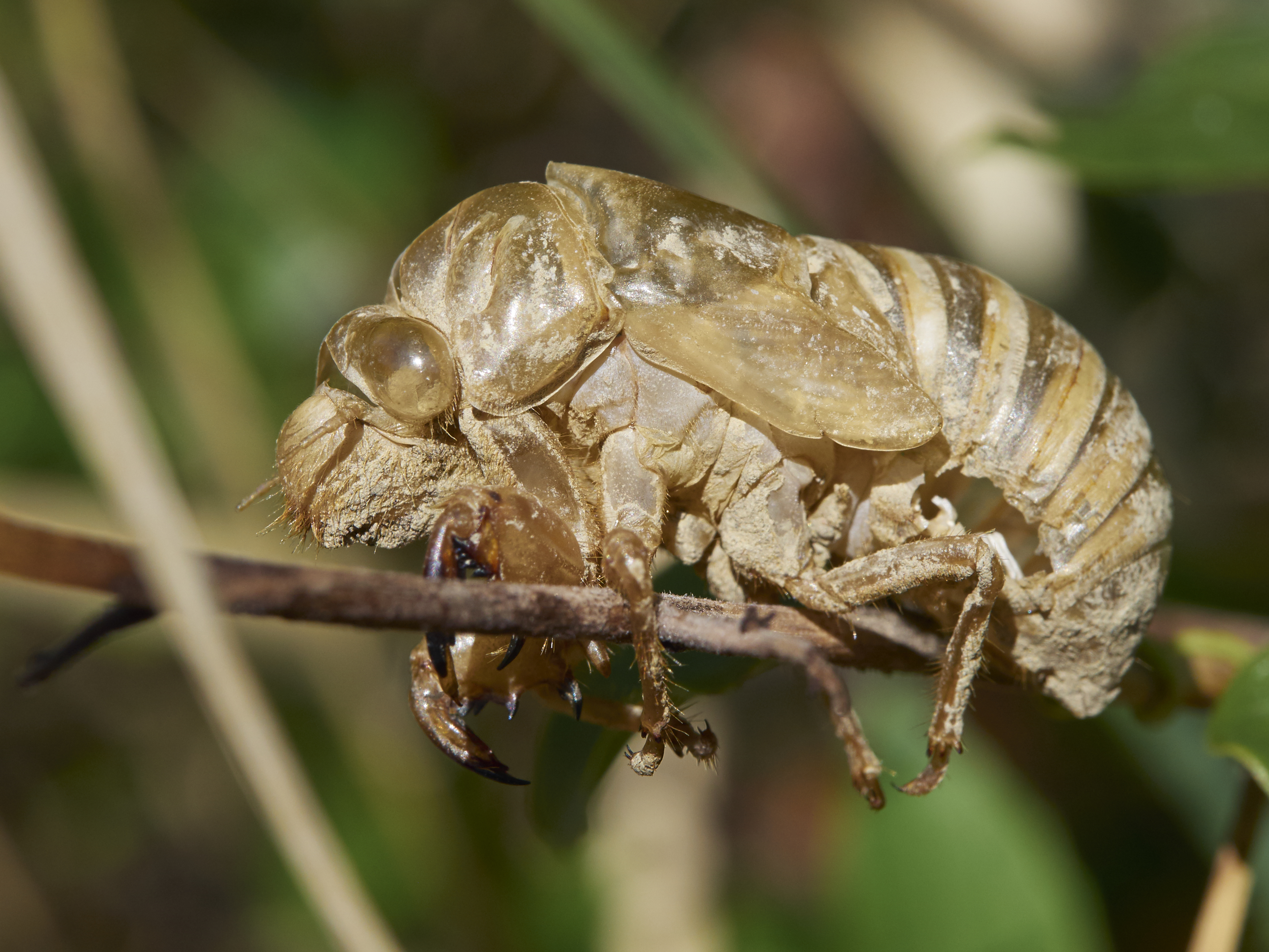
Exuvia of Cicada orni
