= Cornelia Butler Flora =

American rural sociologist

- Born: Cornelia Butler; August 5, 1943; Santa Monica, California, United States
- Died: April 30, 2025 (aged 81); Quinter, Kansas, United States
- Education: Cornell University (MS, Rural Sociology, 1966); University of California, Berkeley (BA, Sociology, 1965)
- Occupations: Sociologist, educator, author
- Years active: 1970–2025
- Known for: Community capitals framework, international research on community and rural development and social change.
- Title: Distinguished sociology professor emerita at Iowa State University and research professor at Kansas State University

Cornelia Butler Flora (August 5, 1943 – April 30, 2025) was an American rural sociologist. She is mostly known for her work on the community capitals framework (CCF), feminism in Latin America, social justice, social policy, women in development, rural development, sustainable agriculture, sustainable community, community development, and farmer welfare. She worked globally across the United States, Latin America, and Africa. There are more than 247 publications (in four languages) to her name over the last five decades of her work. Her widely cited book Rural Communities: Legacy + Change has seen 43 editions published between 1992 and 2019 in three languages. She was appointed in 2003 to the National Agricultural Research, Education and Economics Advisory Board by the then U.S. Secretary of Agriculture, Ann Veneman. She was also the president of the Rural Sociological Society in 1988–1989. She was a founding faculty member, from 2000 to 2013, of the Graduate Program in Sustainable Agriculture at Iowa State University.

== Biography ==
Flora served as a distinguished emerita professor of sociology at Iowa State University and research professor at Kansas State University. After retirement, in 2013, she continued to teach Rural Development in Spanish at the University of Córdoba (Spain).

She earned her doctorate in rural sociology (also known as Development Sociology) from Cornell University in 1970. Her doctoral dissertation was on the growth of the Pentecostal Movement in the rural Cauca Valley of Colombia compared to other religious and social groups. Her doctoral dissertation was published as the book Pentecostalism in Colombia: Baptism by Fire and Spirit and published in 1976. Previously, she earned her Master of Science in Rural Sociology from Cornell University in 1966. She earned her Bachelor of Arts with honors in Sociology from University of California, Berkeley in 1965. She taught and served in administrative positions at various universities, principally Iowa State University from 1994 to 2010 (where she also directed the North Central Regional Center for Rural Development between 1994 and 2010), Virginia Tech (formally the Virginia Polytechnic Institute and State University) from 1989 to 1994 (where she was head of the Department of Sociology), and Kansas State University from 1971 to 1989 (where she was also the Director of the Population Research Laboratory till 1978). She also served on the external advisory board of the Sustainable Intensification Innovation Lab based at Kansas State University, and was president of the Agriculture, Food and Human Values Society from 2002 - 2003

She married Jan L. Flora in 1967. They had met at Cornell University in 1965. Jan L. Flora is emeritus Professor of Sociology at Iowa State University and research professor of sociology at Kansas State University. Together they had two daughters- Gabriela and Natasha and three granddaughters.

She died of complications from pneumonia, on April 30, 2025, at the Gove County Medical Center in Quinter, Kansas.

== Contribution to rural sociology ==
The major contribution of Cornelia Flora to Rural Sociology is the Community Capitals Framework (CCF). It was co-developed with her husband Jan L. Flora. CCF links seven types of capitals (resources) necessary for promoting long-term development and well-being of communities. The seven types of community capitals are- natural, cultural, human, social, political, financial, and built- capital. The Floras consider that "growth focused only on financial capital generally increases inequality and environmental damage unless specific action is taken to protect ecosystem health and social inclusion. And, indeed, economic growth (alone) does not equal financial security for communities". Hence, favoring one or two types of capitals over other types of capitals could result in skewed development and decreased resilience at the community level. The distinguishing feature of CCF is that it focuses on different types of assets within the community. It does not focus on (asset) deficits. Thus, it is a significant shift in thinking (from have-nots/weaknesses to haves/strengths) and in approach towards community development (the development process is community-led and community-managed with critical support from state and market). In the words of the Floras- "The Community Capitals Framework emerged dialectically from practice, although it has diverse theoretical roots. Its theoretical base is rich and heterodox, bringing together symbolic structuralism, social constructivism, participatory action research, and appreciative inquiry. By focusing on collective efficacy, the CCF was developed as a tool for people in the field, including community members, to assess what key local resources to mobilize and invest in for a more sustainable collective future". CCF requires balanced investment in all seven capitals to achieve economic, social and environmental sustainability (also known as triple bottom line of development).

Natural Capital consists of the natural resources (land, air, water, flora, fauna) and the environment around the community. Cultural Capital consists of non-materials components (values, beliefs, norms and symbols) and material components (books, paintings, artifacts, etc.) of culture associated with the community or a social group. Human Capital consists of an individual's capabilities and knowledge facilitated through access to education, skills, health, enterprise, and holistic well-being. Social Capital consists of ties and bonding one has within one's family and with community members. The ties and bonds are based on mutual trust and reciprocity. This capital connects one with community members through a sense of collective identity, working together and a sense of shared future. Political Capital is the power to turn norms and values into rules and regulations that are enforced. These then influence decisions, policies, and resource allocation for the community. Financial Capital consists of revenue, income, savings, credits and cash at individual, firm and community level. At the community level, it can be viewed as financial resources (through formal and institutional sources) available within the community for the community development activities/projects. Community financial capital can be assessed by changes in poverty and equality, in firm efficiency, diversity of firms, and increased assets of local people. Built Capital consists of human-made infrastructure like roads, bridges, stations, parks, schools, hospitals, sewer system, business centers, etc. Built capital depends on the other capitals for access, use and maintenance.

== Contributions outside academia ==
From 1978 to 1981, she and her husband Jan worked for the Ford Foundation as Program Advisors for Agriculture and Rural Development in Latin America. During her Ford stint, she started women's programs in many countries (including those of Latin America, Central America, and Caribbean nations) and integrated thematic components related to women into all program areas of the Ford Foundation. She was an active promoter of entrepreneurial social infrastructure (community-based entrepreneurship). She wrote extensively for non-academics (policy makers and implementers) and practitioners on community entrepreneurship and innovations in community development. She had a long-standing association with Iowa Farmers Union.

== Recognition ==
She received the 2019 Richard P. Haynes Distinguished Lifetime Achievement Award in Agriculture, Food and Human Values from the Agriculture, Food and Human Values Society. The award honored her career for outstanding contributions towards higher education and human society through research, teaching, extension, public service and public policy. She was a fellow of the American Association for the Advancement of Science. She was an Endowed Chair in Sustainable Agricultural Systems at Minnesota Institute for Sustainable Agriculture (MISA), School of Agriculture, University of Minnesota from July 1999 to June 2000. She received the Distinguished Rural Sociologist Award in 1998 from the Rural Sociological Society. She received Outstanding Alumni Award from the College of Agriculture and Life Sciences at Cornell University in 1994. She delivered invited talks on the CCF at various prestigious institutions. The CCF has been widely covered in media and non-academic circles also over the years. For example- the recent podcast with Cornelia Flora on the seven community capitals by the popular platform Your Green Portal in March 2021, Talk with Authors at Iowa State University Library- Cornelia Flora talking on the CCF (starting at 22:30 minutes of the video) in March 2021. She also served as Treasurer of the Midwest Sociological Society in 1984 and was a lifetime member. She and Jan were conferred the Center for Rural Affairs Seventh Generation Award in 2024.

== Books ==
She authored/co-authored/edited more than a dozen books on rural communities, community development, sustainable agriculture, and development issues in Latin America.

- Community Capacity and Resilience in Latin America, 2020
- Rural Communities Legacy + Change, 5th Edition, 2016
- Rural Communities Legacy + Change, 4th Edition, 2013
- Rural Communities Legacy + Change, 3rd Edition, 2008
- Rural Communities Legacy + Change, 2nd Edition, 2004
- Interactions Between Agroecosystems and Rural Communities, 2001
- Rural Communities Legacy + Change, 1st Edition, 1992
- Rural Communities Legacy + Change: Study Guide, 1992
- Rural Communities Legacy + Change: Faculty Guide, 1992
- Rural Policies for the 1990s, 1991
- Sustainable Agriculture in Temperate Zones, 1990
- Pentecostalism in Colombia: Baptism by Fire and Spirit, 1976
