= Fern Kaley Willits =

American rural sociologist

- Education: Pennsylvania State University
- Known for: work on rural sociology, statistics
- Awards: Distinguished Rural Sociologist, Excellence in Instruction
- Scientific career
- Fields: Rural sociology, statistics
- Workplaces: Pennsylvania State University
- Thesis: An Exploratory Analysis of Individual and Social Level Meanings of Rurality (1964)
- Doctoral advisor: Robert C. Bealer

Fern "Bunny" Kaley Willits is an American sociologist and professor emerita at Pennsylvania State University known for research about rural women and youth. Willits has published over 70 academic papers and 14 books and she is recognized as a "distinguished rural sociologist" by the Rural Sociological Society.

== Career ==
Willits graduated as valedictorian from Coraopolis High School in Coraopolis, Pennsylvania in 1954. She earned her Bachelor of Science at Penn State in 1958, her Master of Science in 1961, PhD in 1964 under rural sociologist Robert C. Bealer with a dissertation titled An Exploratory Analysis of Individual and Social Level Meanings of Rurality. She has been a professor at the institution since 1964. She has published over 70 academic papers and 14 books, book chapters, and conference proceedings.

She is known for writing about rural women and youth, as well as rural demographic statistical studies.

=== Research ===
Willits studies public perceptions of social issues and she has engaged in a study of individuals' attitudes over 50 years. Her study Women in the Rural Sociological Society: A History is cited by the Rural Sociological Society. She has collaborated with the sociologists Carolyn Sachs and Don A. Dillman. Her research has included rural health, family relationships, race, gender, outdoor recreation, the role of religion in rural life, and differing perceptions of rurality/urbanity. Her 1993 article "The Rural Mystique and Tourism Development: Data from Pennsylvania" published in 1993 in which ideas of ideal rurality are assessed indicating that the bucolic ideals are held by low income, elderly, and rural individuals. The article was cited by Irene Kirkpatrick and Morag Mitchell in their book Rural Tourism and Sustainable Business. Some of Willits' research includes Pennsylvanians' perceptions of fossil fuels. Her 2009 article "Nonfamily youths temporarily employed in agriculture" was published in the Monthly Labor Review by the Bureau of Statistics.

== Awards ==
In 1988, Willits was given the Award for Excellence in Instruction by the Rural Sociological Society. In 1994, she was awarded the Gamma Sigma Delta Teaching Award. In 1995, she obtained the Penn State Alumni Association Teaching Fellow Award. In 1998, Willits was given the Award of Distinguished Rural Sociologist by the Rural Sociological Society. In 2019, the Dr. Fern "Bunny" Willits Graduate Award Endowment in Rural Sociology was established by two former statistics students to honor her contributions to the university and to the discipline of rural sociology, providing worthy Penn State candidates with $50,000 financial aid.

== Selected publications ==
- Willits, Fern K.; Luloff, A.E. (2010). "Urban Residents' Views of Rurality and Contacts with Rural Places". Rural Sociology. 60 (3): 454–466. doi:10.1111/j.1549-0831.1995.tb00583.x.
- "Gender and Ethnic Variations in Urban Park Preferences, Visitation, and Perceived Benefits" (PDF). NRPA.org. September 2005.
- Ryan, Andrea Kay; Willits, Fern K. (2007). "Family Ties, Physical Health, and Psychological Well-Being". Journal of Aging and Health. 19 (6): 907–920. doi:10.1177/0898264307308340. PMID 18165288. S2CID 6594745.
- Willits, Fern K.; Bealer, Robert C.; Timbers, Vincent L. (2010). "Popular Images of "Rurality": Data from a Pennsylvania Survey". Rural Sociology. 55 (4): 559–578. doi:10.1111/j.1549-0831.1990.tb00697.x.
- "Changes in Residents' Views of Natural Gas Drilling in the Pennsylvania Marcellus Shale, 2009–2012". ResearchGate. January 2013.
- Theodori, Gene L.; Willits, Fern K. (2019). "Rural and Small Town Residents and the Rural Mystique: Data from Texas". Rural Sociology. 84: 168–181. doi:10.1111/ruso.12227. S2CID 158497038.
