= Role homogeneity =

In sociology, role homogeneity is the degree of overlap amongst the different roles performed by different members of a community.

== Rural sociology ==
Rural sociologists often note that amongst rural communities there exists a very high degree of role homogeneity, that is, one person may perform the duties of banker, coach, deacon, school board member, and neighbor.

== Controversy ==
Sociologists have demonstrated that in areas of strong homogeneity, there is a general tendency to repress controversy. As a result, when disagreements arise, they can result in serious crises. Such communities tend to have local newspapers which are more oriented towards marketing, rather than news. What news is published, in a highly-homogeneous society, tends to focus on non-controversial topics and avoid "bad news".

== See also ==
- dramaturgy (sociology)
- rural sociology
- sociology
