= Paul Vogt =

Paul Vogt may refer to:

- Paul C. Vogt, American actor
- Paul L. Vogt, American rural sociologist
- Paul Vogt (historian) (born 1952), historian and politician from Liechtenstein
- Paul Vogt (pastor), Swiss Protestant pastor and theologian
