= Sociologia Ruralis =

- Discipline: Rural sociology
- Language: English

Publication details
- History: 1960-present
- Publisher: Wiley-Blackwell on behalf of the European Society for Rural Sociology.
- Frequency: Quarterly
- Impact factor: 1.022 (2012)

Standard abbreviations
- ISO 4: Sociol. Rural.

Indexing
- ISSN: 0038-0199 (print); 1467-9523 (web)
- LCCN: sf81003031
- OCLC no.: 714156511

Links
- Journal homepage; Online access; Online archive

Sociologia Ruralis is a quarterly peer-reviewed academic journal covering social-science research on rural areas and related issues with a focus on social, political and cultural aspects of rural development, including class, economics, government, and poverty. It was established in 1960 and is published by Wiley-Blackwell on behalf of the European Society for Rural Sociology.

According to the Journal Citation Reports, the journal has a 2012 impact factor of 1.022, ranking it 54th out of 137 journals in the category "Sociology".

== See also ==
- Rural sociology
