= Ralph B. Brown =

American sociologist and professor (1960–2014)

- Born: Ralph Browning Brown; January 25, 1960; Twin Falls, Idaho, U.S.
- Died: August 11, 2014 (aged 54); Springville, Utah, U.S.
- Education: Utah State University (B.A., M.A.); University of Missouri (Ph.D.)
- Known for: Community attachment, Rural sociology, International development
- Awards: Rural Sociological Society Excellence in Instruction Award (2004), BYU Alcuin Award (2005)
- Scientific career
- Fields: Sociology, Rural sociology, Community development
- Workplaces: Brigham Young University, Mississippi State University

Ralph Browning Brown (January 25, 1960 – August 11, 2014) was an American sociologist and professor at Brigham Young University (BYU), known for his work in rural sociology and community development.

His research focused on community attachment, rural economic development, and social change, particularly in the United States and Southeast Asia.

Brown served as executive director of the Rural Sociological Society from 2009 to 2014.

== Early life and education ==
Brown was born in Twin Falls, Idaho, and grew up in Utah. He earned his bachelor's and master's degrees in sociology from Utah State University in 1986 and 1988 respectively,. He completed a PhD. in rural sociology at the University of Missouri in 1992, where he researched community satisfaction and attachment.

His early experiences, including missionary work in Indonesia, influenced his interest in global rural development.

== Academic career ==
After completing his PhD., Brown became an assistant professor of sociology at Mississippi State University in 1992. He later joined Brigham Young University in 1998 as an associate professor and was promoted to full professor in 2005. At BYU, he served as associate chair of the Sociology Department between 2004 and 2007, and then as director of the undergraduate International Development minor between 2007 and 2014.

His philosophy underscored the role of relationships in education, arguing that joy is found in human connection rather than material success. This philosophy informed his teaching style, which fostered an inclusive and dynamic learning environment.

With an emphasis on experiential education, his style of education extended beyond the classroom. He frequently led student study abroad programs in Thailand, Vietnam, and Cambodia. His efforts contributed to the expansion of international development programs and the creation of a program evaluation training initiative for undergraduates at BYU.

== Research Contributions ==
Brown's research focused on rural communities and social change. He contributed to the conceptual distinction between community attachment and community satisfaction, demonstrating how emotional ties to a community influence social and economic behaviors.

His studies explored rural economic adaptation, including the informal economy of isolated communities. One of his key findings was that community attachment played a major role in residents' long-term commitment to rural towns. His research also informed policy discussions on rural migration and economic resilience.

His work demonstrated that rural communities do not simply "die", but evolve in ways that challenge traditional theories of community decline. He argued that long-term community attachments persist even when physical landscapes change — as in Harmony, Georgia, where a town submerged by a lake continued to hold social meaning for former residents. This insight reinforced his broader argument that community research must account for both objective structural changes and subjective social meanings.

Brown's work was influenced by the concept of community ideology and how individuals interpret their surroundings based on social and cultural assumptions. He emphasized how people develop fixed perceptions of community life—urban vs. rural, small town vs. suburban—before even experiencing them firsthand. This perspective shaped his research on community satisfaction and rural attachment, reinforcing the idea that perceptions often dictate reality more than objective conditions.

His international research centered on rural–urban interactions and the sociology of development in Southeast Asia. For instance, he studied how residents in Vietnam, Thailand, Cambodia, and India used motorcycles as economic tools to overcome infrastructure limitations, facilitating rural–urban migration and shaping new forms of economic mobility. He also critiqued how development interventions often ignore "spontaneous" local innovations that emerge outside official government policies.

His research was published in journals such as Rural Sociology, Community Development, Agriculture and Human Values, and American Journal of Sociology.

== Leadership in Rural Sociology ==
Brown was an active member of the Rural Sociological Society (RSS), attending annual meetings for over 25 years and mentoring students in the field. In 2009, he was appointed executive director and Treasurer of the RSS, where he worked to expand membership, modernize operations, and promote international collaboration.

He described rural sociology as an "intellectual crescent wrench", a tool that allowed him to address complex social issues through multiple theoretical approaches. He applied this philosophy in his work with the Mississippi Wildlife, Fisheries, and Parks Department, where he studied why Black female fishers in the Mississippi Delta struggled to access stocked reservoirs. His findings linked the issue not to a lack of fish, but to shifts in land ownership, race relations, and economic structures that had privatized traditional fishing grounds.

== Legacy ==
In December 2013, while battling pancreatic cancer, he delivered a final lecture titled One Last Lecture, in which he reflected on thirteen principles that had shaped his teaching and personal philosophy. Among these principles, he emphasized the search for truth, the importance of intellectual humility, and the value of stepping outside one's cultural and intellectual "box". Following his passing, Brown's final lecture was widely shared within the BYU community, and his insights on critical thinking and global awareness continued to inspire students and colleagues.

Brown died of pancreatic cancer on August 11, 2014, in Springfield, Utah, at the age of 54. His contributions to rural sociology and community development continue to influence research and policy in these subdisciplines.

He played a key role in expanding international collaborations within the Rural Sociological Society and making rural sociology a more globally connected discipline. The RSS established the Ralph B. Brown Scholar Paper Competition to support student research in rural sociology. In addition to this, Brown was recognized by the RSS for his contributions to rural sociology and student mentorship. In 2004, he received the RSS Excellence in Instruction Award, highlighting his impact as an educator.

At BYU, his legacy is honored through a permanent endowment supporting student experiential learning in international development and sociology. The scholarship reflects Brown's passion for real-world education.
