= Paul L. Vogt =

American rural sociologist (born 1878)

Paul Leroy Vogt
- Born: May 28, 1878; Upper Sandusky, Ohio, United States
- Died: Unknown
- Occupation: Rural Sociologist
- Years active: 1906–1945

Paul Leroy Vogt (born 1878) is an American rural sociologist, empirical researcher, and a founding member of the Rural Sociological Society. During his lengthy career he published numerous papers and books on rural life, economics, and morality.

== Early life ==
Vogt was born in Upper Sandusky, Ohio on May 28, 1878. He received his Bachelor of Arts from Ohio Northern University in 1901. He then received his Ph.D. as a Harrison Fellow in Pennsylvania in 1907.

== Career ==
Vogt's career spanned many organizations included academia, government, and religious institutions. Between 1908 and 1909 he was employed as an expert and special agent for the United States Bureau of Labor and Corporations. From 1911 until 1915 he was a professor and head of the Department of Sociology at Miami University in Oxford, Ohio. On July 1, 1915, he was hired as a professor and the head of the Department of Rural Economics at Ohio State University until he resigned on January 1, 1917. For the next eight years he was employed as the superintendent of rural work for the Board Home Missions and Church Extension Office of the Methodist Episcopal Church. From 1933 to 1936 he was the regional director at the Workers Educational Bureau of America and from 1936 until 1939 he was the senior agricultural economist for the Agricultural Adjustment Administration at the USDA.

Vogt is often considered one of the founders of Rural Sociology. He attended an annual meeting of the American Sociological Society in 1916 where the theme was rural life. Twelve attendees, including Kenyon Butterfield and Charles Galpin, decided to continue to gather informally on an annual basis. This group eventually founded the Rural Sociological Society. Vogt defined Rural Sociology as "...the study of the forces and conditions of rural life as a basis for constructive action in developing and maintaining a scientifically efficient civilization in the country."

== Major contributions ==
=== Farmer's Labor Income ===
In December 1916 Vogt published The Farmer's Labor Income in The American Economic Review. In it, Vogt empirically compares the income of farmers to that of people living in urban areas. His focus was on the central and upper midwest and he further breaks down the economic conditions of various groups in these regions: absentee landlords, owner-farmers, tenant farmers, and farm laborers. Ultimately, he concludes that labor income of farmers is comparable to those of urban areas; however, an economic trend in favor absentee landlords presents an existential threat to the rural Midwest. This trend was due to the fact that the majority of income increases was coming in the form of land value which only benefited absentee landlords and owner-farmers. This had the further effect of making it more difficult for tenant farmers to become owner-farmers because the land was becoming more expensive, but tenant farmer incomes were stagnant or growing slower. Therefore, the number of tenant farmers was increasing.

=== The Land Problem and Rural Welfare ===
In 1916, Vogt published his paper The Land Problem and Rural Welfare in Volume 11 of the Publications of the American Sociological Society. The paper reemphasizes his work in Farmer's Labor Income and restates his position that arresting the economic trends that are mostly benefiting absentee landlords is paramount to a productive and happy rural society. Furthermore, Vogt goes on to explain that the increasing number of tenant farmers has detrimental effects on both the lives of those farmers as well as the quality of the food they produce. Tenant farmer residences were more likely to be heated by a stove, lit by kerosene, not have kitchen sinks, and have water wells that were closer to their outhouse and barn. Additionally, the quality of produce from tenant farms was consistently lower and tenant farms tended to spend less on fertilizer. In order to resolve this issue Vogt advocated for the creation of a tax scheme that encouraged absentee landlords to reduce their holdings in order to increase the number of owner-farmers.

=== Introduction to Rural Sociology ===
In 1922, Vogt published Introduction to Rural Sociology. The book is one of the first text books ever published in the field and covers topics such as rural life, organizations, attitudes, economics, and institutions.

== Published works ==
- Ohio Rural Life Survey in Southwestern Ohio (1913)
- A Rural Life Survey of Greene and Clermont Counties, Ohio (1914)
- Rural Morality, a Study in Social Pathology (1915)
- The Farmer's Labor Income (1916)
- The Land Problem and Rural Welfare (1916)
- Introduction to Rural Sociology (1922)
- Introduction to Rural Economics (1925)
