= Rural ghetto =

Small towns in US with influx of poverty

The term rural ghetto describes the influx of poverty and neglect in the small towns of Midwestern, South Central United States, Southeastern United States and Northeastern United States.

According to an April 1993 review of the book by Fred Magdoff, rural ghettos are often "omitted from most people's conception of poverty." Generally, "rural poverty is less visually dramatic than urban poverty--poorly insulated mobile homes and weather-beaten single family houses look almost quaint compared to urban tenements." Magdoff goes on to point out the reality of poverty in rural areas does not fit a common conception of idyllic farms. In contrast to urban areas and inner city neighborhoods, most of the "rural ghettos" are mostly white, though a large number of predominantly black towns in the Southern U.S. fit this particular profile. Jackson County, Kentucky in the Appalachia region was featured on an April 2009 segment on ABC news program 20/20 about rural poverty.

== See also ==
- Poverty in the United States
- Reservation poverty
- Rural development
- Rural flight
- Rural sociology
