= Rural Sociology (journal) =

- Discipline: Rural sociology
- Language: English
- Edited by: Carol J. Ward

Publication details
- History: 1936-present
- Publisher: John Wiley & Sons for the Rural Sociological Society
- Frequency: Quarterly
- Impact factor: 4.078 (2020)

Standard abbreviations
- ISO 4: Rural Sociol.

Indexing
- ISSN: 0036-0112 (print); 1549-0831 (web)
- LCCN: sf86091841
- OCLC no.: 01604686

Links
- Journal homepage; Online access; Online archive; Free online archive (1936-1989)

Rural Sociology is a quarterly peer-reviewed academic journal covering rural sociology. It was established in 1936 and is the official journal of the Rural Sociological Society. It is published by John Wiley & Sons and the editor-in-chief is Carol J. Ward (Brigham Young University). According to the Journal Citation Reports, the journal has a 2020 impact factor of 4.078, ranking it 17th out of 149 journals in the category "Sociology".
