= Rural area =

Geographic area outside towns and cities

Joshua Shaw's 1823 painting View in the Pennsylvania Countryside. The U.S. state of Pennsylvania is known for its history of rural communities along the Susquehanna River, including those of Quakers and Amish.

A rural area, also known as the country or countryside, is a geographic area that is located outside towns and cities. Typical rural areas have a low population density and small settlements. Agricultural areas and areas with forestry are typically described as rural, as well as other areas lacking substantial development. Different countries have varying definitions of rural for statistical and administrative purposes.

Rural areas have unique economic and social dynamics due to their relationship with land-based industry such as agriculture, forestry, and resource extraction. Rural economics can be subject to boom and bust cycles and vulnerable to extreme weather or natural disasters, such as droughts. These dynamics alongside larger economic forces encouraging urbanization have led to significant demographic declines, called rural flight, where economic incentives encourage younger populations to go to cities for education and access to jobs, leaving older, less educated, and less wealthy populations in the rural areas. Slower economic development can result in poorer services like healthcare, education, and infrastructure. This cycle of poverty contributes to why three quarters of the global impoverished live in rural areas according to the Food and Agricultural Organization.

Some communities have successfully encouraged economic development in rural areas, with policies such as increased access to electricity or internet. Historically, development policies have focused on larger extractive industries, such as mining and forestry. However, recent approaches focused on sustainable development take into account economic diversification in these communities.

== Regional definitions ==
=== North America ===
==== Canada ====
In Canada, the Organization for Economic Co-operation and Development defines a "predominantly rural region" as having more than 50% of the population living in rural communities where a "rural community" has a population density less than 150 people per square kilometre. In Canada, the census division has been used to represent "regions" and census consolidated sub-divisions have been used to represent "communities". Intermediate regions have 15 to 49 percent of their population living in a rural community. Predominantly urban regions have less than 15 percent of their population living in a rural community. Predominantly rural regions are classified as rural metro-adjacent, rural non-metro-adjacent and rural northern, following Philip Ehrensaft and Jennifer Beeman (1992). Rural metro-adjacent regions are predominantly rural census divisions which are adjacent to metropolitan centres while rural non-metro-adjacent regions are those predominantly rural census divisions which are not adjacent to metropolitan centres. Rural northern regions are predominantly rural census divisions that are found either entirely or mostly above the following lines of latitude in each province: Newfoundland and Labrador, 50th; Manitoba, 53rd; Alberta, British Columbia, Ontario, Quebec, and Saskatchewan, 54th. As well, rural northern regions encompass all of the Yukon, Northwest Territories and Nunavut.

Statistics Canada defines rural areas by their population counts. This has referred to the population living outside settlements of 1,000 or fewer inhabitants. The current definition states that census rural is the population outside settlements with fewer than 1,000 inhabitants and a population density below 400 people per square kilometre.

==== United States ====
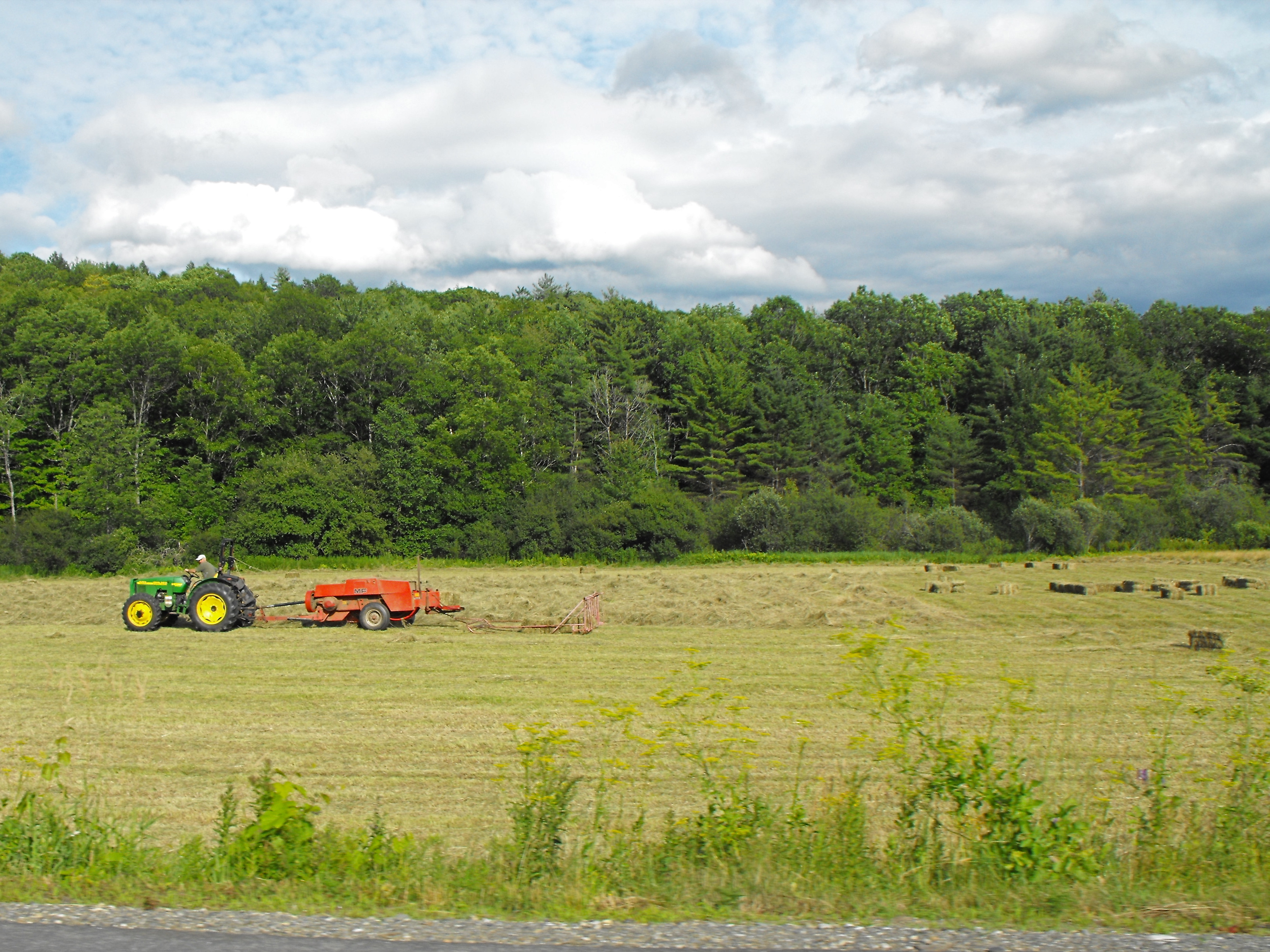
Westminster, Vermont

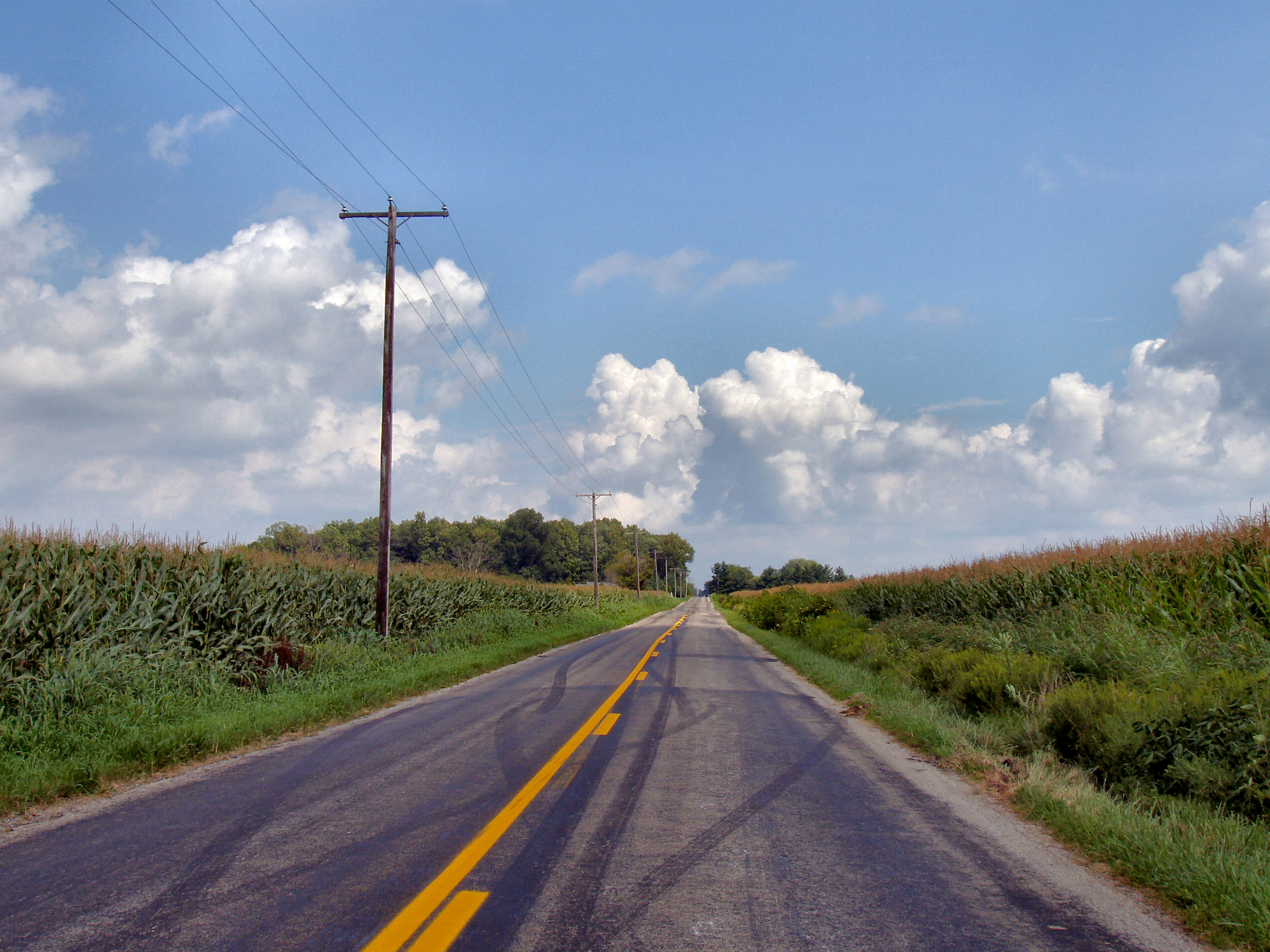
A rural country road in Marshall County, Indiana

Rural areas in the United States, often referred to as rural America, consist of approximately 97% of the United States' land area. An estimated 60 million people, or one in five residents (17.9% of the U.S. population), live in rural America. Definitions vary from different parts of the United States government as to what constitutes those areas.

Rural areas tend to be poorer and their populations older than in other parts of the United States because of rural flight, declining infrastructure, and fewer economic prospects. The declining population also results in less access to services, such as high-quality medical and education systems.

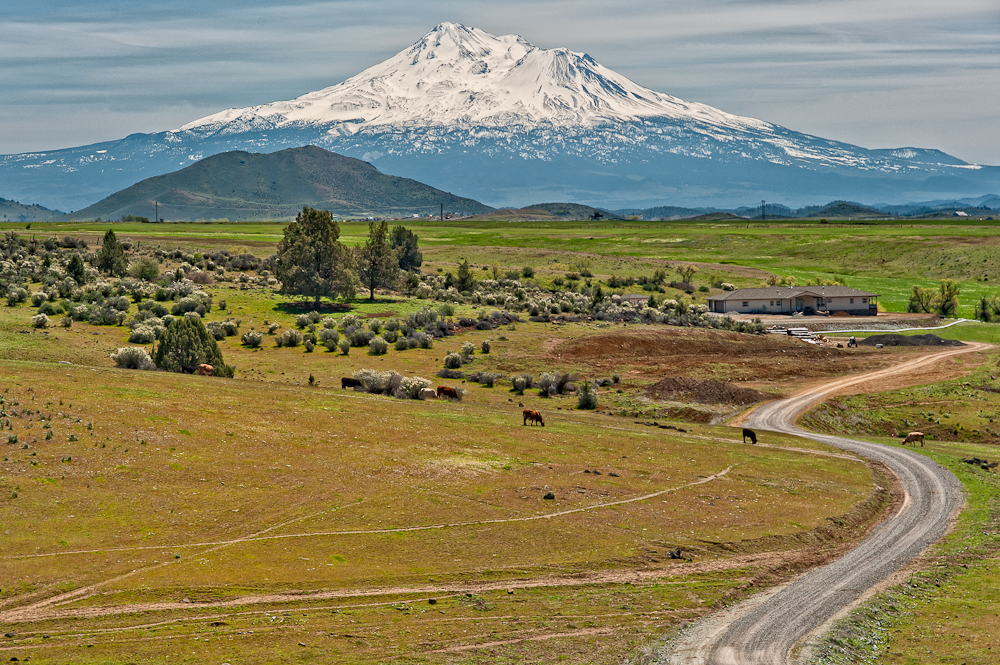
A rural landscape near Mount Shasta in California

=== South America ===
==== Brazil ====
A rural area in the Brazilian state of Rio de Janeiro

In Brazil, there are different notions of "rural area" and "countryside". Rural areas are any place outside a municipality's urban development (buildings, streets) and it is carried by informal usage. Otherwise, countryside (interior in Portuguese) are officially defined as all municipalities outside the state/territory capital's metropolitan region. Some states as Mato Grosso do Sul do not have any metropolitan regions, thus all of the state, except its capital is officially countryside. Rio de Janeiro is singular in Brazil and it is de facto a metropolitan state, as circa 70% of its population are located in Greater Rio. In the Federal District it is not applicable and there is no countryside as all of it is treated as the federal capital. Brasília is nominally the capital, but the capitality is shared through all Federal District, because Brazil de facto defines its capital as a municipality, and in municipal matters, the Federal District is treated and governs as a single municipality, city-state-like (Brasília, DF).

=== Europe ===
==== France ====
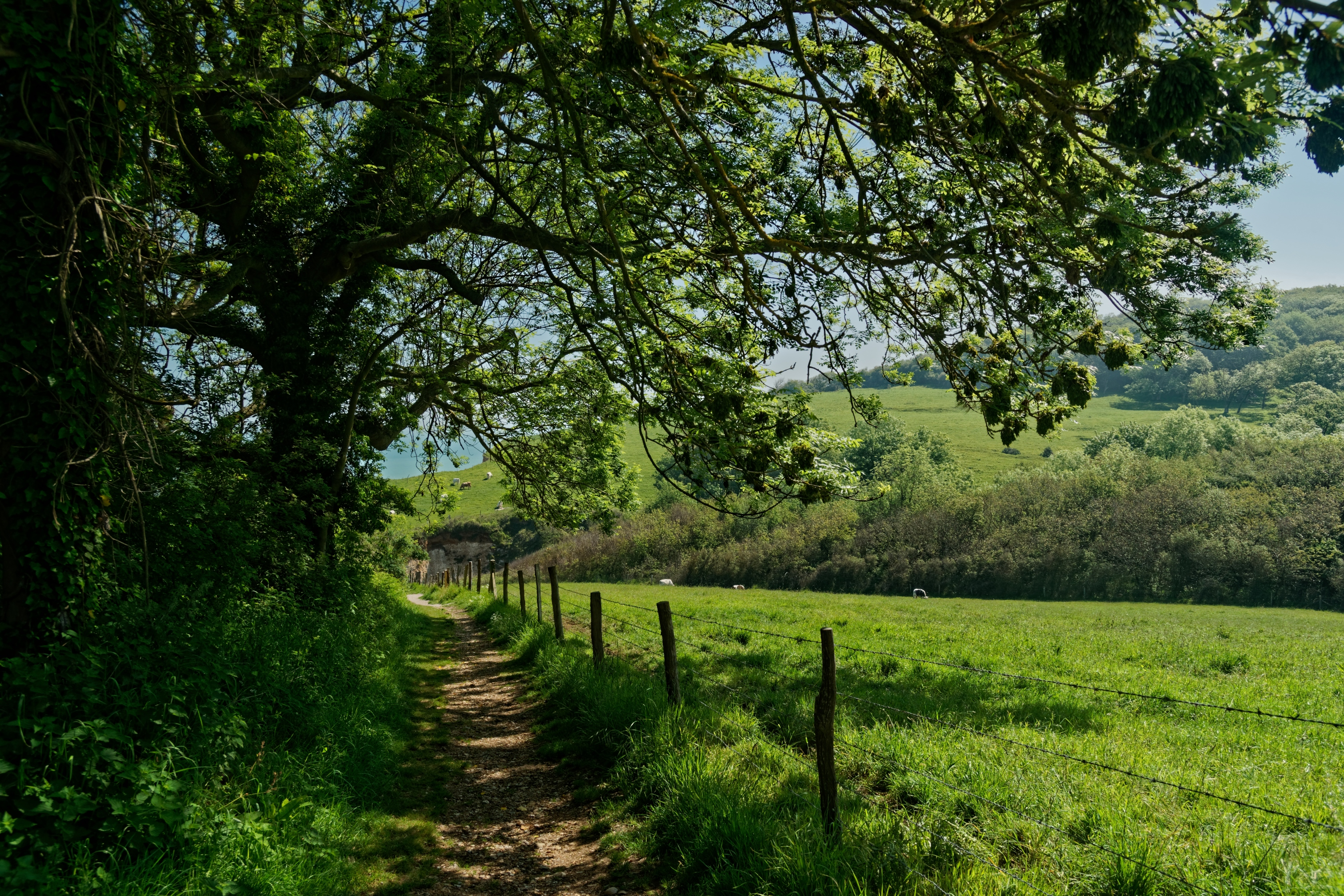
A rural area in Northern France

15% of the French population lives in rural areas, spread over 90% of the country. The government under President Emmanuel Macron launched an action plan in 2019 amid the yellow vests movement in favor of rural areas named the "Agenda Rural". Among many initiatives recommended to redynamize rural areas, energy transition is one of them. Research is being carried out to assess the impact of new projects in rural areas.

In 2018, the government had launched the "Action Cœur de Ville" program to revitalize town centers across the country. 222 towns were selected as part of the five-year program. One of the program's aims is to make the towns attractive so the areas nearby can also benefit from investments.

==== Germany ====
Germany is divided into 402 administrative districts, 295 rural districts and 107 urban districts. As one of the largest agricultural producers in the European Union, more than half of Germany's territory which is almost 19 million hectares, is used for farming, and located in the rural areas. Almost 10% of people in Germany have jobs related to the agricultural, forest and fisheries sectors; approximately a fifth of them are employed in the primary production. Since there is a policy of equal living conditions, people see rural areas as equivalent as urban areas. Village renewal is an approach to develop countryside and supports the challenges faced in the process of it.

==== United Kingdom ====
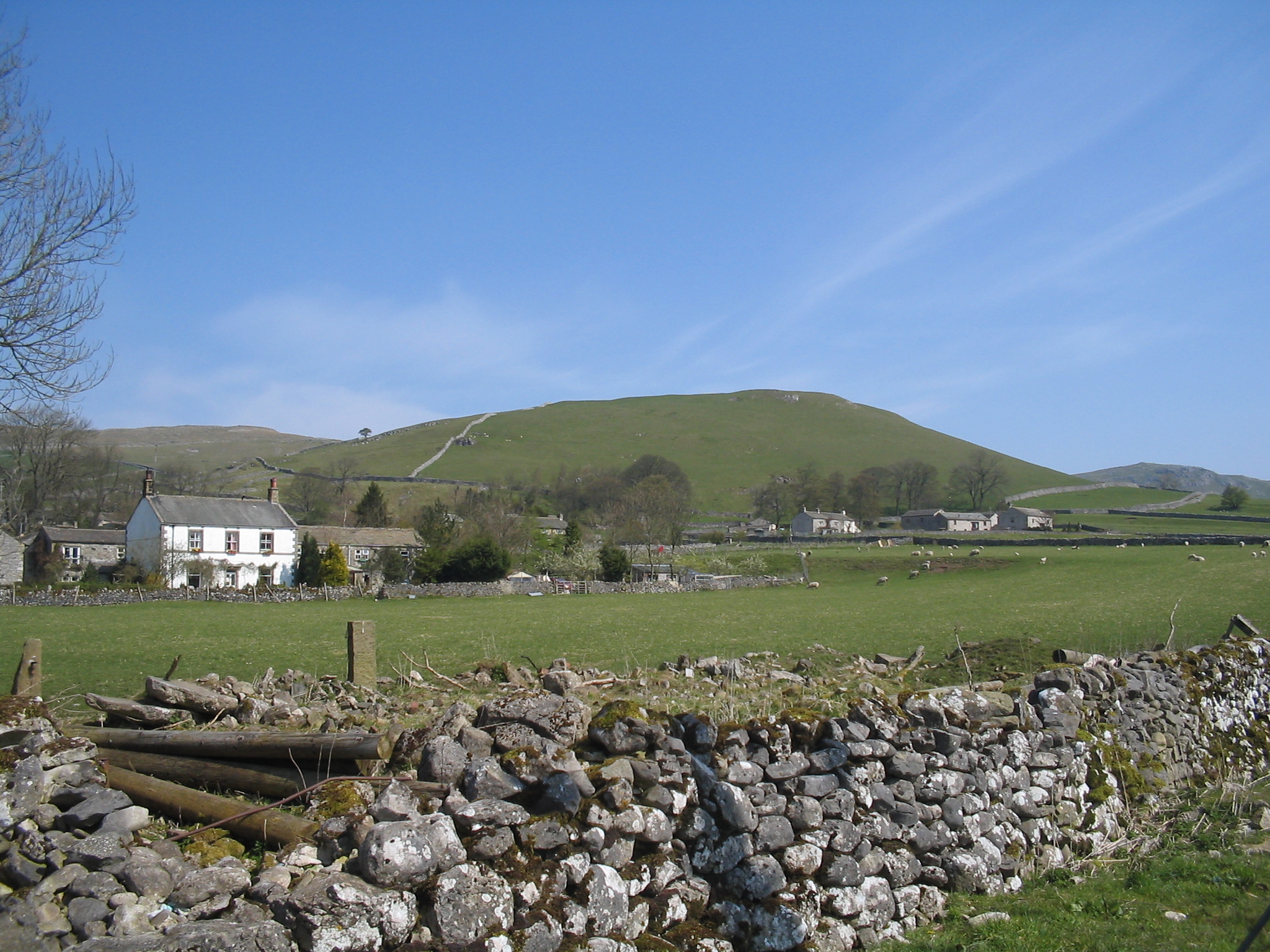
Rural Yorkshire Dales in England

In Britain, there are various definitions of a rural area. "Rural" is defined by the UK Department for Environment, Food and Rural Affairs (DEFRA), using population data from the latest census, such as the United Kingdom Census 2001. These definitions have various grades, but the upper point is any local government area with more than 26% of its population living in a rural settlement or market town ("market town" being defined as any settlement which has permission to hold a street market). A number of measures are in place to protect the British countryside, including green belts.

=== Asia ===
==== China ====
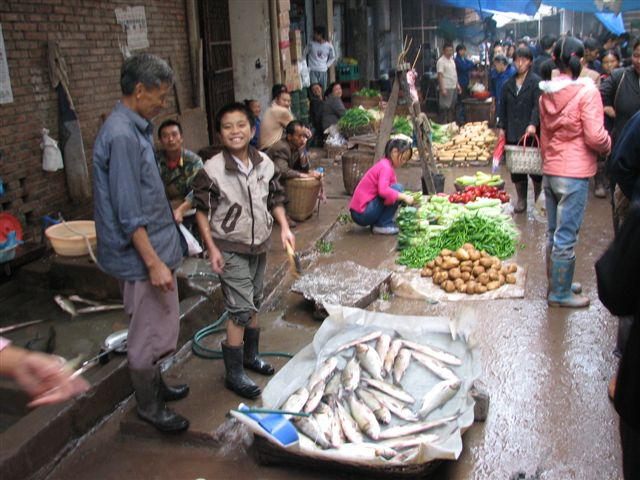
Fish farmer at peasant market in Danshan, Sichuan in September 2005

Rural society in the People's Republic of China encompasses less than half of China's population (roughly 45%) and has a varied range of standard of living and means of living. Life in rural China differs from that of urban China. In southern and coastal China, rural areas are developing and, in some cases, statistically approaching urban economies. In northwest and western regions, rural society is still perceived as lowly and primitive. Basic needs such as running water and accessible transportation are a problem in these areas.

==== India ====
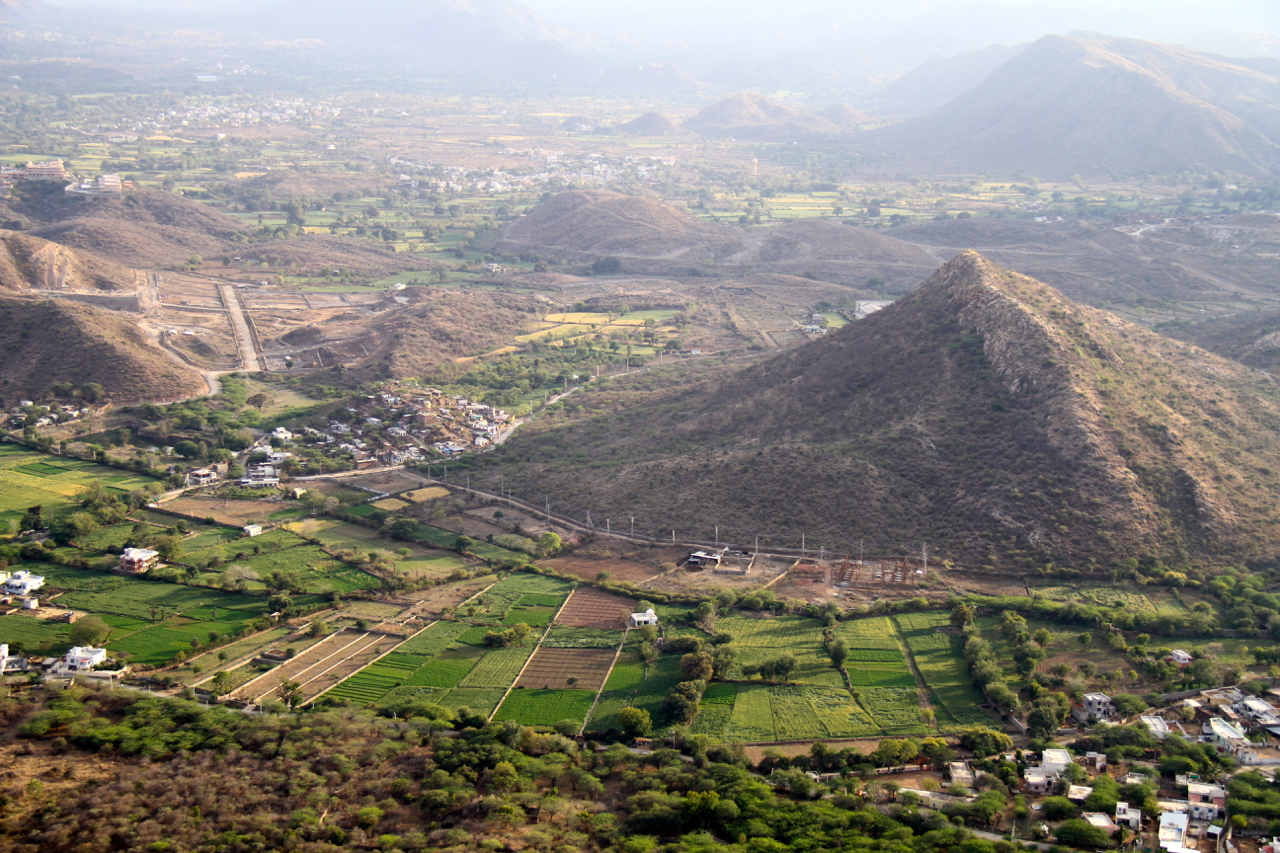
A rural village in Rajasthan, India

In India a village tends to mean a small rural area, including both a settlement and its surrounding agricultural land, rather than just the settlement itself, the typical meaning elsewhere. There are said to be up to 500,000 villages in India. In rural areas, agriculture is the chief source of livelihood along with fishing, cottage industries, pottery etc.

Almost every Indian economic agency today has its own definition of rural India, some of which follow: According to the Planning Commission, a town with a maximum population of 15,000 is considered rural in nature. In these areas the panchayat makes all the decisions. There are five people in the panchayat. The National Sample Survey Organization (NSSO) defines 'rural' as follows:

- An area with a population density of up to 400 per square kilometer,
- Villages with clear surveyed boundaries but no municipal board,
- A minimum of 75% of male working population involved in agriculture and allied activities.

RBI defines rural areas as those areas with a population of less than 49,000 (tier -3 to tier-6 cities).

It is generally said that the rural areas house up to 70% of India's population. Rural India contributes a large chunk to India's GDP by way of agriculture, self-employment, services, construction etc. As per a strict measure used by the National Sample Survey in its 63rd round, called monthly per capita expenditure, rural expenditure accounts for 55% of total national monthly expenditure. The rural population currently accounts for one-third of the total Indian FMCG sales.

==== Japan ====
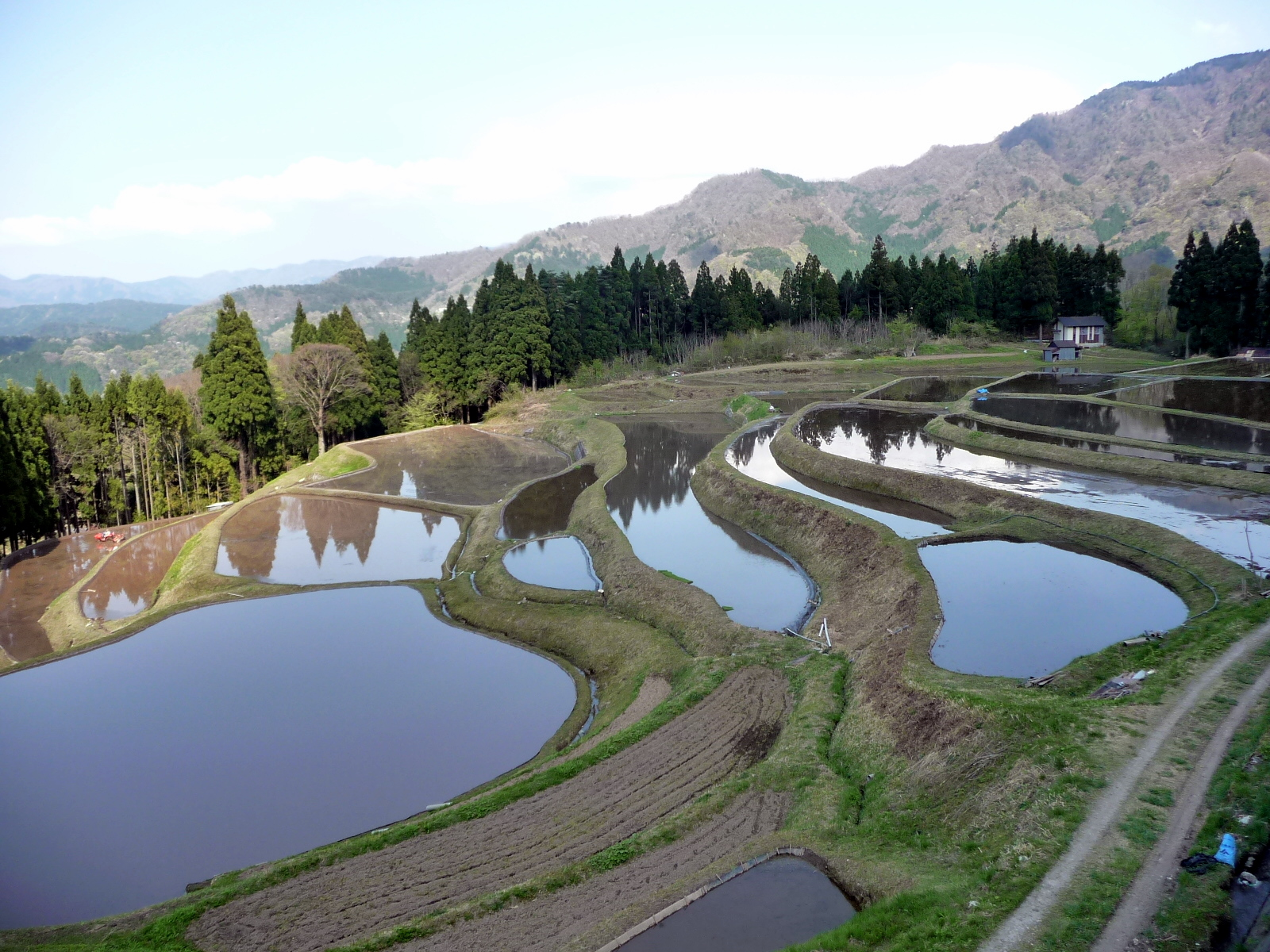
Rice terraces in Kami, Hyōgo Prefecture in Japan

In Japan, rural areas are referred to as "Inaka" which translates literally to "the countryside" or "one's native village".

==== Pakistan ====
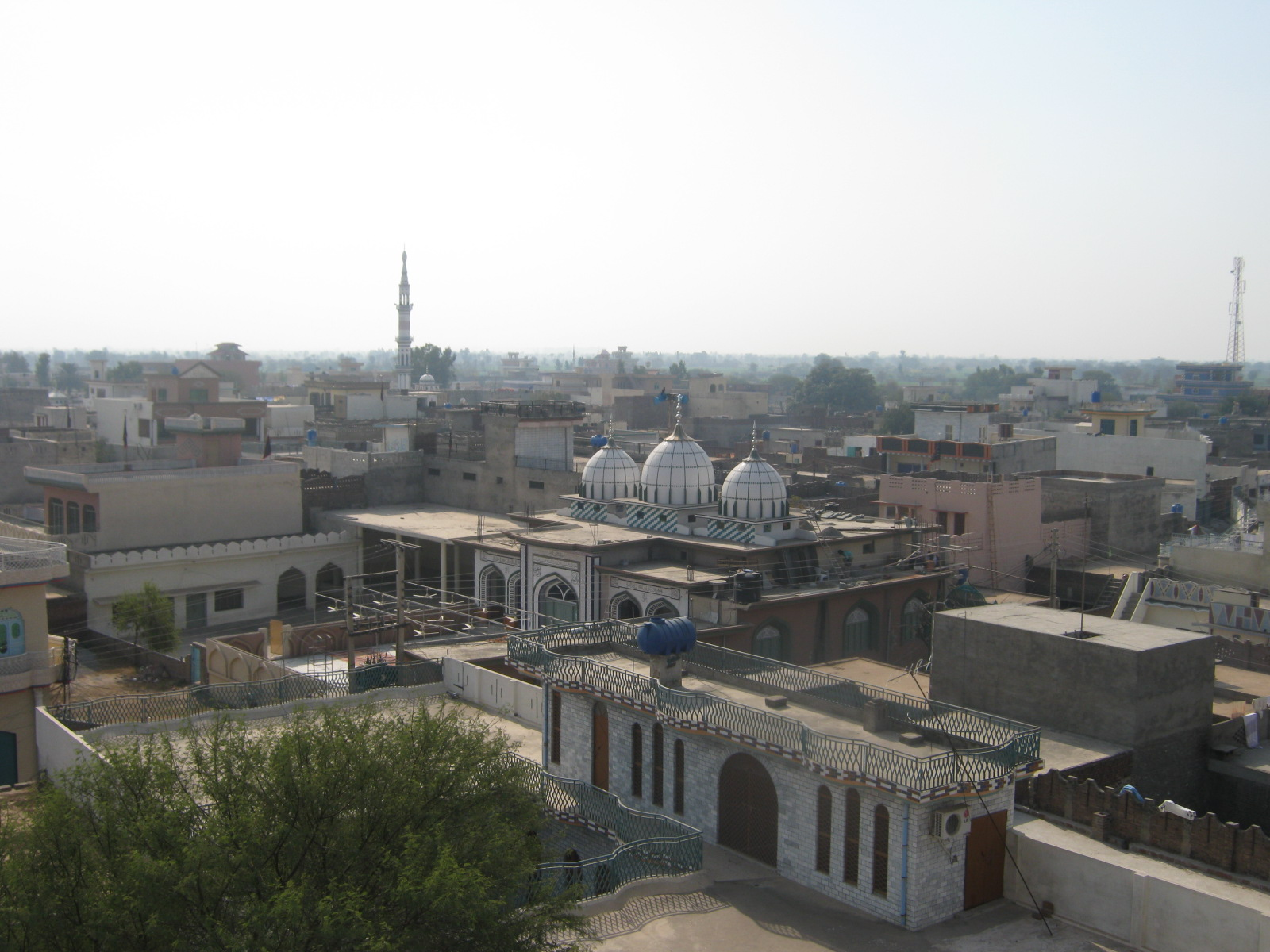
Amra Kalan village in Kharian, Pakistan

According to the 2017 census about 64% of Pakistanis live in rural areas. Most rural areas in Pakistan tend to be near cities and are peri-urban areas. This is due to the definition of a rural area in Pakistan being an area that does not come within an urban boundary. Rural areas in Pakistan that are near cities are considered as suburban areas or suburbs.

The remote rural villagers of Pakistan commonly live in houses made of bricks, clay or mud. Socioeconomic status among rural Pakistani villagers is often based upon the ownership of agricultural land, which also may provide social prestige in village cultures. The majority of rural Pakistani inhabitants livelihoods is based upon the rearing of livestock, which also comprises a significant part of Pakistan's gross domestic product. Some livestock raised by rural Pakistanis include cattle and goats.

=== Oceania ===
==== New Zealand ====
In New Zealand census areas are classified based on their degree of rurality. However, traffic law has a different interpretation and defines a rural area as "a road or a geographical area that is not an urban traffic area, to which the rural speed limit generally applies".

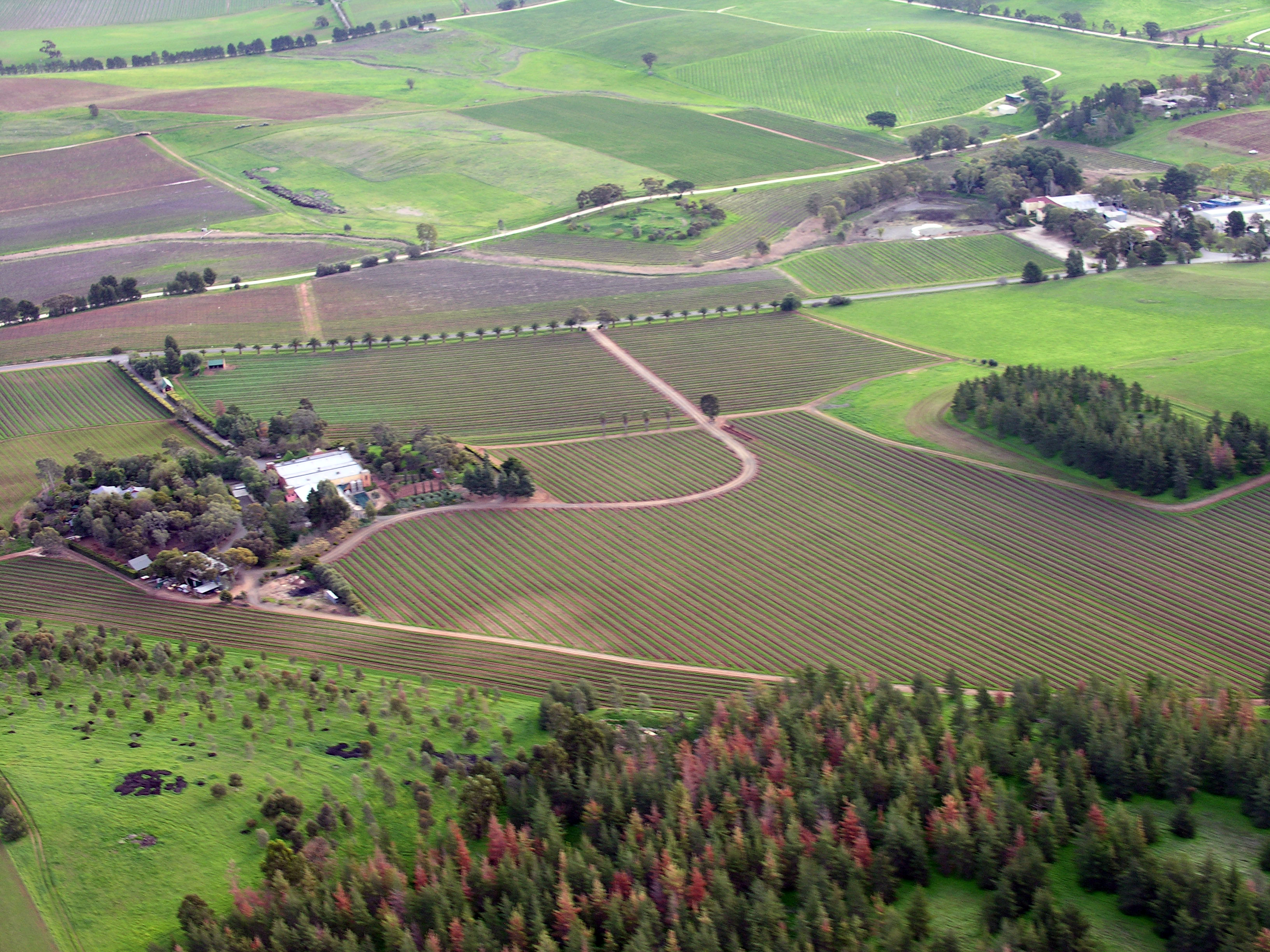
Barossa Valley in South Australia, noted for its vineyards

== Economics ==
Rural economics is the study of rural economies. Rural economies include both agricultural and non-agricultural industries, so rural economics has broader concerns than agricultural economics which focus more on food systems. Rural development and finance attempt to solve larger challenges within rural economics. These economic issues are often connected to the migration from rural areas due to lack of economic activities and rural poverty. Some interventions have been very successful in some parts of the world, with rural electrification and rural tourism providing anchors for transforming economies in some rural areas. These challenges often create rural-urban income disparities.

Rural spaces add new challenges for economic analysis that require an understanding of economic geography: for example understanding of size and spatial distribution of production and household units and interregional trade, land use, and how low population density effects government policies as to development, investment, regulation, and transportation.

Rural economics conceptualizes rural areas not as mere appendages of agriculture but as complex economic systems in which production, everyday life, community, ecosystems, services, and settlement patterns are integrated. It often uses a triangular framework of economy, society, and space as a core analytical lens that runs through the discipline. The economic dimension encompasses a multi‑layered industrial ecosystem that extends beyond agriculture to include rural manufacturing, tourism, renewable energy, bio‑industries, and the digital economy. The social dimension covers demographic change, household economies, labor markets, cooperatives, social farming, and care economies that sustain rural social reproduction. The spatial dimension focuses on land use, living and social infrastructure, settlement systems, financial systems, and digital infrastructure as the physical and institutional arenas in which rural economic activity unfolds, and on the disparities within these arenas. Rural economics aims to elucidate how these three dimensions constrain and reinforce one another through their dynamic interactions.

Rural economics takes as its disciplinary mandate the diagnosis of the structural crises confronting rural areas, the re-examination of the multifunctional value of the countryside, and the design of a sustainable rural economic model. Such tasks can be fully accomplished only by broadening the theoretical foundation through interdisciplinary convergence with adjacent fields—agricultural economics, regional economics, social economics, and spatial economics—and must ultimately culminate in the establishment of an independent body of theory that reflects historical experience and concrete conditions.

The Fundamental Problematic of Rural Economics: Why, and How, Does the Countryside Persist?

The fundamental problematic running through rural economics is not merely whether the countryside is in crisis, but rather a civilizational question: How has the countryside come to exist? What sustains it? And how will it endure and transform in the future? Rural areas continuously lose population, undergo industrial change, and experience the contraction of services; yet at the same time they have maintained a distinctive resilience grounded in relational economy, community capital, ecology, landscape, food, and culture. To clarify the mechanisms of this persistence is the core problematic of rural economics, and it calls for a meta-economic approach in which economy, society, space, and civilization are conjoined. Rural economics begins from the vision that it must be established not as a discipline of agriculture but as a civilizational economics that undergirds the future of the nation and of humanity. (Source: *Rural Economics*, Choi Mun-sik and Lee So-jin, 2026)

=== Development ===
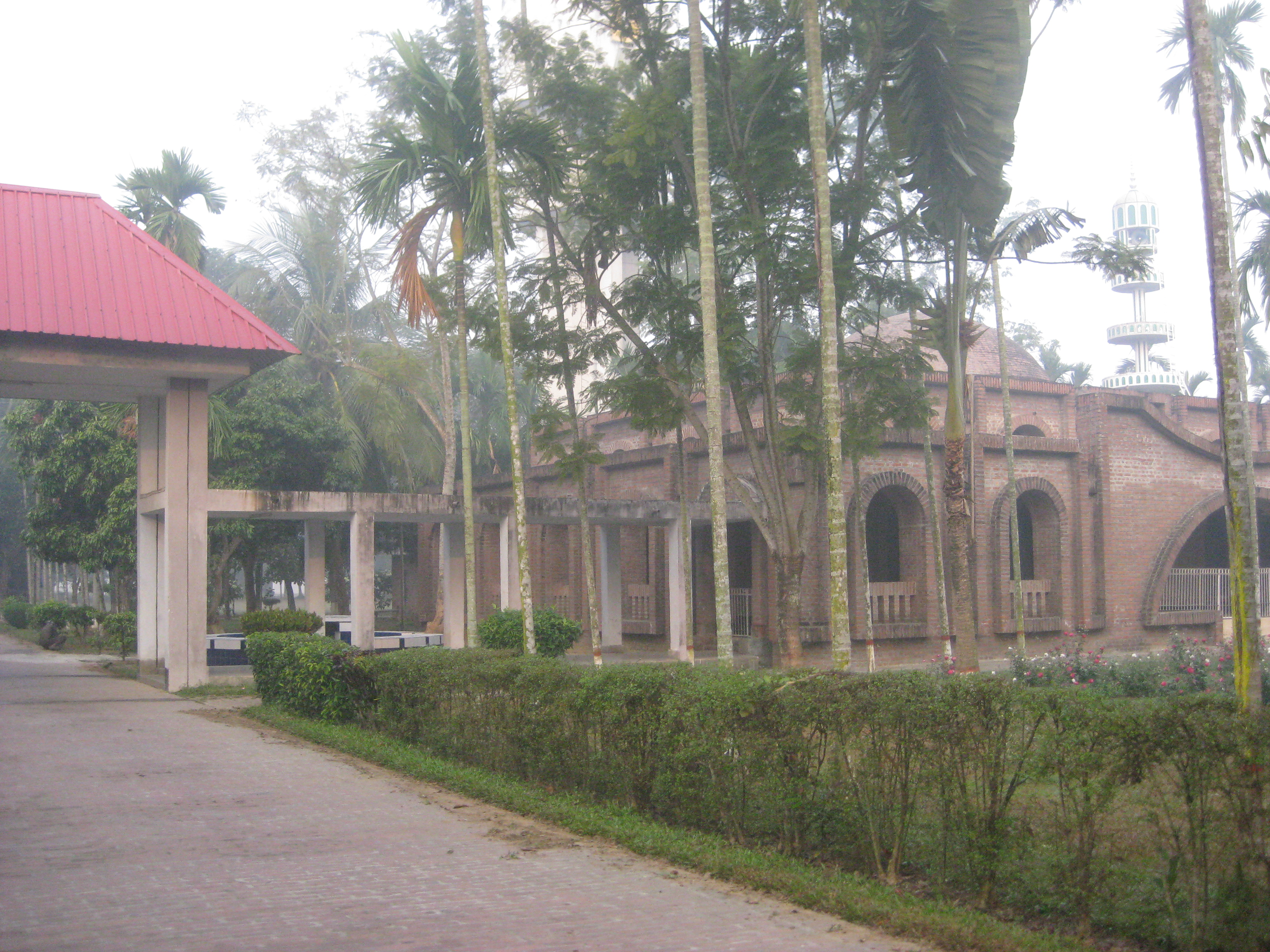
A rural development academy in Bogra, Bangladesh. Many government and non-governmental agencies invest in capacity building and opportunities for rural communities to gain greater access to economic opportunities.

Rural development is the process of improving the quality of life and economic well-being of people living in rural areas, often relatively isolated and sparsely populated areas. Often, rural regions have experienced rural poverty, poverty greater than urban or suburban economic regions due to lack of access to economic activities, and lack of investments in key infrastructure such as education.

Rural development has traditionally centered on the exploitation of land-intensive natural resources such as agriculture and forestry. However, changes in global production networks and increased urbanization have changed the character of rural areas. Increasingly rural tourism, niche manufacturers, and recreation have replaced resource extraction and agriculture as dominant economic drivers. The need for rural communities to approach development from a wider perspective has created more focus on a broad range of development goals rather than merely creating incentive for agricultural or resource-based businesses.

Education, entrepreneurship, physical infrastructure, and social infrastructure all play an important role in developing rural regions. Rural development is also characterized by its emphasis on locally produced economic development strategies. In contrast to urban regions, which have many similarities, rural areas are highly distinctive from one another. For this reason there are a large variety of rural development approaches used globally.

=== Electricity ===
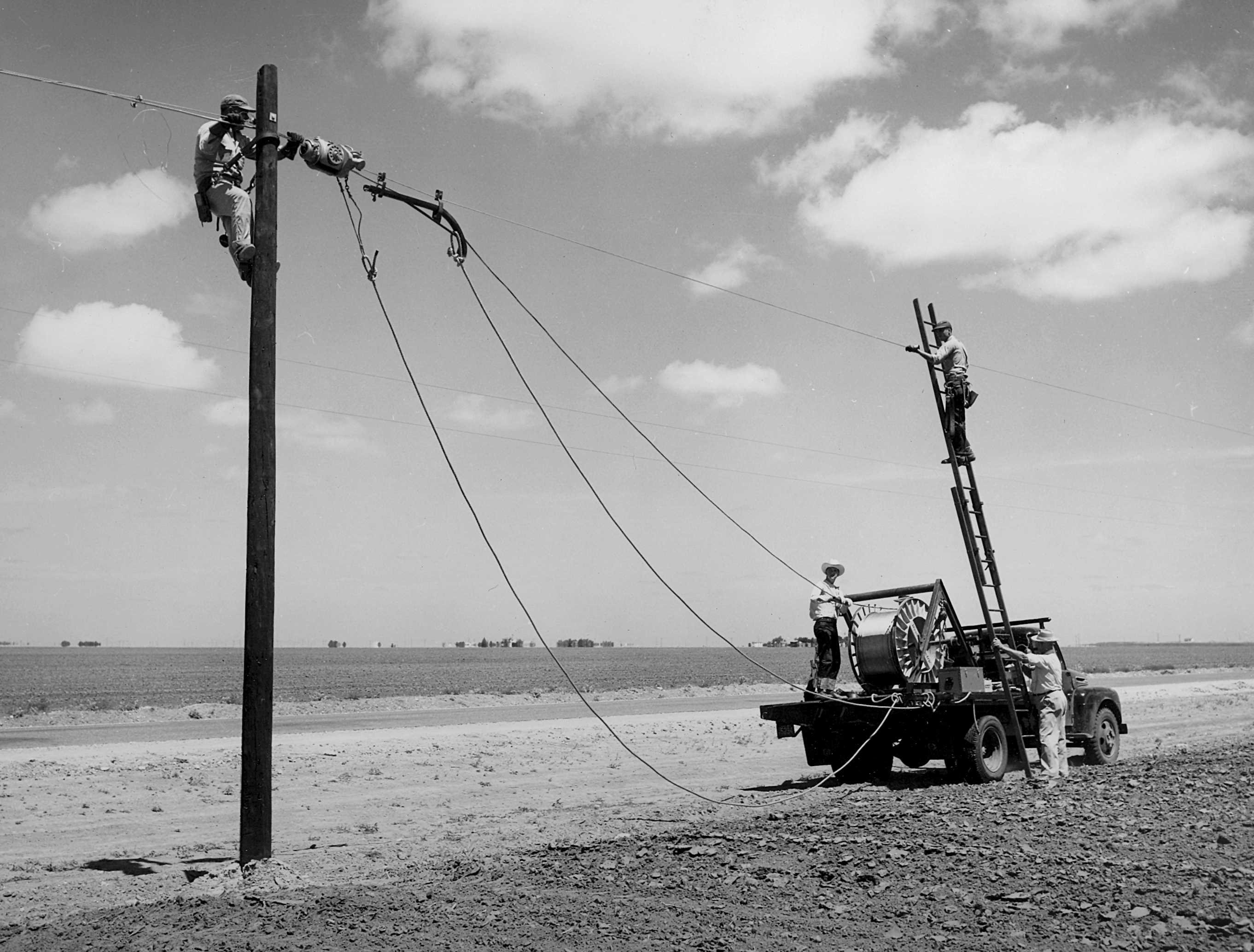
Construction of rural power distribution lines in the United States, funded by the Rural Electrification Administration

Share of the population with access to electricity

Rural electrification is the process of bringing electrical power to rural and remote areas. Rural communities are suffering from colossal market failures as the national grids fall short of their demand for electricity. As of 2019, 770 million people live without access to electricity – 10.2% of the global population. Electrification typically begins in cities and towns and gradually extends to rural areas, however, this process often runs into obstacles in developing nations. Expanding the national grid is expensive and countries consistently lack the capital to grow their current infrastructure. Additionally, amortizing capital costs to reduce the unit cost of each hook-up is harder to do in lightly populated areas (yielding higher per capita share of the expense). If countries are able to overcome these obstacles and reach nationwide electrification, rural communities will be able to reap considerable amounts of economic and social development.

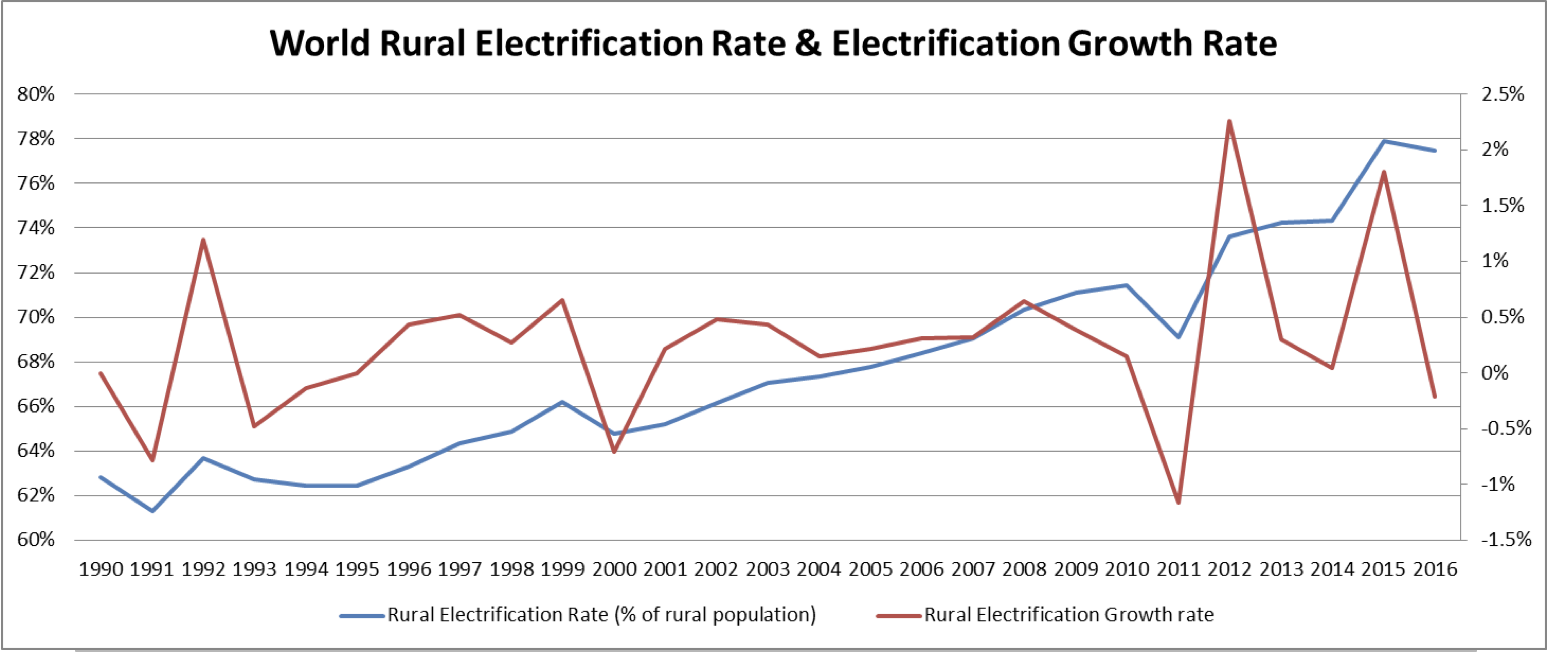
This graph shows the world rural electrification rate along with the electrification growth rate 1990–2016 and synthesizes data from the World Bank.

=== Migration ===
Urban vs rural majority

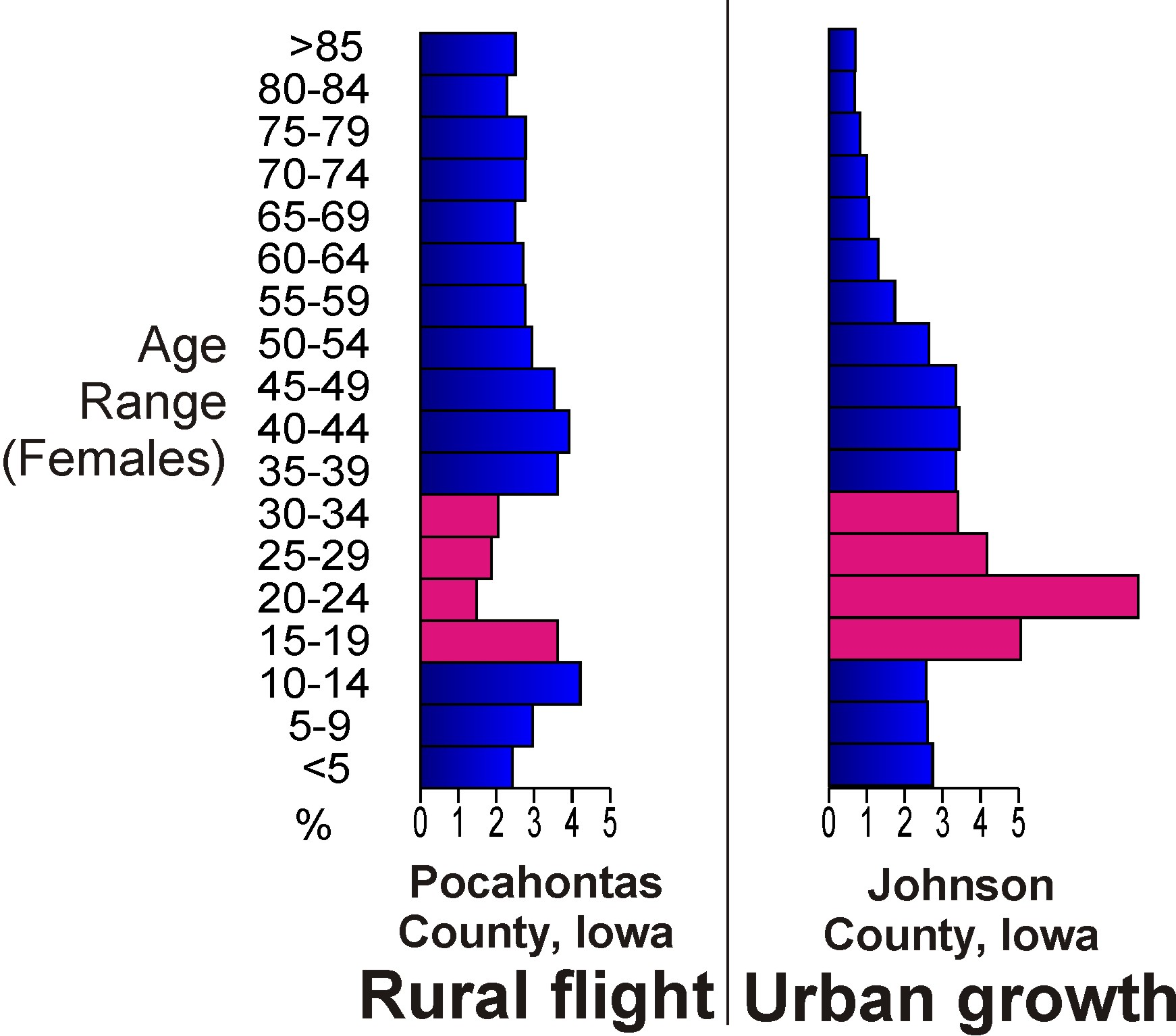
Population age comparison between rural Pocahontas County, Iowa, and urban Johnson County, Iowa, illustrating the flight of young female adults (red) to urban centers in Iowa

Rural flight (also known as rural-to-urban migration, rural depopulation, or rural exodus) is the migratory pattern of people from rural areas into urban areas. It is urbanization seen from the rural perspective. The pattern arises from an interplay of various push and pull factors and has occurred across history pushing states to employ multiple strategies to deal with the social and economic ramifications.

In industrializing economies like Britain in the eighteenth century or East Asia in the twentieth century, it can occur following the industrialization of primary industries such as agriculture, mining, fishing, and forestry—when fewer people are needed to bring the same amount of output to market—and related secondary industries (refining and processing) are consolidated. Rural exodus can also follow an ecological or human-caused catastrophe such as a famine or resource depletion. These are examples of push factors.

People can also move into town to seek higher wages, educational access and other urban amenities; examples of pull factors.

Once rural populations fall below a critical mass, the population is too small to support certain businesses, which then also leave or close, in a vicious circle. Services to smaller and more dispersed populations may be proportionately more expensive, which can lead to closures of offices and services, which further harm the rural economy. Schools are the archetypal example because they influence the decisions of parents of young children: a village or region without a school will typically lose families to larger towns that have one. But the concept (urban hierarchy) can be applied more generally to many services and is explained by central place theory.

Government policies to combat rural flight include campaigns to expand services to the countryside, such as electrification or distance education. Governments can also use restrictions like internal passports to make rural flight illegal. Economic conditions that can counter rural depopulation include commodities booms, the expansion of outdoor-focused tourism, and a shift to remote work, or exurbanization. To some extent, governments generally seek only to manage rural flight and channel it into certain cities, rather than stop it outright as this would imply taking on the expensive task of building airports, railways, hospitals, and universities in places with few users to support them, while neglecting growing urban and suburban areas.

In the 21st century states have adopted other strategies to counter this depopulation. They include Japan's akiya programs, Ireland’s refurbishment grants for island housing, and Greece’s relocation stipends in order to repopulate said regions. Others used migration (Canada’s Rural Community Immigration Pilot) which matched rural employers facing labor shortages with immigrants. Similarly, Romania also assists with housing and language learning.

=== Poverty ===
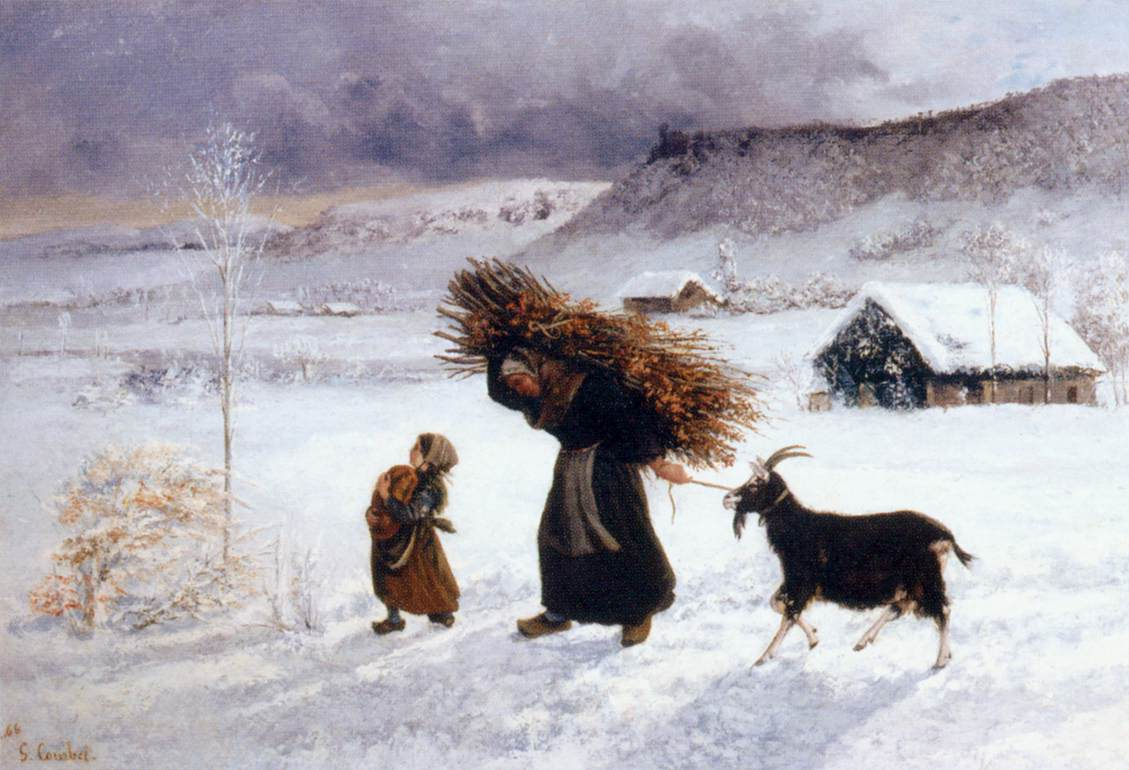
Gustave Courbet depicted nineteenth century rural poverty in this painting.

Rural poverty refers to situations where people living in non-urban regions are in a state or condition of lacking the financial resources and essentials for living. It takes account of factors of rural society, rural economy, and political systems that give rise to the marginalization and economic disadvantage found there. Rural areas, because of their small, spread-out populations, typically have less well maintained infrastructure and a harder time accessing markets, which tend to be concentrated in population centers.

Rural communities also face disadvantages in terms of legal and social protections, with women and marginalized communities frequently having a harder time accessing land, education and other support systems that help with economic development. Several policies have been tested in both developing and developed economies, including rural electrification and access to other technologies such as internet, gender parity, and improved access to credit and income.

In academic studies, rural poverty is often discussed in conjunction with spatial inequality, which in this context refers to the inequality between urban and rural areas. Both rural poverty and spatial inequality are global phenomena, but like poverty in general, there are higher rates of rural poverty in developing countries than in developed countries.

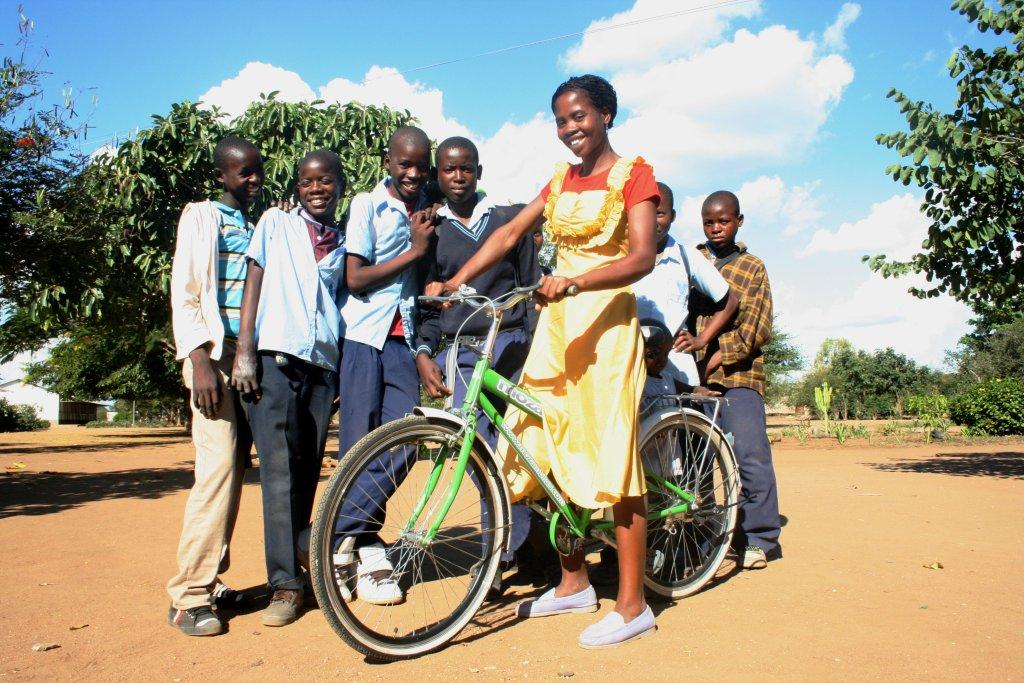
Many parts of rural Africa, such as this community in Mozambique, experience rural poverty. This woman was given access to a bicycle through a rural development program through a Bicycle poverty reduction program. Access to affordable transportation has been a key part of gaining access to greater economic mobility in many parts of the world. For example, distributing bicycles was one of the key strategies used by China to reduce rural poverty in the 20th century.

Eradicating rural poverty through effective policies and economic growth is a continuing difficulty for the international community, as it invests in rural development. According to the International Fund for Agricultural Development, 70 percent of the people in extreme poverty are in rural areas, most of whom are smallholders or agricultural workers whose livelihoods are heavily dependent on agriculture. These food systems are vulnerable to extreme weather, which is expected to affect agricultural systems the world over more as climate change increases.

Thus the climate crisis is expected to reduce the effectiveness of programs reducing rural poverty and cause displacement of rural communities to urban centers. Sustainable Development Goal 1: No Poverty sets international goals to address these issues, and is deeply connected with investments in a sustainable food system as part of Sustainable Development Goal 2: Zero Hunger.

== Rural health ==
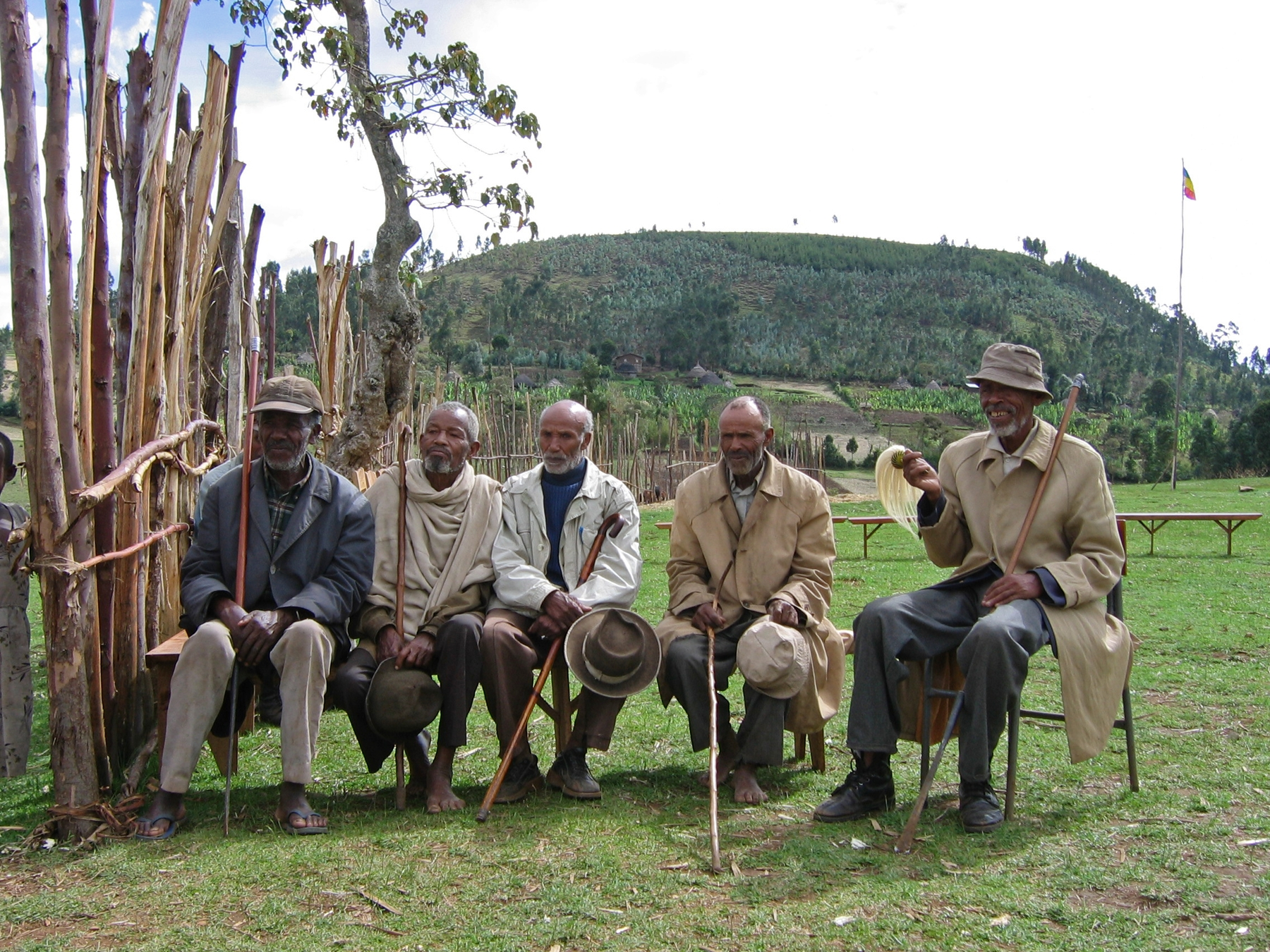
Village elders participate in a training for rural health care workers in Ethiopia.

In medicine, rural health or rural medicine is the interdisciplinary study of health and health care delivery in rural environments. The concept of rural health incorporates many fields, including wilderness medicine, geography, midwifery, nursing, sociology, economics, and telehealth or telemedicine.

Rural populations often experience health disparities and greater barriers in access to healthcare compared to urban populations. Globally, rural populations face increased burdens of noncommunicable diseases such as cardiovascular disease, cancer, diabetes, and chronic obstructive pulmonary disorder, contributing to worse health outcomes and higher mortality rates.

Factors contributing to these health disparities include remote geography, increased rates of health risk behaviors, lower population density, decreased health insurance coverage among the population, lack of health infrastructure, and work force demographics. People living in rural areas also tend to have less education, lower socioeconomic status, and higher rates of alcohol and smoking when compared to their urban counterparts. Additionally, the rate of poverty is higher in rural populations globally, contributing to health disparities due to an inability to access healthy foods, healthcare, and housing.

Many countries have made it a priority to increase funding for research on rural health. These research efforts are designed to help identify the healthcare needs of rural communities and provide policy solutions to ensure those needs are met.

== Academic study ==
Because of their unique dynamics, different academic fields have developed to study rural communities.

=== Economics ===
Rural economics is the study of rural economies. Rural economies include both agricultural and non-agricultural industries, so rural economics has broader concerns than agricultural economics which focus more on food systems. Rural development and finance attempt to solve larger challenges within rural economics. These economic issues are often connected to the migration from rural areas due to lack of economic activities and rural poverty. Some interventions have been very successful in some parts of the world, with rural electrification and rural tourism providing anchors for transforming economies in some rural areas. These challenges often create rural-urban income disparities.

Rural spaces add new challenges for economic analysis that require an understanding of economic geography: for example understanding of size and spatial distribution of production and household units and interregional trade, land use, and how low population density effects government policies as to development, investment, regulation, and transportation.

Rural economics conceptualizes rural areas not as mere appendages of agriculture but as complex economic systems in which production, everyday life, community, ecosystems, services, and settlement patterns are integrated. It often uses a triangular framework of economy, society, and space as a core analytical lens that runs through the discipline. The economic dimension encompasses a multi‑layered industrial ecosystem that extends beyond agriculture to include rural manufacturing, tourism, renewable energy, bio‑industries, and the digital economy. The social dimension covers demographic change, household economies, labor markets, cooperatives, social farming, and care economies that sustain rural social reproduction. The spatial dimension focuses on land use, living and social infrastructure, settlement systems, financial systems, and digital infrastructure as the physical and institutional arenas in which rural economic activity unfolds, and on the disparities within these arenas. Rural economics aims to elucidate how these three dimensions constrain and reinforce one another through their dynamic interactions.

Rural economics takes as its disciplinary mandate the diagnosis of the structural crises confronting rural areas, the re-examination of the multifunctional value of the countryside, and the design of a sustainable rural economic model. Such tasks can be fully accomplished only by broadening the theoretical foundation through interdisciplinary convergence with adjacent fields—agricultural economics, regional economics, social economics, and spatial economics—and must ultimately culminate in the establishment of an independent body of theory that reflects historical experience and concrete conditions.

The Fundamental Problematic of Rural Economics: Why, and How, Does the Countryside Persist?

The fundamental problematic running through rural economics is not merely whether the countryside is in crisis, but rather a civilizational question: How has the countryside come to exist? What sustains it? And how will it endure and transform in the future? Rural areas continuously lose population, undergo industrial change, and experience the contraction of services; yet at the same time they have maintained a distinctive resilience grounded in relational economy, community capital, ecology, landscape, food, and culture. To clarify the mechanisms of this persistence is the core problematic of rural economics, and it calls for a meta-economic approach in which economy, society, space, and civilization are conjoined. Rural economics begins from the vision that it must be established not as a discipline of agriculture but as a civilizational economics that undergirds the future of the nation and of humanity. (Source: *Rural Economics*, Choi Mun-sik and Lee So-jin, 2026)

=== Rural planning ===
Rural planning is an academic discipline that exists within or alongside the field of urban planning, regional planning or urbanism. The definition of these fields differs between languages and contexts. Sometimes the terms are used interchangeably.

Specific interventions and solutions will depend entirely on the needs of each region in each country, but generally speaking, regional planning at the macro level will seek to:

- Resist development in flood plains or along earthquake faults. These areas may be utilised as parks, or unimproved farmland.
- Designate transportation corridors using hubs and spokes and considering major new infrastructure
- Some thought into the various 'role's settlements in the region may play, for example some may be administrative, with others based upon manufacturing or transport.
- Consider designating essential nuisance land uses locations, including waste disposal.
- Designate Green belt land or similar to resist settlement amalgamation and protect the environment.
- Set regional level 'policy' and zoning which encourages a mix of housing values and communities.
- Consider building codes, zoning laws and policies that encourage the best use of the land.
- Allocation of land.

=== Sociology ===
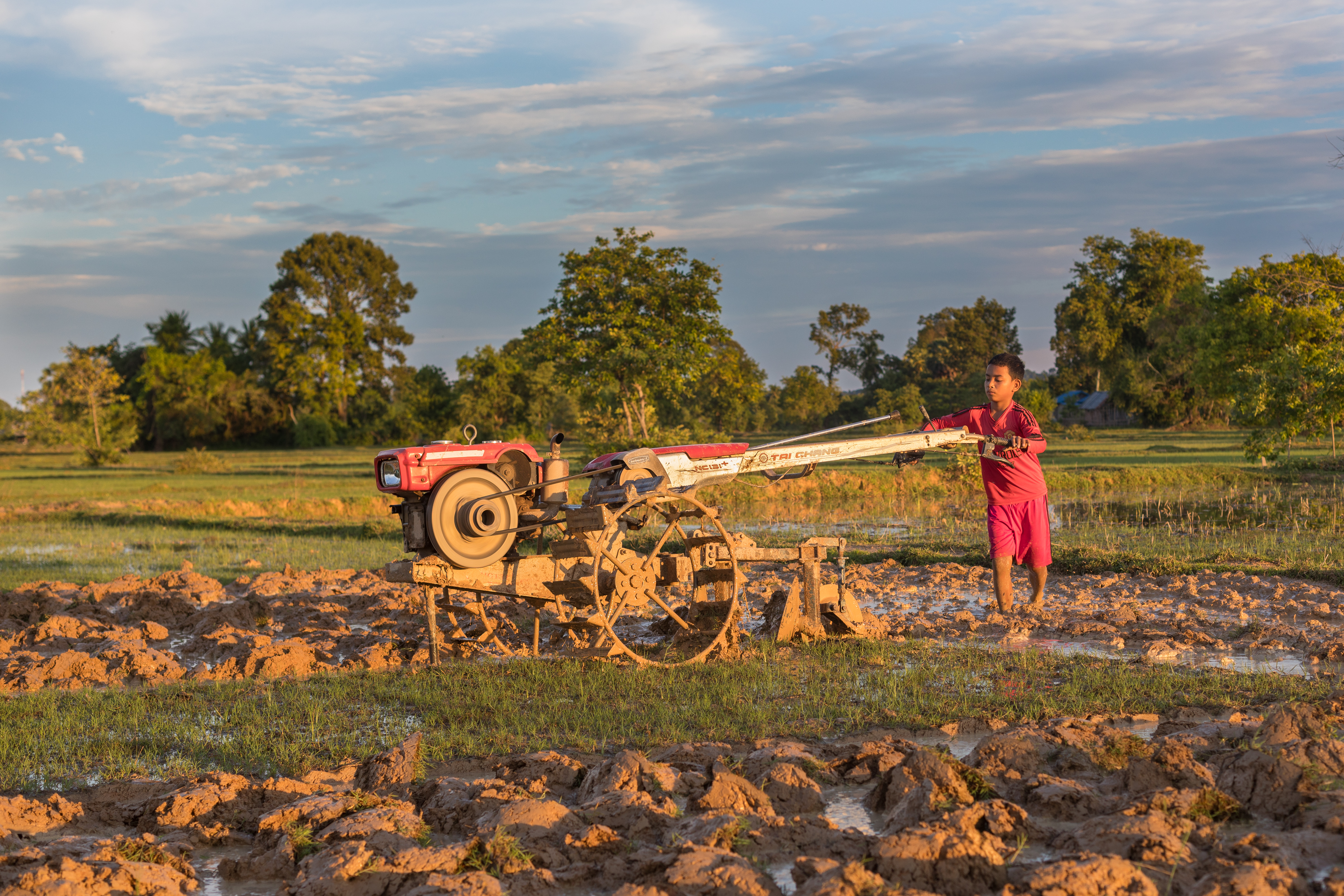
Boy plowing with a tractor at sunset in Don Det, Laos

Rural sociology is a field of sociology traditionally associated with the study of social structure in rural areas. It is an active academic field in much of the world. It emerged in the United States in the 1910s with close ties to the national Department of Agriculture and land-grant university colleges of agriculture.

While the issue of natural resource access transcends traditional rural spatial boundaries, the sociology of food and agriculture is one focus of rural sociology, and much of the field is dedicated to the economics of farm production. Other areas of study include rural migration and other demographic patterns, environmental sociology, amenity-led development, public-lands policies, so-called "boomtown" development, social disruption, the sociology of natural resources (including forests, mining, fishing and other areas), rural cultures and identities, rural health-care, and educational policies. Many rural sociologists work in the areas of development studies, community studies, community development, and environmental studies. Much of the research involves developing countries or the Third World.

== See also ==
- Arcadia (utopia)
- American Frontier
- Boondocks
- Bushland
- Country house
- Developed areas
- Digital divide
- Landed gentry
- Nature
- Outback
- Peasantry
- Rural community council
- Rural crafts
- Rural ghetto
- Rural Internet
- Urban decay
- Wilderness
