= Rural Sociological Society =

Organisation of social scientists

The Rural Sociological Society (RSS) is a professional social science association that promotes the generation, application, and dissemination of sociological knowledge. The RSS seeks to enhance the quality of rural life, communities, and the environment. It was officially established on December 29, 1937, in order to promote the development of rural sociology through teaching, research and extension. Membership in the RSS includes persons professionally employed in the field of rural sociology, or those interested in the objectives of the Society. The RSS holds meetings in different locations every year.

== Purpose ==
The activities of the Rural Sociological Society are a peer-reviewed journal, Rural Sociology, an annual conference, and support for scholars concerned with rural topics. The RSS aims to give leadership in scholarship, policies, and advocacy. Since its founding in 1937, the RSS has traced changes in rural life, demography, community structures and economies, technologies, environmental conditions, agriculture and food systems.

== History ==
Before the RSS, those interested in the discipline met as the Rural Sociology Section of the American Sociological Society, which later became the American Sociological Association. The meeting at which the formation of the RSS was approved had not started with that in mind. Rather, a committee of section members appointed previously presented a report that supported continued association with the parent organization, although one of the five members submitted a minority report calling for separation. After substantial discussion, a vote to establish a separate organization carried. That same day, a provisional constitution and by-laws were established by the founding RSS members; they still guide activities, although both have been amended through the years as membership and issues have changed.

The decision to form the Rural Sociological Society in 1937 was not totally unexpected. Discussion of sponsoring an organization of rural sociologists occurred in the 1920s and was widespread in the mid-1930s. Indeed, concerns with opportunities to bring topics related to rural issues before larger audiences led to the publication of the first volume of the quarterly journal, Rural Sociology, in 1936. This had come about only because of the support of members of the Rural Sociology Section, both in terms of financing and editing; issues in the first two volumes had "Published by the Rural Sociology Section [of the] American Sociological Society" on the covers. That changed in 1938, when Rural Sociology became the official journal of the RSS; it has been published continuously since.

== See also ==
- Paul L. Vogt
