= Rural sociology =

Branch of sociology

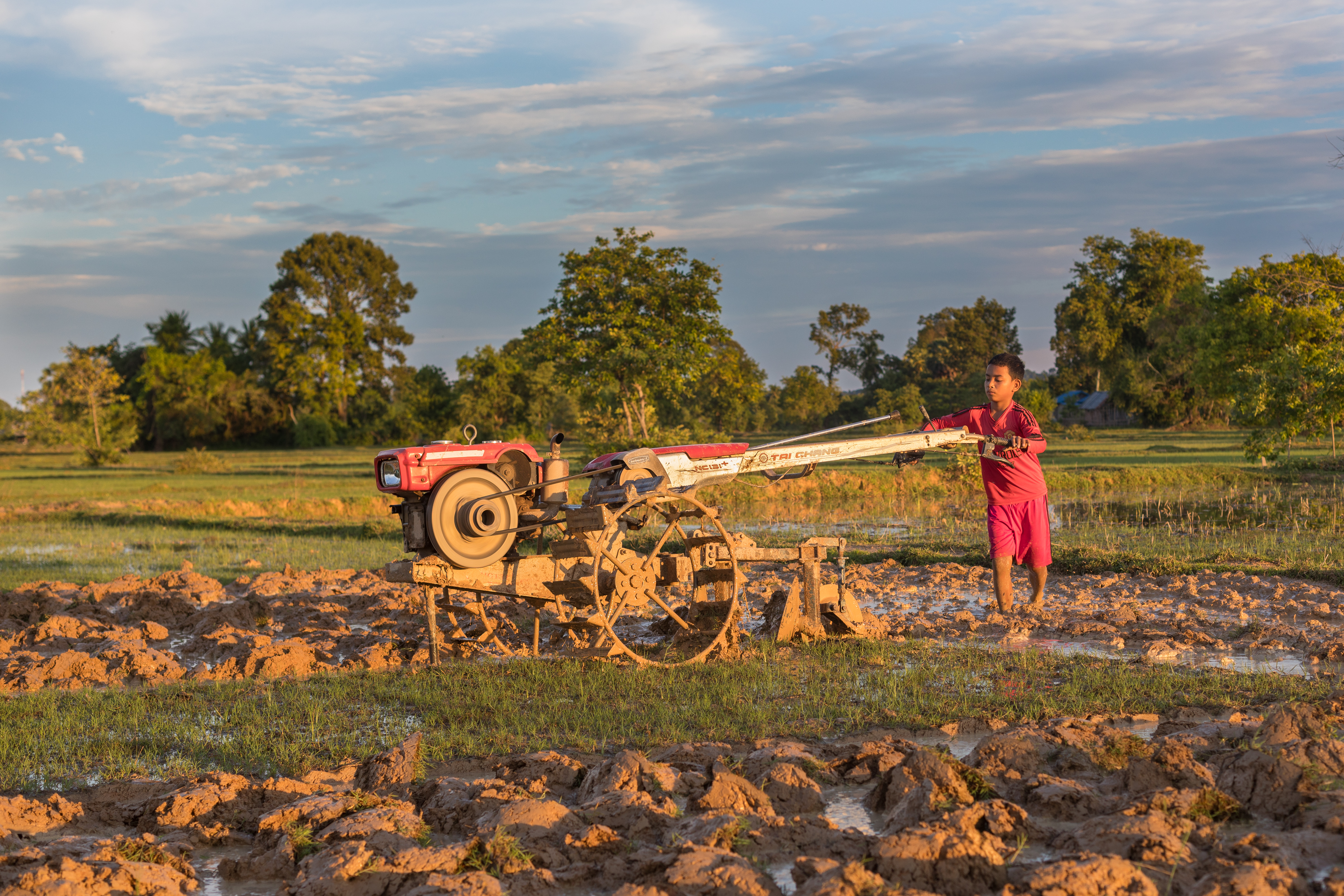
Boy plowing with a tractor at sunset in Don Det, Laos

Rural sociology is a field of sociology traditionally associated with the study of social structure in rural areas. It is an active academic field in much of the world. It emerged in the United States in the 1910s with close ties to the national Department of Agriculture and land-grant university colleges of agriculture.

While the issue of natural resource access transcends traditional rural spatial boundaries, the sociology of food and agriculture is one focus of rural sociology, and much of the field is dedicated to the economics of farm production. Other areas of study include rural migration and other demographic patterns, environmental sociology, amenity-led development, public-lands policies, so-called "boomtown" development, social disruption, the sociology of natural resources (including forests, mining, fishing and other areas), rural cultures and identities, rural health-care, and educational policies. Many rural sociologists work in the areas of development studies, community studies, community development, and environmental studies. Much of the research involves developing countries or the Third World.

== History ==
=== United States ===
==== Early beginnings and connection with regular sociology ====
Rural sociology has been described as a "truly American invention," as it is a field of study intertwined with specific U.S. historical events and policy interventions. U.S. Federal laws passed in the first part of the 20th century provided dedicated funding for agricultural-related research at U.S. Land-grant university and Agricultural Experiment Stations, including in the field of rural sociology. The field emerged with a distinctly applied, social-problems approach. Its primary aim was an applied one of "improving the life and well-being of rural people."

However, if rural sociology is defined as a "spatially oriented" sociology, as it is by many scholars, its intellectual lineage is closely connected to the foundational concerns of the broader discipline, since early European sociologists were preoccupied with the spatial and social transformations brought on by industrialization and urbanization. The intellectual frameworks they developed to understand the shift from traditional to modern life were later relied on by some early American rural sociologists.

One such framework was Ferdinand Tönnies' Gemeinschaft and Gesellschaft. Tonnies distinguished between Gemeinschaft (community), characterized by intimate, private, and enduring social ties based on kinship and neighborhood, and Gesellschaft (society), marked by impersonal, mechanical, and fleeting relationships typical of urban capitalism. This dichotomy provided a lens for analyzing what was seen as the "great change" occurring in American rural communities as they became more integrated into the national economy and culture. Émile Durkheim's analysis of the division of labor in "complex" societies offered another theoretical perspective for understanding the transformation of rural America, as did Georg Simmel's exploration of the psychological adaptations required by urban life, contrasting the rational, detached, and blase attitude of the city dweller with the emotion-based relationships of rural existence.

As American rural sociology developed, it reversed some of the normative assessments of these European thinkers. While theorists like Simmel were concerned with the problems of urbanity, American scholars, influenced by events like the Country Life Commission, began to focus on the deficiencies and "problems" of rural life that were seen as distinct from those of the city.

Some of the most rigorous and pioneering empirical work in early American sociology was conducted in rural areas by W.E.B. Du Bois. Long before the field was formally institutionalized, Du Bois undertook detailed, data-driven studies of rural Black communities. His 1898 study of Farmville, Virginia, for example, involved in-person surveys and statistical analysis of family structures, economics, education, and group life. Similarly, his research on the "Black Belt" regions systematically documented the socioeconomic conditions of rural African Americans, interpreting findings on land tenure, the tenant system, and social organization within the specific context of Southern rurality.

==== Land grant universities, agricultural experiment stations, colleges of agriculture ====
While European sociological thought provided a conceptual groundwork, American rural sociology's institutional base was forged through a series of landmark federal acts aimed at transforming American agriculture and rural life, starting with the Morrill Act of 1862. Signed by President Abraham Lincoln during the Civil War and enacted decades before what is largely regarded the "birth" of American rural sociology, the Morrill Act established the public university infrastructure for the study of "agriculture and the mechanical arts". The act granted federal land to each state to build public colleges, extending higher education beyond the elite private institutions of the time. This provided the institutional home where rural sociology would later take root.

However, the common narrative of the Morrill Act providing "free land" for education obscures a more complex and troubling history. As recent scholarship has detailed, the act initiated a massive wealth transfer by converting nearly 11 million acres of land expropriated from indigenous nations into seed money for these colleges. This land was acquired from almost 250 distinct tribes and communities through "over 160 violence-backed land cessions."

Following the Morrill Act, a series of other federal laws expanded the mission and resources of the land-grant system, further solidifying the institutional environment for rural sociology. In 1887, the Hatch Act of 1887 established Agricultural Experiment Stations in each state, creating a formal research infrastructure and opening federal funding pipelines for agricultural science. This emphasis on research provided a model and, eventually, resources for rural sociological inquiry. Later, influenced by the recommendation of the Country Life Commission, the Smith-Lever Act of 1914 institutionalized public outreach by creating the Cooperative Extension Service. This mandate to bring university research directly to the public cemented the applied focus of the land-grant mission. It provided a natural avenue for disseminating rural sociological findings.

The final step in institutionalizing American Rural Sociology was the Purnell Act of 1925. Considered a major turning point for the discipline, it formally recognized rural sociology as a distinct field of study and, for the first time, provided dedicated federal funds specifically for rural sociological research and teaching within the land-grant colleges. The Purnell Act led to a significant increase in both the quantity and quality of rural sociological studies, marking the transition of the field into a new, more professionalized era. It also established agricultural economics as a parallel field, leading to an academic division of labor where economists focused on the farm economy, and rural sociologists studied community, family, and social organization.

==== Commission on Country Life ====
===== Purpose =====
The "birth" of rural sociology as a formal area of inquiry in the United States is largely attributed to the work of the Commission on Country Life, appointed by President Theodore Roosevelt in 1908. This event emerged from a complex political and economic climate and fundamentally shaped the direction of the new discipline.

The late 19th century was a period of hardship for American farmers, who faced a contracting money supply and increasing economic domination by the railroad, finance, and industrial trusts. This distress fueled the Populist movement, which identified the farmers' problems as primarily economic and sought structural reforms to curb the power of monopolies. However, President Theodore Roosevelt viewed the challenges facing rural America as social and moral, not just economic. His goal was to "preserve the goodness of country life at a moral level while making agriculture efficient and constructing social institutions to prepare farmers for a modern life in which monopoly capitalism was a given."

This perspective drove the creation of the Country Life Commission. Roosevelt's charge was to investigate the "deficiencies" of country life and recommend measures to improve it, focusing on enhancing "human interests" and making rural living more dignified and satisfying.

===== Methods and findings =====
Liberty Hyde Bailey, the Dean of the New York State College of Agriculture at Cornell University, chaired the Country Life Commission. To assess rural conditions, they distributed over 500,000 questionnaires and received more than 115,000 responses from rural residents nationwide. The Commission also conducted 30 public hearings in 29 states, gathering direct testimony on the state of country life.

The final report, submitted in 1909, identified several key "deficiencies" in country life. While some technical concerns were addressed, such as the widespread practice of "exploitative" farming that depletes soil fertility, most of the problems identified were social. For example, rural schools were found to be in a "state of arrested development," failing to prepare children for farm life. At the same time, churches were often unable to serve as effective community leaders. Other problems included inadequate roads; the isolation, monotony, and excessive labor that characterized the lives of many women on farms; the need for better organization among farmers for both economic and social purposes; and poor sanitation and a lack of access to healthcare in the open country.

===== Recommendations and Impact =====
The Commission's report made several key recommendations that had a lasting impact on both federal policy and the development of rural sociology. Among these were a nationalized cooperative extension service to bring the knowledge of the agricultural colleges directly to farmers and surveys of rural conditions to create a detailed inventory of the nation's agricultural resources and social conditions.

These recommendations directly influenced the passage of the Smith-Lever Act of 1914, which created the Cooperative Extension Service, and the Purnell Act of 1925, which provided federal funding for rural sociological research. The report's call for local surveys also inspired thousands of "rural social surveys" conducted by church groups and nascent university departments. Much of the early dissertation research in the field, such as the community studies at Columbia University, followed the survey model advocated by the commission. In this sense, the commission's work truly laid the foundation for rural sociology as an applied, research-based discipline.

===== Critiques =====
Despite its influence, the Country Life Commission has been subject to criticism. First, the commission itself included no working farmers, tenants, or women, yet it offered extensive advice and analysis of the problems these very groups faced. It has also been argued that many farmers resented the "uplift" tone of the commission, arguing that their problems were economic, not moral. They felt the commission was condescending, focusing on supposed "social deficits" like inadequate schools and a lack of "ideals," rather than on the structural economic issues of prices, credit, and corporate power that the Populists had highlighted. One spokesman for the National Grange retorted that what farmers needed was not "betterment" but a "square deal." The commission's report is also notable for its failure to address the unique conditions of African American farmers in the South. This omission is particularly striking given that the commission's chairman, Liberty Hyde Bailey, had corresponded with W.E.B. Du Bois, who was already conducting pioneering studies of rural Black communities. Du Bois later expressed his disappointment to Bailey that the commission had overlooked the issue of race.

==== Key works and practitioners in early American sociology ====
The period following the 1908 Country Life Commission was marked by a rise in research activity and the emergence of early prominent figures in American rural sociology. Because a constant theme of the Commission was the need for a thorough study of rural conditions, its report inspired a wave of "rural social surveys" conducted by early rural sociologists.

Among the first research during this period were three doctoral dissertations from Columbia University, which were completed under the guidance of Professor Franklin H. Giddings, who encouraged empirical work. These intensive community studies were noted for their scientific sophistication for the era, when most sociological research was still theoretical. These included An American Town by James Michel Williams, Quaker Hill by Warren H. Wilson, and Hoosier Village by Newell Sims.

Additionally, due to the Commission's governmental and non-governmental recommendations, early rural sociologists often played roles across multiple professional spheres, holding positions at land-grant universities, in the federal government, and in the ASA. One example of an early rural sociologist with multiple roles is Charles Galpin. In 1915, Galpin published The Social Anatomy of an Agricultural Community, which introduced methods for defining and mapping the boundaries of a "rurban" community by tracing the trade and social areas of town centers. This technique became a standard in the field. In his analysis, Galpin also translated the abstract European concepts that provide a foundation for rural sociology like Tönnies' Gemeinschaft and Gesellschaft into a practical, American context, though this hasn't been discussed much. In 1919, he was appointed to head the USDA's new Division of Farm Population and Rural Life. From this position, he stimulated research nationwide by providing small but important grants to scholars at various colleges.

Carl C. Taylor is another rural sociologist whose career illustrates the interconnectedness of the institutional homes of early rural sociology. After Galpin, he served as head of the USDA's Division of Farm Population and Rural Life and was elected president of both the RSS in 1939 and the ASA in 1946. Taylor was also a committed advocate for social justice, focusing on the plight of farm laborers and other marginalized groups. His activism had personal consequences; after challenging segregationist policies, his position at North Carolina State was eliminated by the university's board of trustees.

==== Re-organization ====
By the mid-1930s, rural sociology had grown into a large and distinct field of study. This culminated in 1937, when the Rural Section of the American Sociological Association (ASA) voted to form its own separate professional organization, the Rural Sociological Society (RSS).

Although rural sociology has been challenged for being less theoretical than the parent discipline it split from, rural sociology had carved out its own intellectual framework long before. While it borrowed core concepts from early American sociology, the subfield was defined by its highly applied nature. Its primary purpose was not simply to study rural life, but to actively solve what was widely termed the "farm problem."

This problem-solving orientation was heavily shaped by the legacy of the Country Life Commission and the field's main funding sources, the USDA and Protestant churches. This framework tended to define the "farm problem" as stemming from deficiencies in individual personalities and local social institutions such as schools and churches. The focus was on correcting these perceived social deficits through education and community uplift, which created an applied paradigm that increasingly set rural sociology apart from the more theoretical concerns of general sociology.

Still, the discipline did not remain static after its formation. By the 1970s, rural sociology faced what some called a crisis. Due to demographic changes, the "rural-urban continuum" model that many rural sociologists relied on had lost its explanatory power, and critics like Jim Hightower argued that the land-grant complex, including rural sociology, had become too closely aligned with corporate agribusiness and had neglected the family farmers and rural communities it was created to serve. In response, a "new rural sociology" emerged, which recentered the discipline on a critical sociology of agriculture. This new approach moved away from a focus on community deficits and instead began to analyze the structural transformations in agriculture, the political economy of the food system, and the social consequences of agricultural change, much like the Populists encouraged during the years of the Country Life Commission.

This pattern of adaptation and reorganization continues today. As the structure of agriculture and rural life has evolved, so too have the university departments that house rural sociology. In many foundational land-grant universities, the freestanding "Department of Rural Sociology" has been renamed or merged to reflect new intellectual currents and institutional priorities. These changes often signal a broadening of scope from a sole focus on U.S. agriculture to encompass community and environmental issues, international development, and a more integrated approach across the social sciences.

Examples of this ongoing restructuring include:

- University of Wisconsin–Madison: The Department of Rural Sociology was renamed the Department of Community & Environmental Sociology.
- Cornell University: The department was first renamed Development Sociology and later reorganized into the broader Department of Global Development.
- University of Kentucky: Rural Sociology was combined with other programs to form the Department of Community & Leadership Development.
- University of Illinois Urbana–Champaign: Rural sociology faculty were merged into a new Department of Human and Community Development.
- The Ohio State University: Rural Sociology faculty were merged into the School of Environment and Natural Resources, where the field is now often framed as Environmental & Natural Resources Sociology.
- University of Missouri: The department was reorganized, and rural sociology faculty now sit within the Division of Applied Social Sciences.

=== Europe ===
==== History of European Rural Sociology ====
Though Europe included more agricultural land than the United States at the turn of the twentieth century, European rural sociology did not develop as an academic field until after World War II. This is partially explained by the highly philosophical nature of pre-war European sociology: the field's focus on broad-scale generalizations largely erased rural-urban differences. European sociology in the early 1900s was also almost entirely siloed within European academia, with little cross-Atlantic pollination. Practical applications and research methods employed by Land Grant Colleges, the Country Life Commission, and early American rural sociologists like W.B. Du Bois were also well beyond the strictly academic sphere in which European sociologists resided. The concerns of rural people, farmers, and agriculture were simply outside the attention of most European sociologists at that time.

Post-war, European academic institutions began to understand that "there was something useful in the activities of those queer people who called themselves rural sociologists." Stronger relationships between American and European sociologists developed in the late 1940s, which was reflected in the Marshall Plan of 1948. The Plan formalized the United States as a source of information and economic guidance for postwar Europe and allocated the equivalent of 100B in 2023 dollars to help Europe rebuild, especially its food systems and machinery needed to expand agricultural production. With this aid came an infusion of empirical rural research designed to promote rural growth and agricultural success.

The United States' influence was reflected in pedagogical changes that incorporated rural sociological methods pioneered by American rural sociologists, particularly statistical methods. Education met increased government demand for sociological expertise, driven by European reconstruction and a growing recognition of the importance of sociological insight to policymaking.

While the mid-20th century saw rural sociological research in most European nations driven by government need, rural sociology as an academic discipline was rare in general universities. This was due in part to the lack of university agricultural programs, but also a general resistance to applied sciences. Where rural sociology classes did exist, an emerging divergence from the American model presented itself in European's treatment of culture as an independent variable in rural sociological research. E.W. Hofstree, by all accounts the grandfather of European rural sociology, observed why cultural difference was of particular importance in Europe:

"In Europe, not only between the different nations but also between an infinite number of regional and even local groups within every country, there are differences in culture, which influence the behaviour of those groups considerably.... it will take a long time before Europe will show the same basic culture everywhere, and I must say that, from a personal point of view, I hope that it will take a very long time."

This departure from America's more homogenous treatment of rural culture grounded the field in methods that require community-level planning before technical change or community development can occur. These differences somewhat receded in the 1950s and 60s, when European rural sociology shifted away from sociocultural study and towards the facilitation of modern agricultural practices. This shift was driven by government interest in policy change as well as the perception that "backward [European] farmers [are] backward not only socially and culturally, but also economically and technically."

After relatively united beginnings, European rural sociology faced internal disagreements about pedagogy, focus, and direction in the 1970s. Many felt the field had strayed too far from its sociocultural roots, become too empirical, and overly aligned with government. Critics were particularly concerned by the field's seeming disregard for consideration of social interaction and culture, and encouraged a return to earlier modes of rural sociology that centered on community structure. Ultimately, the field regained its balance between empiricism and sociocultural and institutional study in the 1980s. Considerations of European rural sociologists have since expanded to include food systems, rural-urban interface, urban poverty, and sustainable development.

Outside formal academic programs, rural sociology organizations and journals were founded in the 1950s, including Sociologia Ruralis—which still publishes today— and the European Society for Rural Sociology (ESRS). Founded in 1957 by E.W. Hofstee, the ESRS welcomes international membership, including professional rural sociologists and those interested in their work, and holds regular congresses that promote cross-boundary collaboration and the growth of rural sociology research. Its liberal internationalism and inclusivity make it a unique interdisciplinary organization that stands somewhat apart from academia and splits its focus between theory and applied research. For example, in 2023, the ESRS's congress included working groups on diverse topics, including rural migration, population change, placemaking, mental health, and the role of arts and culture in sustaining rural spaces.

==== Rural spaces in Europe ====
The relevance of Rural Sociology to the European continent is undeniable. 44% of the EU's total land area is considered "rural," with the Union's newest member states having even higher percentages (up to 50%). More than half of the population in several member states, including Slovenia, Romania, and Ireland, lives in rural areas.

While the definition of rurality in Europe has traditionally included all "non-urban" spaces academia's definition of the term is in flux as more residents move to liminal spaces (sub-urban, peri-urban, ex-urban). Unlike the United States, European populations in urban areas are shrinking, with a noted uptick in migration back to rural and intermediary spaces over the last two decades, and especially since the end of COVID-19 lockdowns. These increasingly populated rural spaces are being met with greater economic development and tourism in the last two decades. As of 2020, 44% of Europe's population was categorized as "intermediate", and only 12% reside in urban space.

Despite these changes, focus on rural issues has been largely siloed within rural sociology programs. Between 2010 and 2019, the Council for European Studies hosted only one panel on Rural issues (Farm, Form, Family: Agriculture in Europe). There are signs this may be changing. Europe Now, a widely distributed mainstream academic journal, recently devoted an entire article to the intersection of European and rural studies, including pieces that challenge the continued applicability of the urban-rural dichotomy, as well as land access, food, resource-use disparities, and culture. This move towards interdisciplinarity reflects the human and topographical geography of Europe writ large, and foreshadows possible integration of rural sociology into mainstream academic discourse.

=== Australia and New Zealand ===
Rural sociology in Australia and New Zealand had a much slower start than its American and European counterparts. This is due to the lack of land-grant universities in the United States, which had invested heavily in the discipline, and to a lack of interest in studying the "peasant problem," as was the case in Europe. The earliest cases of studying rural life in Australia were conducted by anthropologists and social psychologists in the 1950s, with sociologists taking on the subject beginning in the 1990s.

Attempts were made between 1935 and 1957 to bring an American-style rural sociology to New Zealand. The New Zealand Department of Agriculture, funded by the Carnegie Foundation, tasked Otago University's economist W.T. Doig with surveying living standards in rural New Zealand in 1935. The creation and funding of such a report mirrors America's Commission on Country Life. Additional Carnegie funds were granted to the Shelly Group, which conducted the country's first major sociological community study and endorsed the creation of land grant institutions in New Zealand. Ultimately, these attempts to institutionalize rural sociology in New Zealand failed due to the department's lack of organization and failure to publish impactful survey results.

Early studies of rural sociology in the region focused on the influence of transnational agribusiness, the effects of technological changes on rural communities, the restructuring of rural environments, and social causes of environmental degradation. By the mid-2000s researchers focus had shifted towards broader sociological questions and variables such as the construction and framing of gender among Australian and New Zealand farmers, governmental policies impacts on rural spaces and studies, and rural safety and crime. Scholars have additionally focused on rural residents, particularly farmers, opinions of environmentalism and environmental policies in recent years. Such a focus is particularly salient in New Zealand where livestock farming has historically been a major national source of income and environmental policies have become increasingly strict in recent years.

Though early scholars of rural sociology in Australasia tout it for its critical lens, publications in the 2010s and 2020s have accused the discipline of omitting the experiences of indigenous peoples, failing to account for class-based differences, discounting the importance of race and ethnicity, and only recently incorporating in studies of women in rural places. Work on rural women in the region has often incorporated white feminism and used a colonial lens. As a response, scholars, particularly in New Zealand (Aotearoa), have begun to focus on the experiences of the Māori in rural areas, while likewise shifting from solving issues of farmers to rural residents. A few scholars in Australia have likewise begun to incorporate the experiences of Aboriginal peoples into their scholarship, including some who are indigenous scholars themselves. In particular, Chelsea Joanne Ruth Watego, and Aileen Moreton-Robinson have risen to prominence in recent years, though the latter two identify more as indigenous feminist scholars than rural sociology scholars.

Today, many prominent scholars do not belong to a department of rural sociology, but rather to related disciplines such as geography in the case of Ruth Liepins, and Indigenous Studies in the case of Sandy O'Sullivan, or Arts, Education, and Law in the case of Barbara Pini. Today, courses in the discipline can be studied at a small number of institutions: University of Western Sydney (Hawkesbury), Central Queensland University, Charles Sturt University, and the Department of Agriculture at the University of Queensland. Additionally, academics who publish in the discipline, such as Ann Pomeroy, Barbara Pini, Laura Rodriguez Castro, and Ruth Liepins, can be found at the University of Otago, Griffith University, and Deakin University.

=== Latin America ===
The beginnings of rural sociology's development in Latin America began in 1934 under the research of Commission of Cuban Affairs of the Foreign Policy Association member Carle C. Zimmerman. As a North American rural sociologist, he conducted a study in Cuba comparing the wealth and conditions of cane workers to that of colonizers. The results of this work ultimately led to a demand for rural life studies to expand to Bolivia, Brazil, Argentina, and Mexico, largely to provide materials to improve the quality of the United States' performance in World War II.

In the midst of the war, other rural sociologists were exploring the rural life of other countries. Dr. Olen Leonard assisted in establishing Tingo Maria's Agricultural extension program, the study of which was published in 1943. While in Ecuador, Leonard attempted to establish a similar program in the Hacienda Pichalinqui region by identifying how locals gathered, the value and meaning of possessions, and the attitudes of those in the area. His work in Guatemala consisted of assisting public officials in developing a long-term plan for agricultural education; in Nicaragua, he participated in the development of a general and agricultural population census. Glen Taggert (El Salvador), Dr. Carl Taylor (Argentina), and T. Lynn Smith (Colombia, El Salvador) also contributed to the advancement of Agricultural Extension programs in Latin America. Taylor's work, in particular, inspired the Argentinian Institute of Agriculture to establish the Institute of Rural Life.

The Caracas Regional Seminar on Education in Latin America of 1948 established fundamental education as a system that would be "specifically attending to native groups in such a way as to promote their all-around development in accordance with their best cultural traditions, economic needs, and social idiosyncrasies". This establishment catapulted a pilot project that would be explicitly tailored to the education of adults in rural communities. By the Fourth Inter-American Agricultural Conference in 1950, Montevideo, the United Nations departments of the Food and Agriculture Organization and the International Labour Organization were given responsibility for becoming more involved in activities that would benefit rural welfare. As a combined force, they were also tasked with requesting studies of social, economic, and spiritual conditions as they pertain to the well-being of rural communities.

There are five ways in which Latin American rural communities are differentiated from North American rural communities in 1958:

1. Village Community: Rural communities in Latin America are much more likely to be established around village communities. This type of community showed the highest prevalence in Mexico, Guatemala, Ecuador, Peru, and Bolivia. This is due to these countries having stronger Aboriginal elements, where the villagers own the land.
2. Church and State: At this point, Latin American countries were reported as having a government with stronger ties to religion, ideals, and decision-making processes falling in line exactly with the church parish. In this same vein, municipalities are drawn almost exclusively to account for the region's social and economic factors in an attempt to create a more natural social environment.
3. Social Organization: The rural experience of Latin America is much more closely knit. Rather than being familiar with or having affiliations throughout the entire area in an "everyone knows everyone" manner, the social organization here reflects a more contained approach to relationships. Social circles extend only to those with whom they have daily interactions, hardly straying beyond them. This approach means that if these few relationships do not produce a particular set of goods, the group must go without them.
4. Trade and Commerce: Keeping in line with the established relationship between church and state, the portions of a rural area that would be considered the trade center in North America are referred to as "ceremonial" or "church" centers. Bartering was the dominant economic practice in Latin American countries.
5. Stable Environment: Latin American rural communities did not face much in the way of threats against the sustainability of their lifestyles. Hardly any boundaries—administrative, legal, judicial, fiscal, or otherwise—obstructed the ability to maintain natural rural areas and the lives of the residents settled in them.

Mobilized peasants of the 1960s and 1970s attracted scholars to perform more in-depth studies on Latin American rural life. Conflict struck between the Marxist lean of social science and neoclassical domination of economics. Rural class structure, agrarian reform, and capitalist modes of production were all topics of discussion as the peasantry navigated their revolutionary status. The turn of the 21st century introduced the concept of "new rurality". The shaping of Latin America's rural economy had finally become entrenched in the newfound neoliberalism and globalization of the 1980s and 90s. Researchers claim that this has been expressed through the embrace of non-farm activities, the feminization of rural work, the growth of rural-urban relations, and migration and remittances. Some argue that no change has occurred because social ills (e.g., poverty, social injustice) persist.

=== Asia ===
Early studies of rural sociology in Asia appear to have first emerged and been written about in the mid-19th and early 20th centuries, though records of ancient thought on agriculturalists and peasants in rural spaces appear much earlier. India was a focus of many sociological studies in rural areas, with Henry S. Maine writing Ancient Law (1861), which studied some elements of Indian rural society. Similar texts from around that time were written by those with connections to the East India Company. Holt Mackenzie and Charles Metcalf both wrote about village communities and village life in India, and the East India Company published general reports on Indian territories, like, for example, the Punjab territories from the mid-19th and early 20th century.

India, however, was not the only focus of early sociological literature on rural life in Asia. A Systematic Source Book in Rural Sociology by Pitirim A. Sorokin was published in 1930 and focused on European, Asiatic, and American literature and thought on rural sociology . Sorokin outlines 'Ancient Oriental Sources' from Assyro-Babylonia, China, Egypt, India, Japan, Palestine, and Persia. He argues that caste is important for understanding agriculture in ancient India, and that the government and its structure can be used to explain the importance of agriculture and rural life in China. Sorokin makes these conclusions by drawing on records from these countries, which indicate study and thought about the sociology of early agriculturalists and those in rural areas. The excerpts and records used "give the ancient evaluation of agriculture as being a means of group subsistence as compared with other occupations; they reflect the society's view as to the relative rank of the cultivators in the social order; they depict ancient opinions concerning agriculture as an economic basis for the moral and social well-being of a society, as well as sever similar points. In addition, they depict in detail various laws concerning agriculture, much of the technique of ancient agriculture, the forms of ownership and possession of land, and, finally, the numerous rites and ceremonies connected with agriculture".

It was not until later, often in the mid to late 20th century, that rural sociology as a systematic branch of academia and study appeared in Asia (for example, see Ralph B. Brown's work).

==== India ====
In India, the rise of rural sociology was, in part, due to the country's independence in 1947. The government needed rural sociology to aid in its understanding of "the problems of extreme poverty of the people, overpopulation and general under-development of the economy". Studies focused on the changing nature of the role of towns, rural-urban actions since independence, rural change and what might be driving it, demographic research, rural development, and rural economies. In 1953, A. R. Desai published the first edition of Rural Sociology in India. The foreword of the book underlines the importance of understanding each aspect of society so that the Indian government could create "a uniform line of action for building a better social milieu". Due to the popularity of Desai's work and the expansion of the study of rural sociology in India, second and third editions of Rural Sociology in India were published in 1959 and 1961 to represent better new study foci and methodologies in this emerging field. Other popular researchers during the mid-20th century include S. C. Dube, M. N. Srinivas, and D. N. Majumdar. In India, rural sociological research and policies continued to be connected into the 21st century.

==== China ====
Before 1949, China's rural sociological studies focused primarily on the rural class and power structures. Community studies by prominent sociologists like Fei Xiatong (Fei Hsiao-tung) were influenced by American rural sociology and were also popular in mid and early 20th century China. All sociology programs in China were terminated in 1952 by Mao Zedong. It was not until 1979, when the Chinese Sociological Association was reestablished, that sociological studies in China began again. Influences from American sociologists were welcomed during this time and continued to impact Chinese rural sociological studies into the 21st century. However, there have been pushes from contemporary Chinese rural sociologists like Yang Min and Xu Yong to reconsider this Western lens.

==== Japan ====
Though rural sociology is thought to have originated earlier in Japan than in the United States, it was not until the end of the 1930s that Japanese sociologists were introduced to the methods and viewpoints of American rural sociologists. This introduction was primarily made by Eitarō Suzuki, who is considered one of the pioneers of Japanese rural and urban sociology. Other prominent Japanese rural sociological researchers of this time include Kitano Seiichi, Kizaemon Ariga, and Yozo Yamamoto. The rapid decrease in farming populations in Japan in 1955 shifted the focus of rural sociological studies in the mid 20th century to second jobs among farmers, farming cooperative associations, and the impact of community development policies on villages. Hiroyuki Torigoe of Kwansai Gakuin University was the leader of the Asian Rural Sociology working group, which was established in 1992 and later led to the development of the Asian Rural Sociological Society.

== Subfields ==
=== Sociology of Agriculture ===
The sociology of agriculture examines how changes in agricultural technology and industry drive development in rural areas. Historically, rural economies have often relied on agriculture as the primary industry. Karl Marx, Max Weber, and Émile Durkheim initially studied the agrarian societies and viewed changes in agriculture as an expansion of capitalism. The sociology of agriculture emerged from the discipline of rural sociology in the study of "diffusion of innovations" especially at land-grant universities. Some agricultural sociologists have studied why farmers may not always use the best management practices in the adoption of new technologies, and what may motivate them to adopt or avoid adopting conservation practices. It has found a purpose in studying agrarian changes and the agricultural transition, in which small farms steadily declined as agribusiness consolidated.

The sociology of agriculture examines topics in state transformation, social movements, gendered divisions of labor, GMOs, environmental conservation, land use preservation, food safety, persistence of small family farms, farmer inequality, life course and family, spatial inequality, civic society, farm families and communities, agricultural economics, global commodity chains, local food systems, and the household in relation to the farm economy.

Agricultural sociology is useful to understand regional characteristics and the decline of rural communities in agricultural regions. The emergence of global food systems has led to more competition among domestic farmers, and the concentration of production and consolidation of agribusiness exacerbates this competition. The field has expanded to more theoretical views of agricultural sociology and has been applied to the role of women in agriculture and part-time farmers. These new applications can help explain the struggles farmers face and how these struggles affect rural societies.

=== Natural Resource Sociology ===
The sociology of natural resources is distinguished from the sociology of agriculture by its focus on extraction. It hails from the studies of Marx, Durkheim, and Weber who saw the conversion of raw materials into goods as a foundation for capitalist society. The study of natural resources in modern sociology focuses on parks and leisure, public lands management and policy, land use planning, and interactions between society and the environment. Historic natural resource sociological research also studied resource management, resource extraction, the exigencies of space, the innovation and impacts of technologies, raw material processing and manufacturing goods, labor divisions, and social impact assessments.

Natural resource sociology studies communities whose economies are largely or solely based on extraction industries, such as logging, fishing, or mining. These communities experience vulnerabilities if and when the local industry exhausts its resources. These communities are vulnerable to extraction industries if they have characteristics of geographic isolation, lack of power compared to the extractive industries, and lack of viable alternatives for different economic developments. Much research in natural resource sociology is linked to a sociological lens of rural poverty, as extractive industries ultimately lead to a decline in regional economic activity and employment.

Natural resource sociology theorizes Allan Schnaiberg’s "treadmill of production," which views the system of capitalism as if running on a treadmill chasing perpetual growth and accumulation. Limited materials create problems for communities where economies are based on extraction. The sociology of natural resources examines the increased efficiency of resources, which led to people being able to live further away from these natural resources and move to urban areas for jobs.

In modern times, natural resource sociology has useful applications in the global supply chain and in the study of extractive industries worldwide.

=== Rural Poverty and Inequality ===
Sociological studies of rural poverty analyzes economic opportunities, limited access to resources including education, healthcare, jobs, childcare, and elder care, persistent poverty including a lack of intergenerational mobility, the phenomenon of the working poor, variances across demographics, and biases for research in urban poverty Urban and rural poverty have similar issues and outcomes – lack of jobs, low wages, increased hardships for single parents, women, and minorities – but the causes are different. In the United States, Appalachian poverty stems from the regional resource extraction economy, and poverty in the Deep South persists from the effects of slavery and sharecropping.

The sociological study of rural poverty has largely been focused in the United States, but has fallen in the shadow of the study of urban poverty. Rural poverty was hardly studied until the 1960s. President Lyndon B. Johnson created a report titled "The People Left Behind" in 1967. This report was the first meaningful federal attempt to study nonfarm rural poverty; it found the rural poverty rate at 25%, almost double the rate of urban poverty at the time. Rural poverty is consistently concentrated in certain areas of the country: Appalachia, Native American lands, Southern "Black Belt", the Mississippi Delta, and the Rio Grande Valley.

The Rural Policy Research Institute and the Institute for Research on Poverty wrote a follow-up report to "The People Left Behind" in 2018 and recommended policies that would invest in people (education, healthcare, safety net programs), create a favorable economic environment (full employment and higher minimum wage), investment in places (rural houses, rural development, and conservation projects), and redesigning institutions (updating farm and natural resource policies to benefit poor residents)

The USDA conducted a study in 2016 that found that nearly a quarter of children in rural areas experience poverty, compared to slightly more than 20% in urban areas. The USDA study demonstrates problems with research in rural poverty – rural poverty is often tied to agriculture even though rural areas and agricultural areas are no longer as synonymous as they used to be. In fact, food stamps were first suggested in 1939 by Secretary of Agriculture, Henry Wallace, as a farm subsidy intended for rural communities.

Bourdieu's idea of social capital can explain how rural poverty is not simply a measure of income but also how rural areas are marginalized through everyday cultural practices, resulting in greater stigmatization of rural people.

=== Rural Demography ===
Rural demography concerns the definition of rural areas distinct from urban areas, a common topic in rural sociology. Rural sociologists studying demography discuss out-migration and its relationship to "brain drain," or human capital flight. Rural aging populations are another area of concern. These concepts are contextualized with local economies, the presence of manufacturing, impacts of globalization, and neoliberal policies.

The economic impacts of globalization and neoliberalism have changed rural populations and demographics. The outsourcing of manufacturing from the U.S. to overseas led to job losses. Both local and global institutions affect economies in rural areas. Rural areas have been experiencing population loss or slower population growth in the 21st century, due to reduced migration. Population growth is spurred by the migration of Hispanics and other minorities, who make up 21% of the rural population, but comprise 83% of overall rural population growth between 2000 and 2010. Demographics of rural areas can be studied to understand the economic state of the area.

=== Community Development or Rural Development ===
The sociology of community development or rural development studies topics in employment, policies at all levels, resource distribution, spatial inequality, rural out-migration, immigration, corporate consolidation, poverty, access to postsecondary schooling, "brain drain," declining life-expectancy, and economic hardship.

Community development in rural areas is linked to demographic and poverty dynamics. Community development may be slowed by the out-migration of individuals seeking higher education, a phenomenon referred to as "brain drain." Rural economies are affected by shifts in employment, local policies, and space that may separate rural areas from resources. Rural schools are also subject to these influences, especially rural out-migration, poverty, and lack of access to post-secondary education.

Seventy percent of small towns and rural areas have lost population since the 1990s. Immigration has led to growth in some rural areas, accounting for 37% of rural growth between 2000 and 2018. In the western United States, immigration has reversed population decline in two-fifths of counties. Increased immigration and resulting population growth improve rural economies, with more taxpayers contributing to public services. Immigrants find jobs in manufacturing, food processing, agriculture, and healthcare, filling gaps left by a declining population and out-migration.

=== Rural Health ===
The sociology of rural health can be contextualized with rural poverty and rural demography. Key themes in rural health studies include affordability, social determinants of health, disability, mental health, poverty, and education. In the book, "Rural Populations and Health: Determinants, Disparities, and Solutions” by Richard A. Crosby et al., key determinants of rural health are geography, occupation, infrastructure, demographics, digital divide, access to health care, social capital, and political voice.

Rural areas have more children and elderly residents, as well as more unemployment and underemployment. The average income per capita is $7,000 lower in rural areas compared to urban areas, so rural residents often delay seeking healthcare due to cost. Rural areas have decreased life expectancy.

Jobs in rural areas in agriculture, logging, mining, and fishing can be hazardous – occupational injuries are more common in rural areas than in urban communities. Larger distances to travel for healthcare can limit access. Limited access to healthcare correlates with higher rates of chronic disease. Healthcare labor shortages, lack of affordability, and geographic and cultural factors affect the ability to access healthcare. The sociology of rural health lies in the intersection of people, politics, environment, history, and economic opportunity.

== Mission statements ==
The mission statements of university departments of rural sociology have expanded to include more topics, such as sustainable development. For example, at the University of Missouri, the mission is:

"The Department of Rural Sociology at the University of Missouri employs the theoretical and methodological tools of rural sociology to address challenges of the 21st century – preserving our natural resources, providing safe and nutritious food for an expanding population, adapting to climate changes, and maintaining sustainable rural livelihoods."

The University of Wisconsin set up one of the first departments of rural sociology. It has now dropped the term "rural" and changed its name to the "Department of Community and Environmental Sociology." Similarly, the Rural Sociology Program at the University of Kentucky has evolved into the. "Department of Community and Leadership Development," while transferring the graduate program in rural sociology to the Sociology Department. Cornell University's department of rural sociology has also changed its name to the department of Development Sociology.

== Associations ==
Scholarly associations in rural sociology include:

- The Rural Sociological Society (RSS), of the United States, was formed in 1937 after years of discussion as a spinoff of the American Sociological Society. It publishes the scholarly quarterly journal Rural Sociology. The full run of back issues is online from 1936 to 1989 through Cornell University Library's program of putting online core historical resources in rural sociology.
- The European Society for Rural Sociology (ESRS) was founded in 1957. It says it is "the leading European association for scientists involved in the study of agriculture and fisheries, food production and consumption, rural development and change, rurality and cultural heritage, equality and inequality in rural society, and nature and environmental care."
- The International Rural Sociology Association (IRSA) has as its mission, to "foster the development of rural sociology; further the application of sociological inquiry to the improvement of the quality of rural life; and provide a mechanism whereby rural sociologists can generate dialogue and useful exchange." It published the International Journal of Sociology of Agriculture and Food.
- The International Association for Society and Natural Resources (IASNR) publishes the journal, Society & Natural Resources.
- Asociación Latinoamericana de Sociologia Rural (ALASRU) as an organization founded in 1969, much of the rural sociology findings that come out of Latin America today are the work of the Asociación Latinoamericana de Sociologia Rural (Latin American Rural Sociological Association). With a combined effort of inter- and non-governmental organizations, the ALASRU aims to "promote rural development in the region; foster the dissemination and advancement of rural sociology; support the creation of national centres to carry out research in the field."
- The Asian Rural Sociology Association (ASRA) was established in 1996. Their mission is to "cultivate the development of the science of rural sociology, to extend the possible application of results of scientific inquiry to the improvement of the quality of rural life, and to exchange and generate meaningful scientific findings for the rural development in Asia. As a non-profit organization, ARSA strives for scientific and educational purposes only". ASRA hosted their first council meeting in Seoul, Korea in 1997 from March 7 through the 9th. It was at this council meeting that the ARSA ratified the constitution and made the decision to hold the First International Conference of ARSA in Thailand in January 1999. The overarching theme of this first conference was "Globalization and Rural Social Change"; 200 participants from 11 countries attended, and 33 papers were presented and subsequently published in the society's first volume of the Journal of Asian Rural Sociology. The society has hosted six total conferences, with the last one in 2018 focusing on food systems. The journal has continued to publish twice a year in January and July.

== Journals ==
Several academic journals are published in the field of (or closely related to) rural sociology, including:

- Agriculture and Human Values
- Journal of Agrarian Change
- Journal of Asian Rural Studies
- Journal of Peasant Studies
- Journal of Rural Studies
- Rural Sociology
- Society & Natural Resources
- Sociologia Ruralis

== See also ==
- American Country Life Association
- Back-to-the-land movement
- Commission on Country Life of 1908
- Food studies
- Highland Clearances, in Scotland
- Rural development
- Rural ghetto
- Rural history
- Smith–Hughes Act of 1917
- Vander Wilt Farmstead Historic District
