= Don Det =

Island in Champasak, Laos

Don Det ດອນເດດ
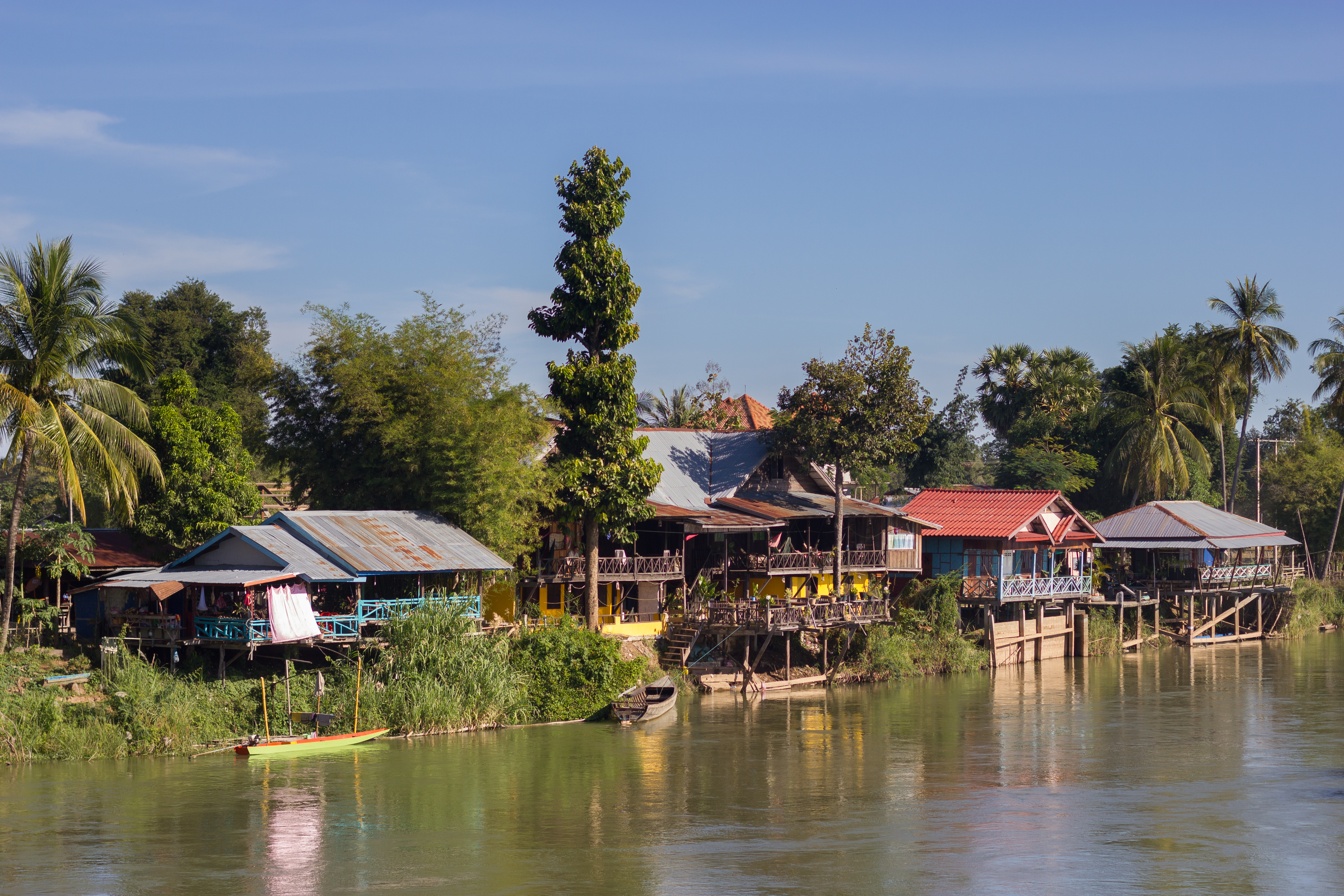
- Dwellings, Don Det

- Location in Laos
- Coordinates: 13°58′23″N 105°55′22″E
- Country: Laos
- Province: Champasak

Population
  - Religions: Buddhism
- Time zone: UTC+7 (ICT)

Don Det (Lao: ດອນເດດ) is an island in the Mekong River in the Si Phan Don ("Four Thousand Islands") archipelago in Champasak Province of southern Laos.

== History ==
The Don Det–Don Khon railway was a 7-kilometer (4.3 mi)-long narrow-gauge portage railway on the islands of Don Det and Don Khon, opened in 1893 to transport vessels, freight, and passengers along the Mekong River, and closed since the 1940s.

== Geography ==
The walking path around the island is 7.2 km (4.47 mi). Don Det is linked to its twin island Don Khon by a bridge. Don Som, the closest island accessible by pirogue, is 250 m (820 ft) from Don Det.

There is a Buddhist temple and two primary schools on the northern part of the island.

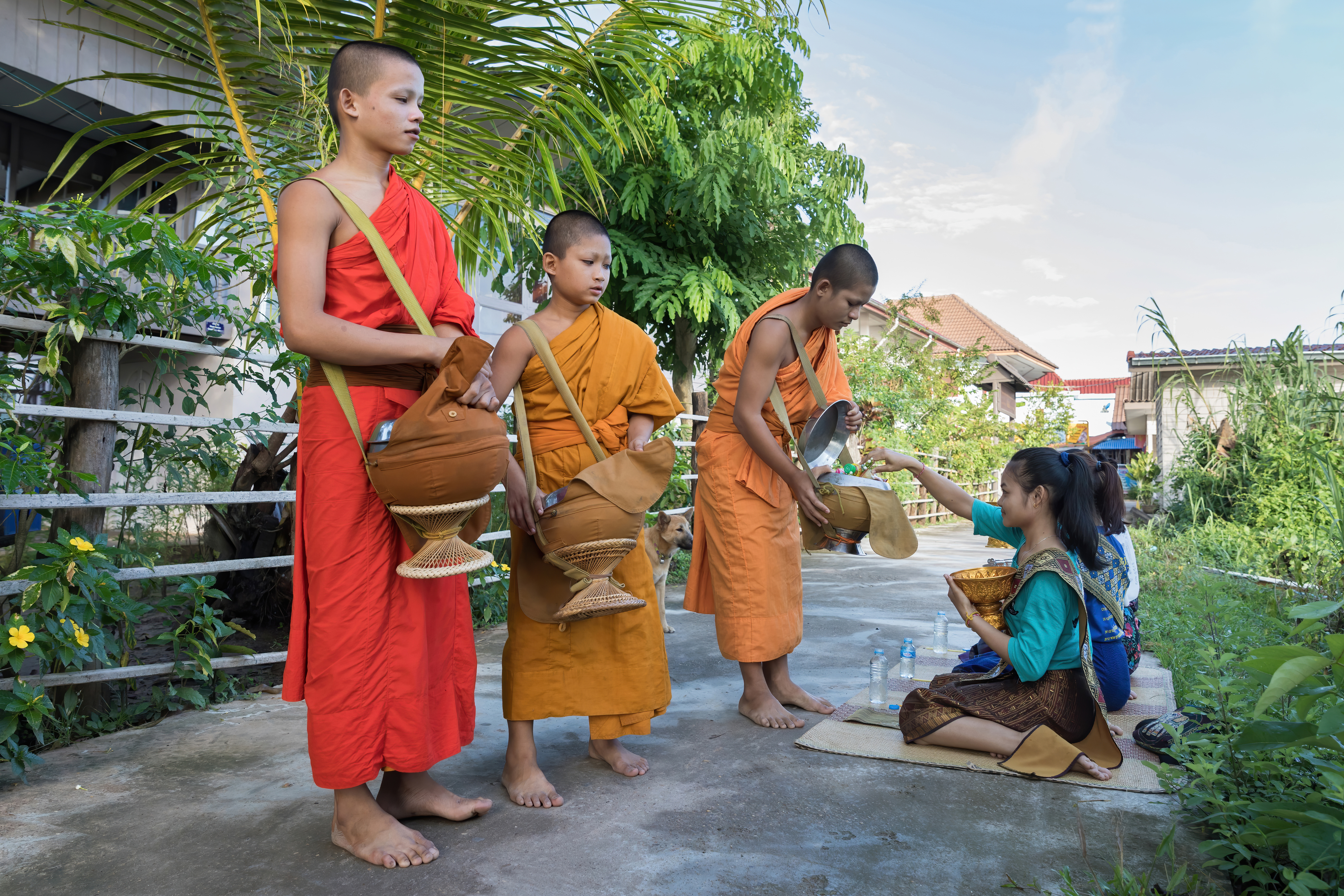
Buddhist alms in Don Det. Every day, early morning three child monks from the temple walk in the village with their alms bowls to collect food, prepared and offered by the locals, and to recite a short prayer in exchange. Ritually, Buddhist monks in Laos have only two meals a day: one in the morning and one at noon. They fast in the evening.

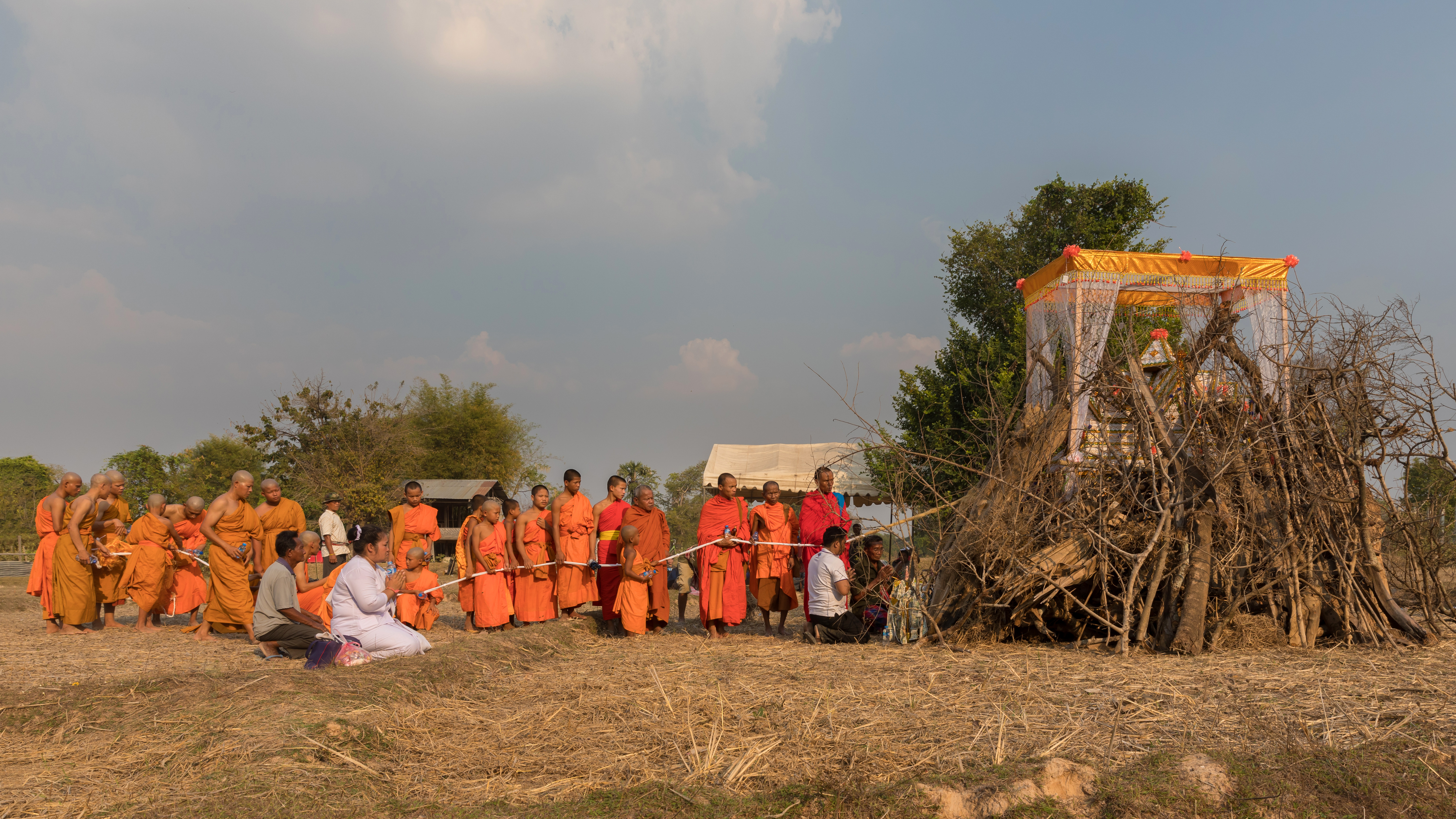
Ritual procession of Buddhist monks in front of a coffin over a pyre before lighting the fire, during funerals in the countryside of Don Det. Holding a rope linked to the coffin is a ritual called chungsob (Lao: ຈູງສົບ) in relation with the soul of the deceased. This rope will not be incinerated and may be kept by the monks. Traditionally, cotton strings play an important role in ceremonies in Laos, like in the baci, and can be used in various ways at diverse occasions. In front of the coffin, there is a Buddhist money tree, religious item with authentic banknotes, an offering to the monks.

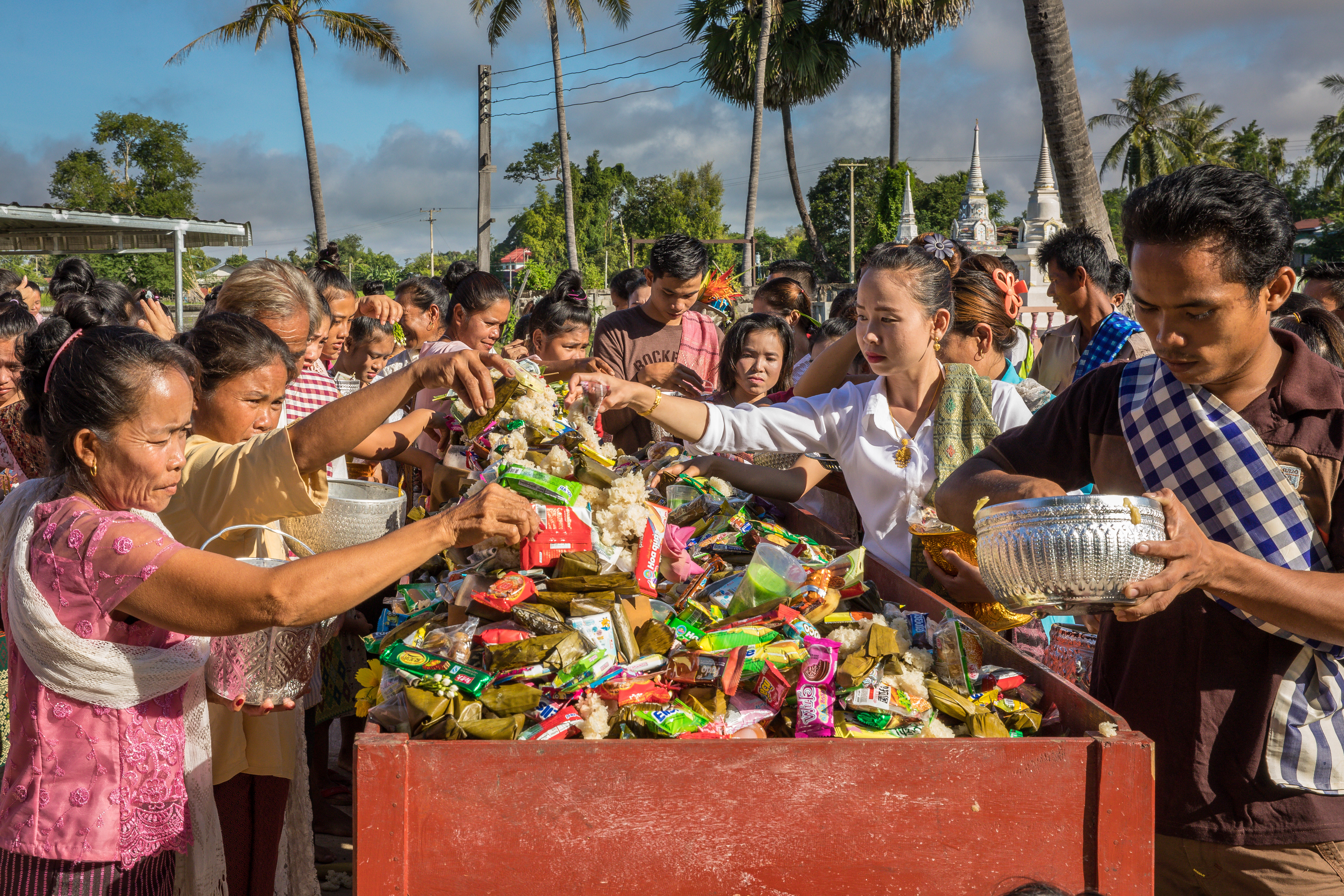
Day of the ghosts (Boun kao padap din), the people of the village of Don Det offer rice, biscuits and home-made cakes to the monks at the temple.

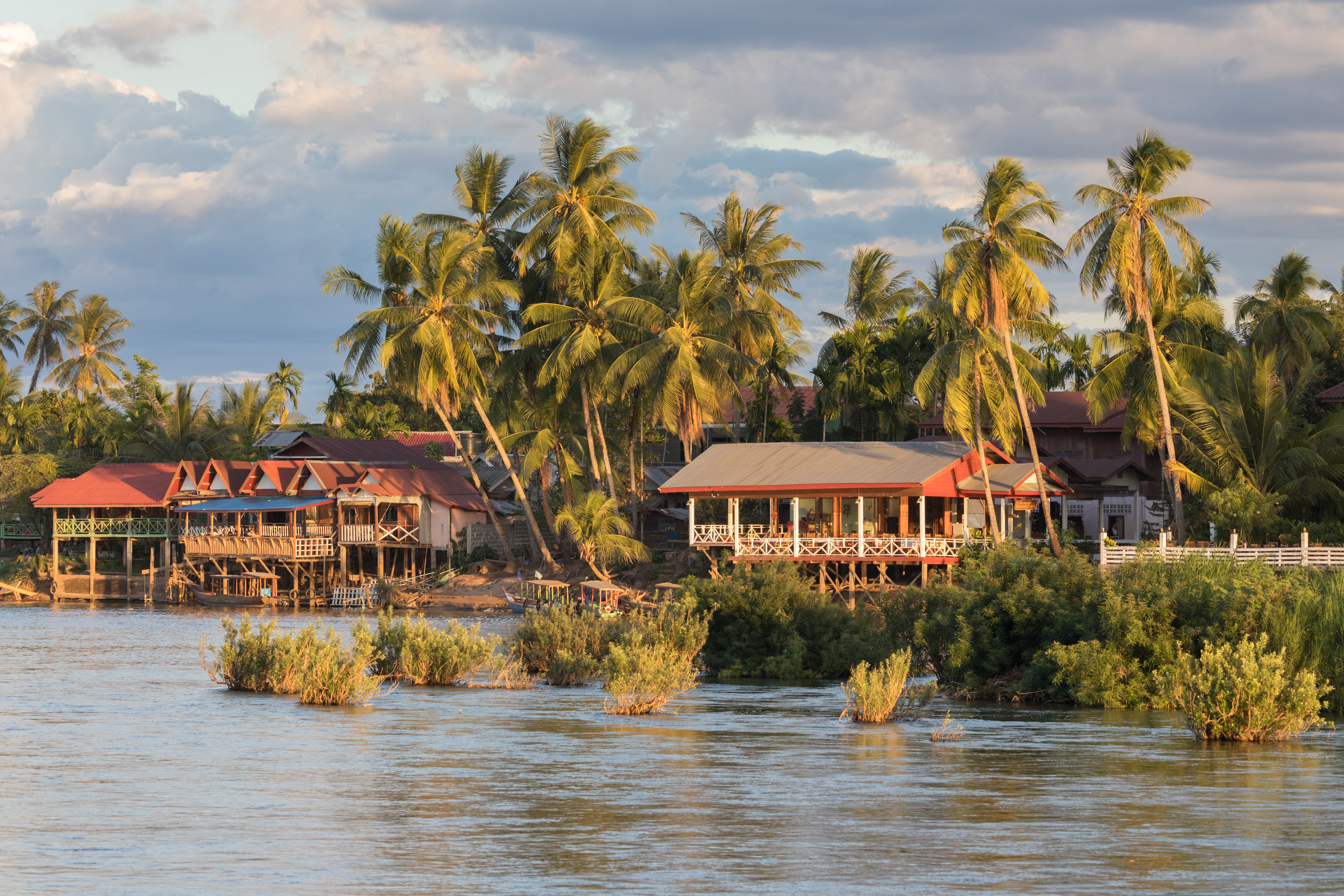
View from Don Det: river bank of the twin island Don Khon, with stilt wooden houses.

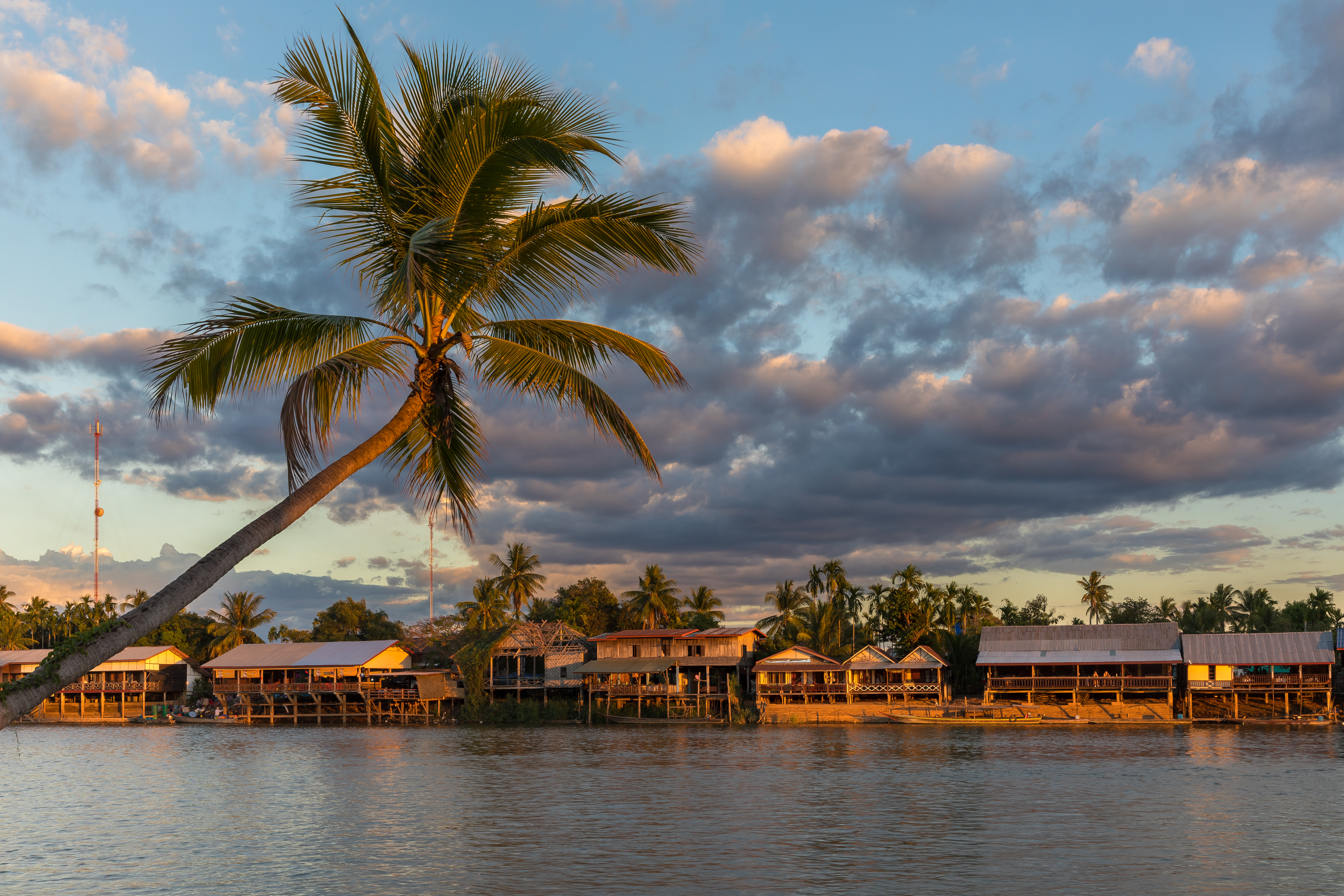
River bank of the island of Don Khon with stilt wooden houses, seen from Don Det with a leaning Arecaceae (palm trees) and colorful clouds.

== Climate ==
Don Det features a tropical wet and dry climate. While the city is generally very warm throughout the year, it is noticeably cooler during December and January. Don Det also experiences wet and dry seasons, with the wet season from April until October, and the dry season during the remaining five months. Temperatures range from 15 °C to 38 °C.

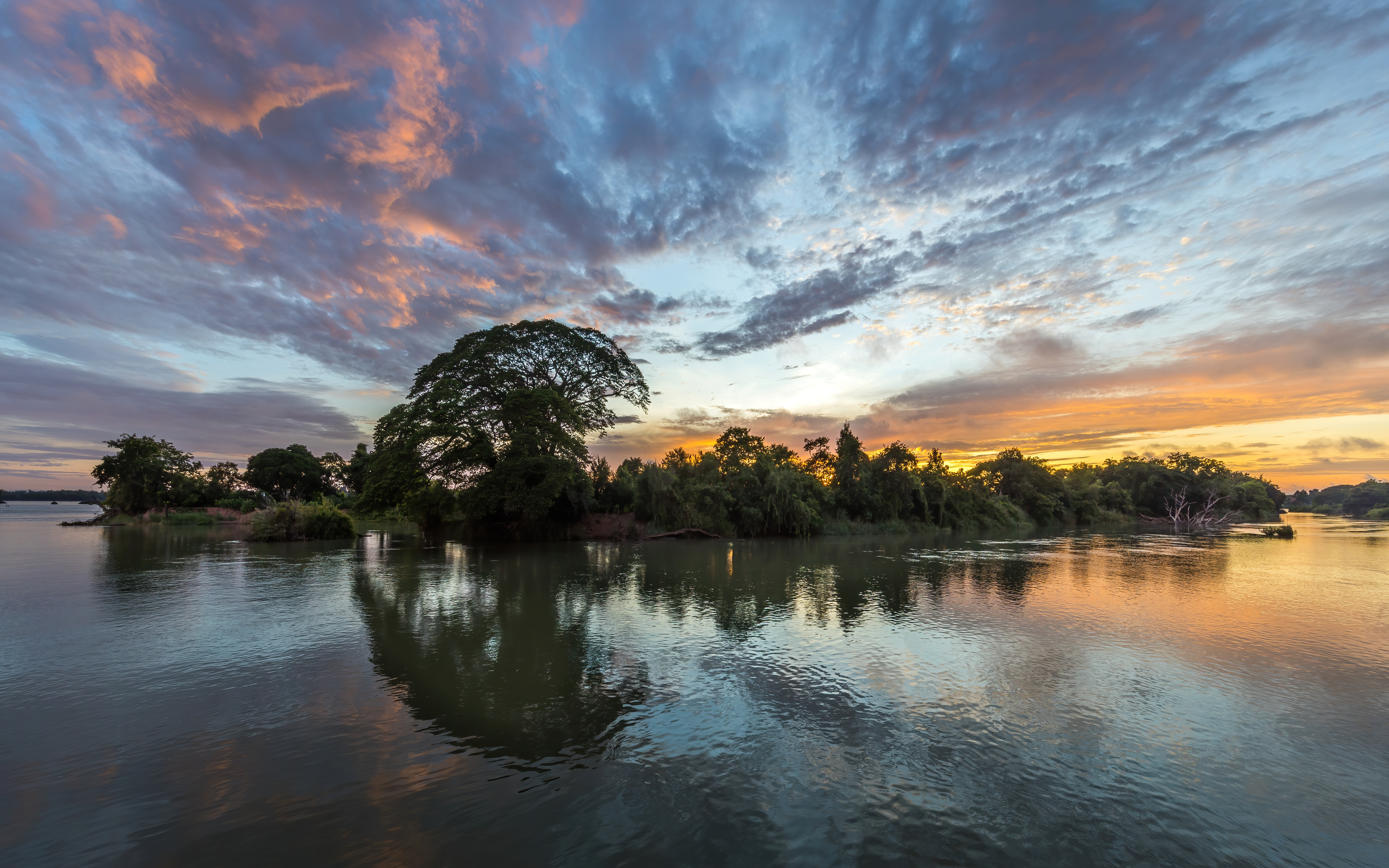
Colorful clouds and blue sky with water reflection of an island hosting a Samanea saman (rain tree) and other trees, at sunrise, in Don Det.

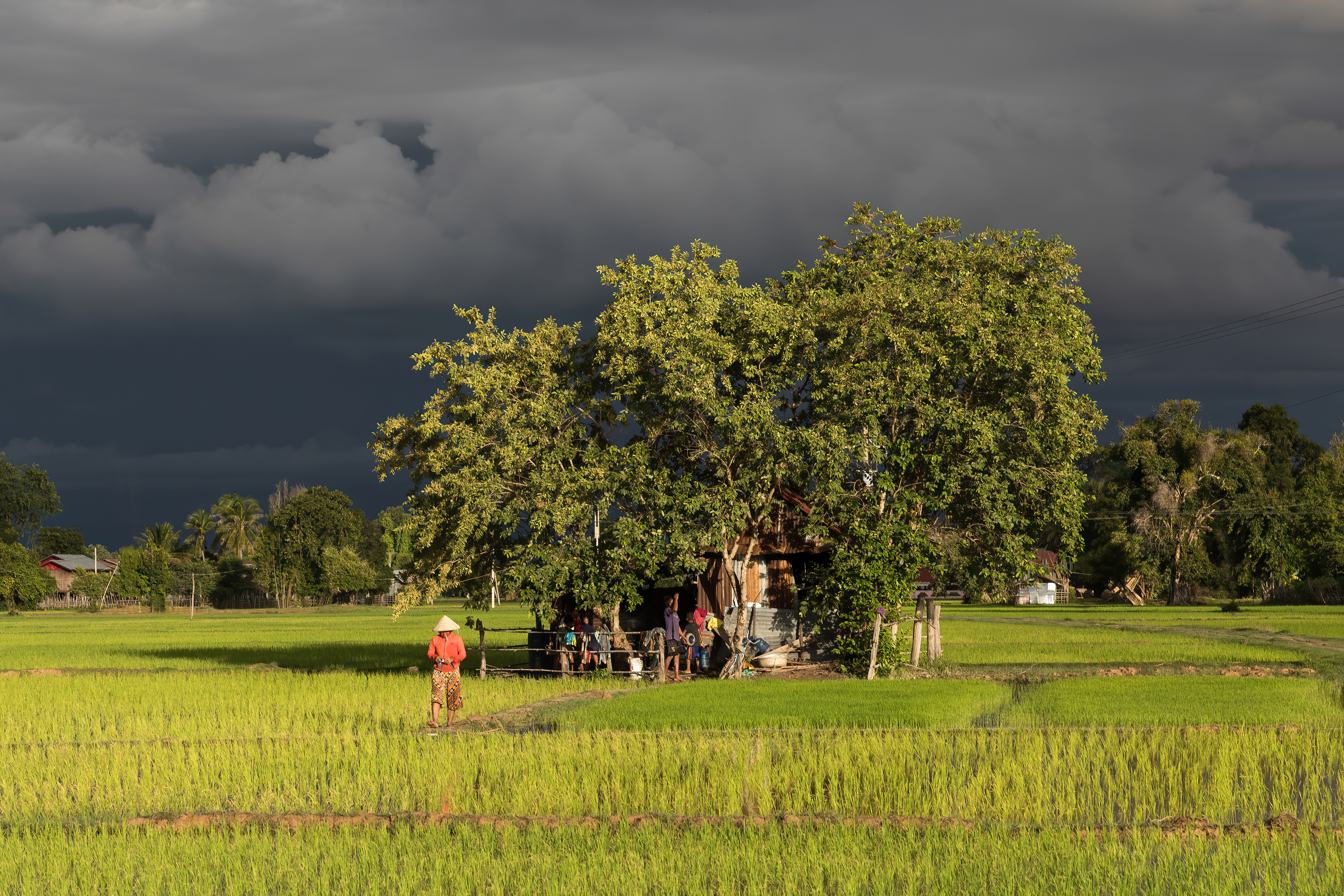
Tiny inhabited house, made of wood and corrugated iron, surrounded by trees and bamboo fences, in the middle of green paddy fields, with long shadows in sunshine under a stormy sky, and a woman wearing a red sweater and a conical straw hat walking in front, at golden hour, during the monsoon, in Don Det.

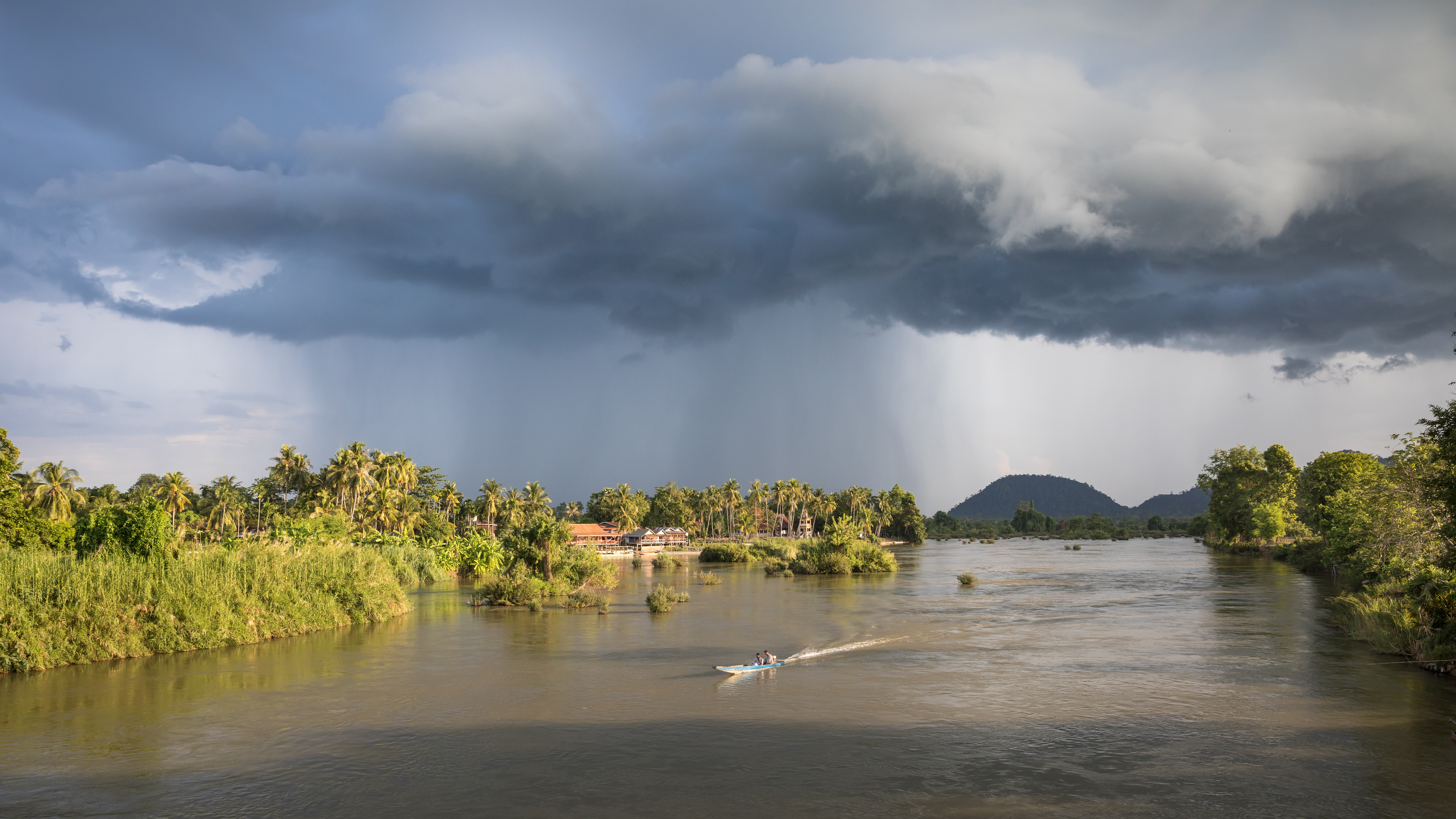
Landscape with stormy clouds and a pirogue on the Mekong at golden hour, from the bridge between Don Det and Don Khon.

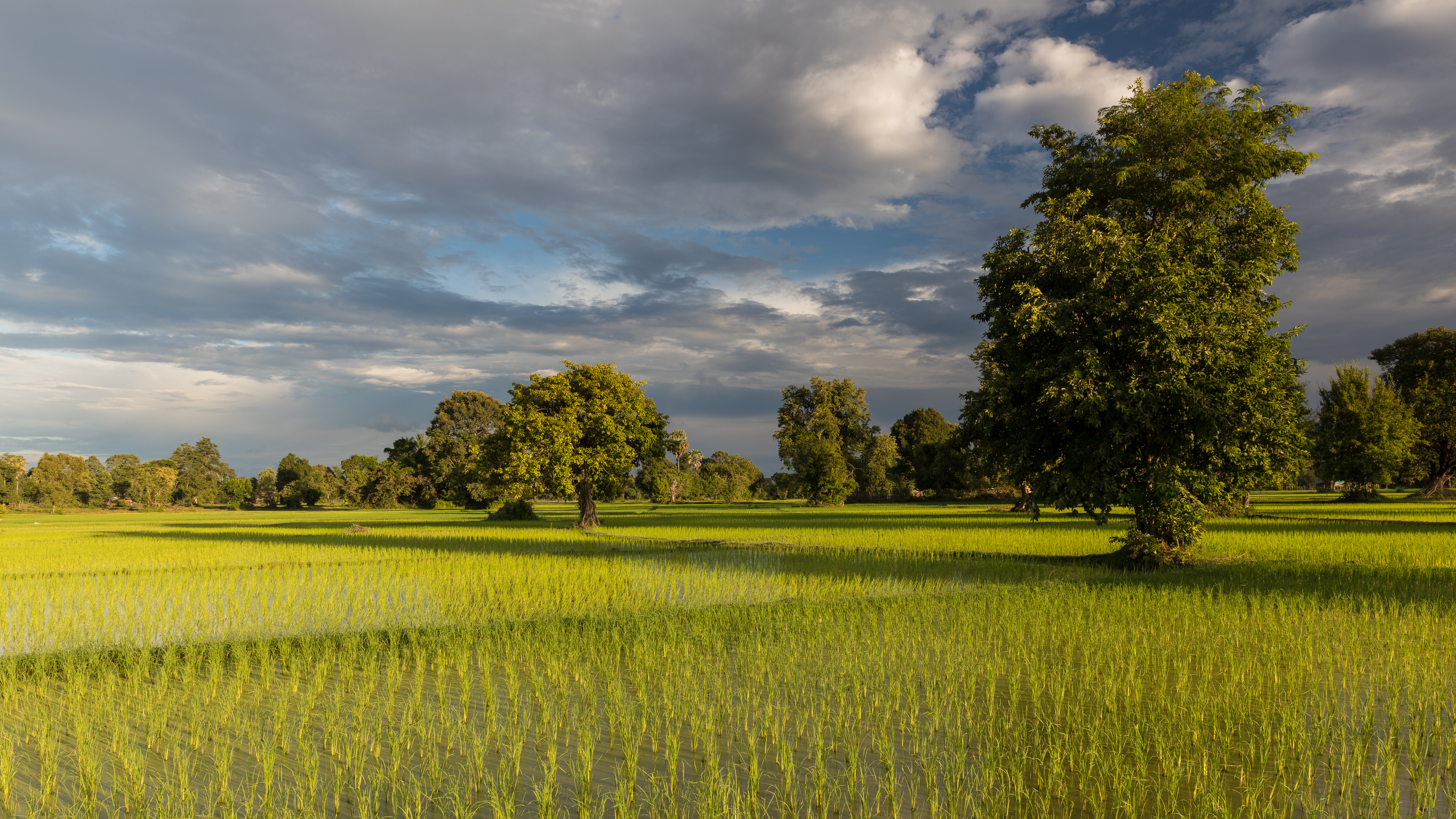
Sunny green paddy fields with trees and long shadows at golden hour, during the monsoon, in Don Det.

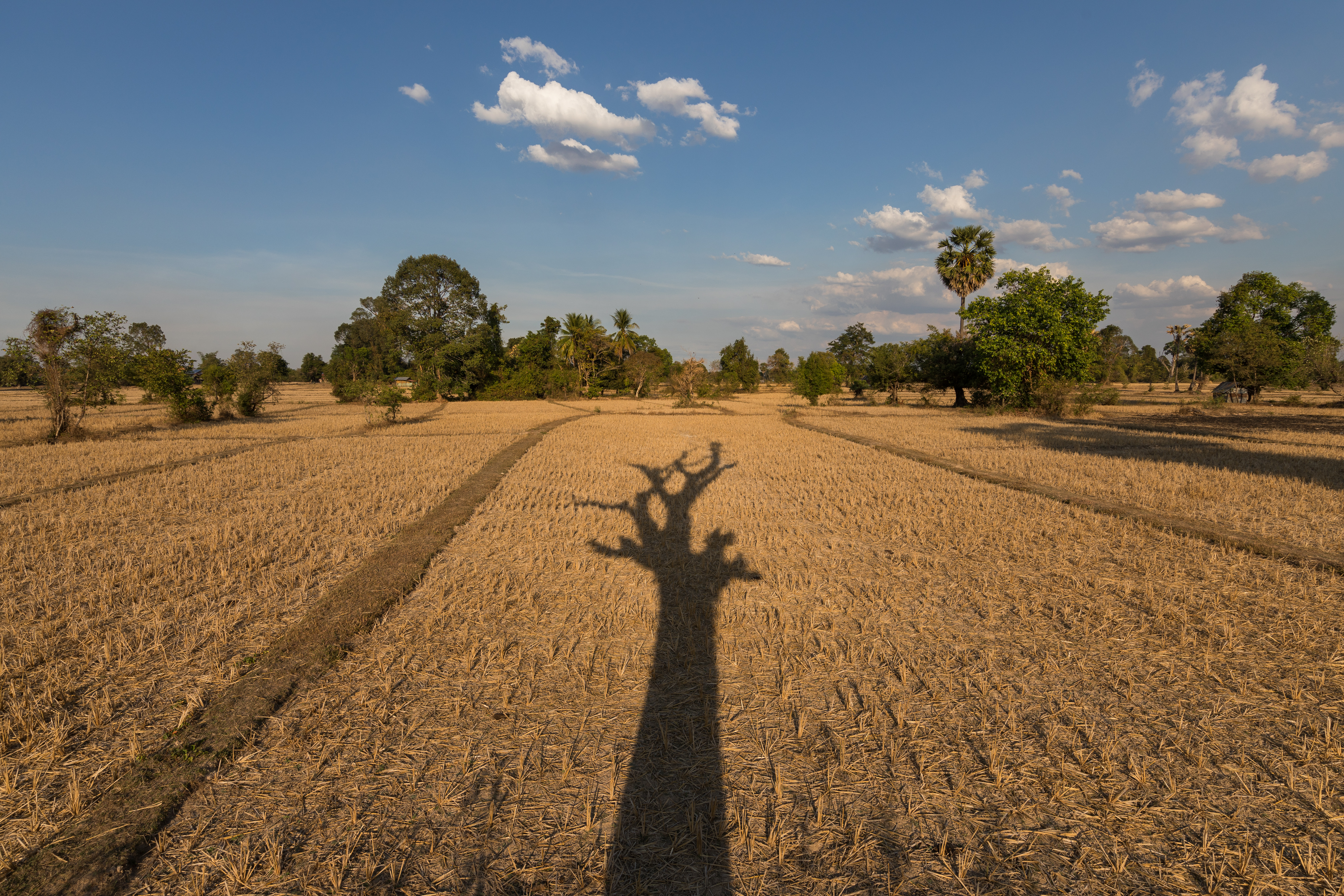
Long shadow of a dead tree with its branches on the dry fields of Don Det, a sunny day with blue sky and white clouds, late afternoon during the dry season.

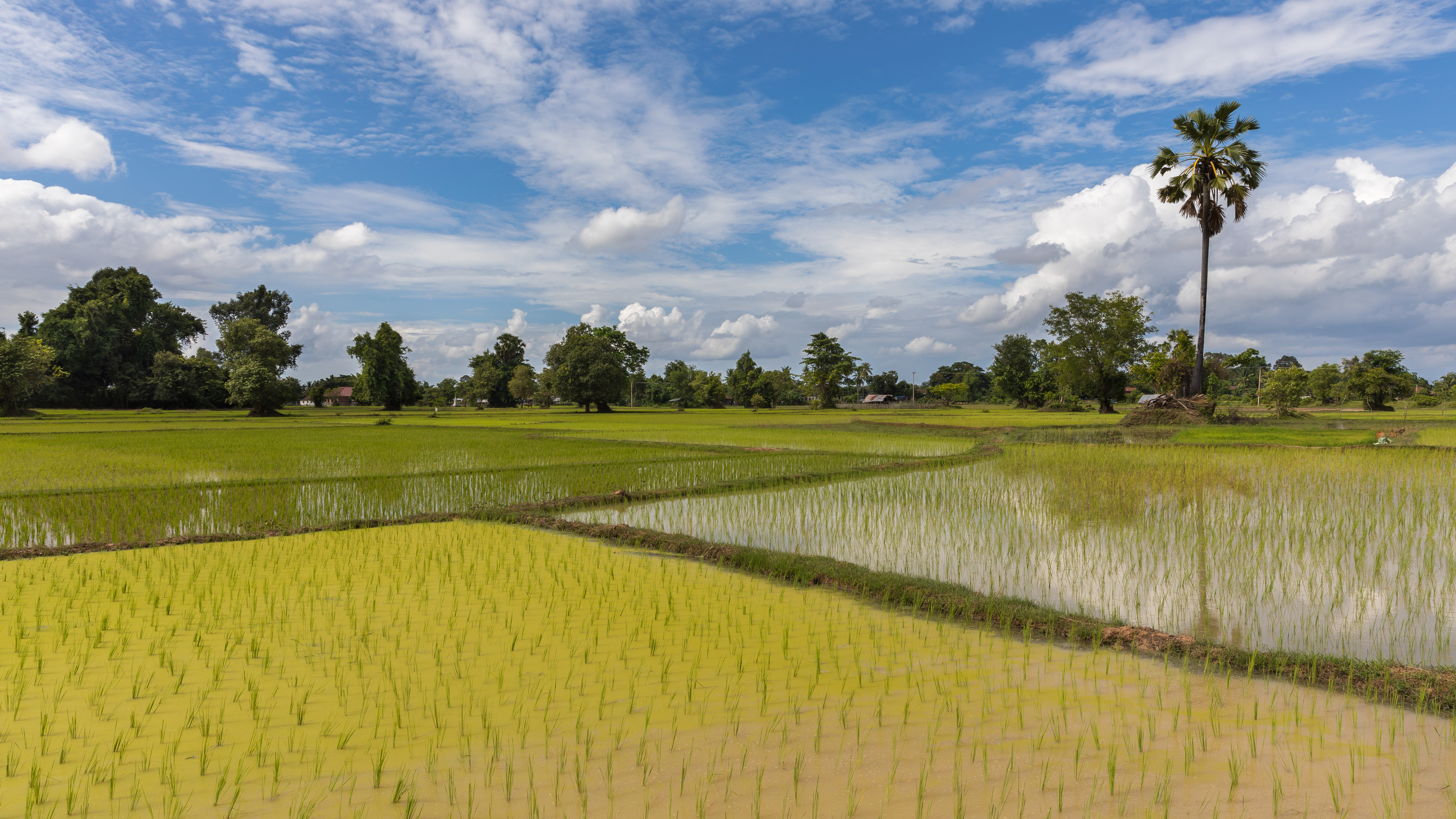
Opaque and mirroring green paddy fields with palm tree in Don Det.

== Tourism ==
The Khone Phapheng Falls, a succession of impassable rapids that gave rise to the construction of the railway, are among the main features accessible from Don Det. Freshwater Irrawaddy dolphins (pakha), an endangered species, are now extinct.

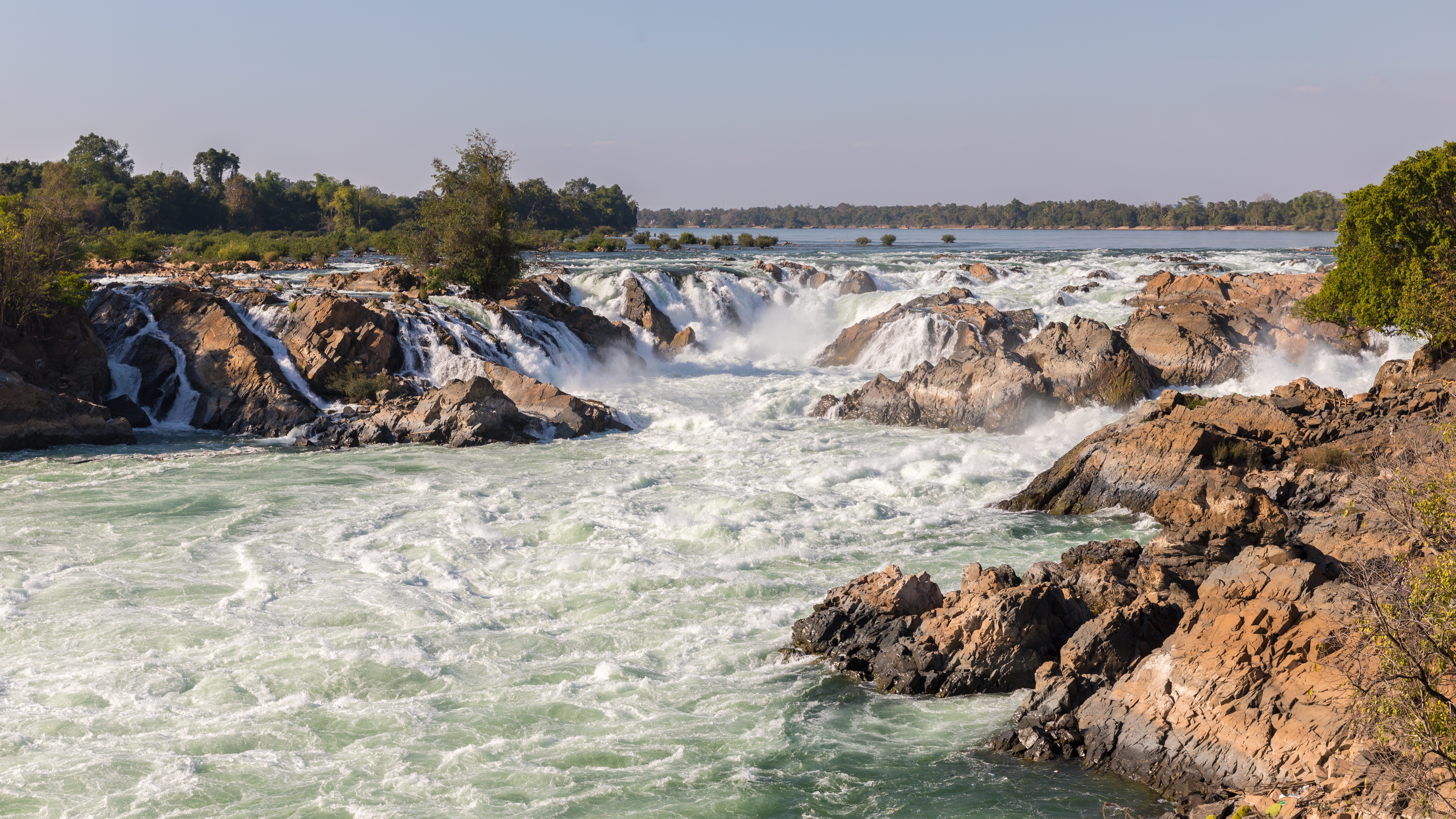
Khone Phapheng Falls, located on the Mekong River near the border with Cambodia, at 10.7 km (6.6 mi) wide, it is the widest waterfall in the world.

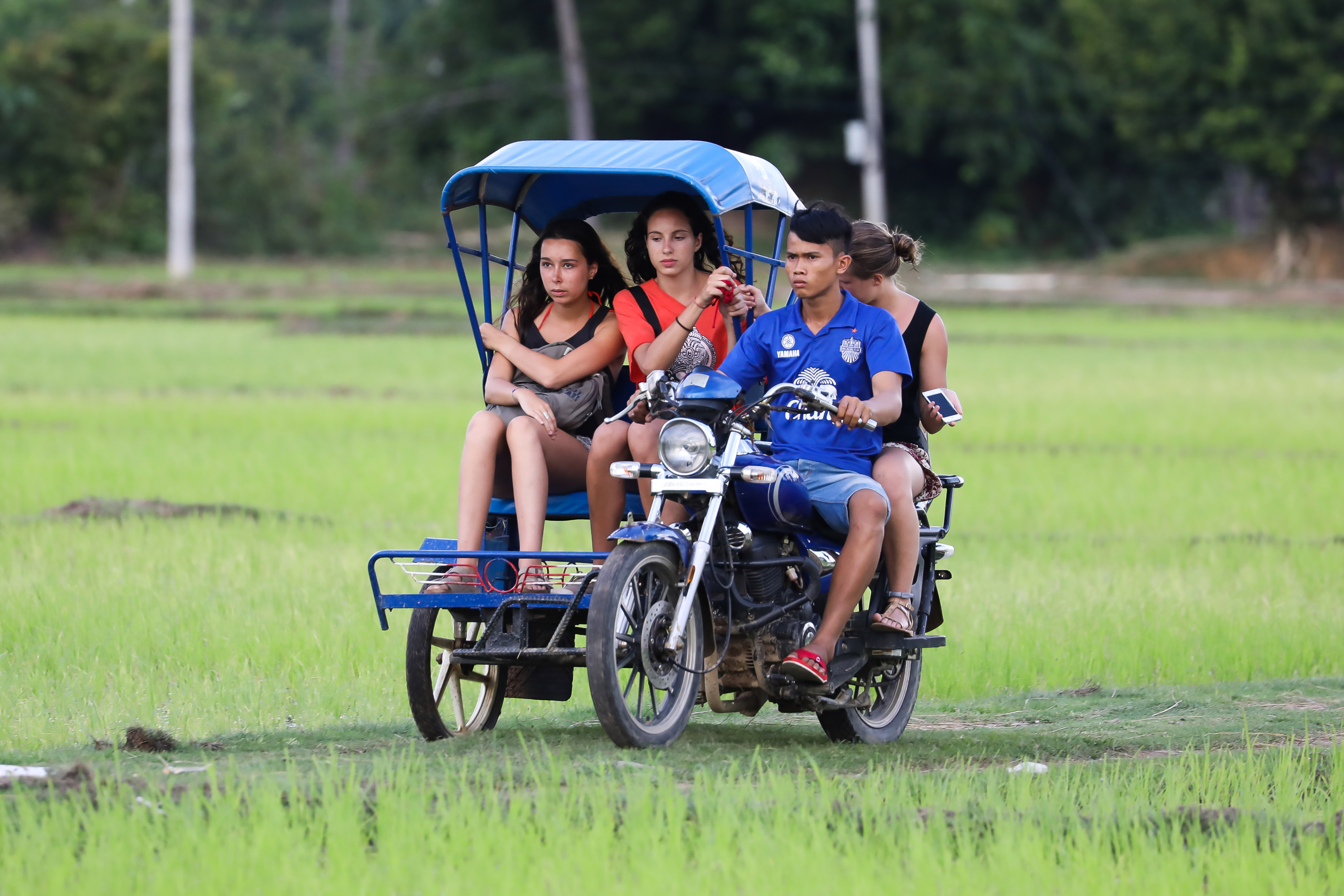
Transportation of three tourists by tuk-tuk in Don Det.

== Wildlife ==
Irrawaddy dolphins, water buffaloes (Bubalus bubalis), common house geckos (Hemidactylus frenatus), bronze grass skink (Eutropis macularia), and bioluminescent beetles can be seen in Don Det.

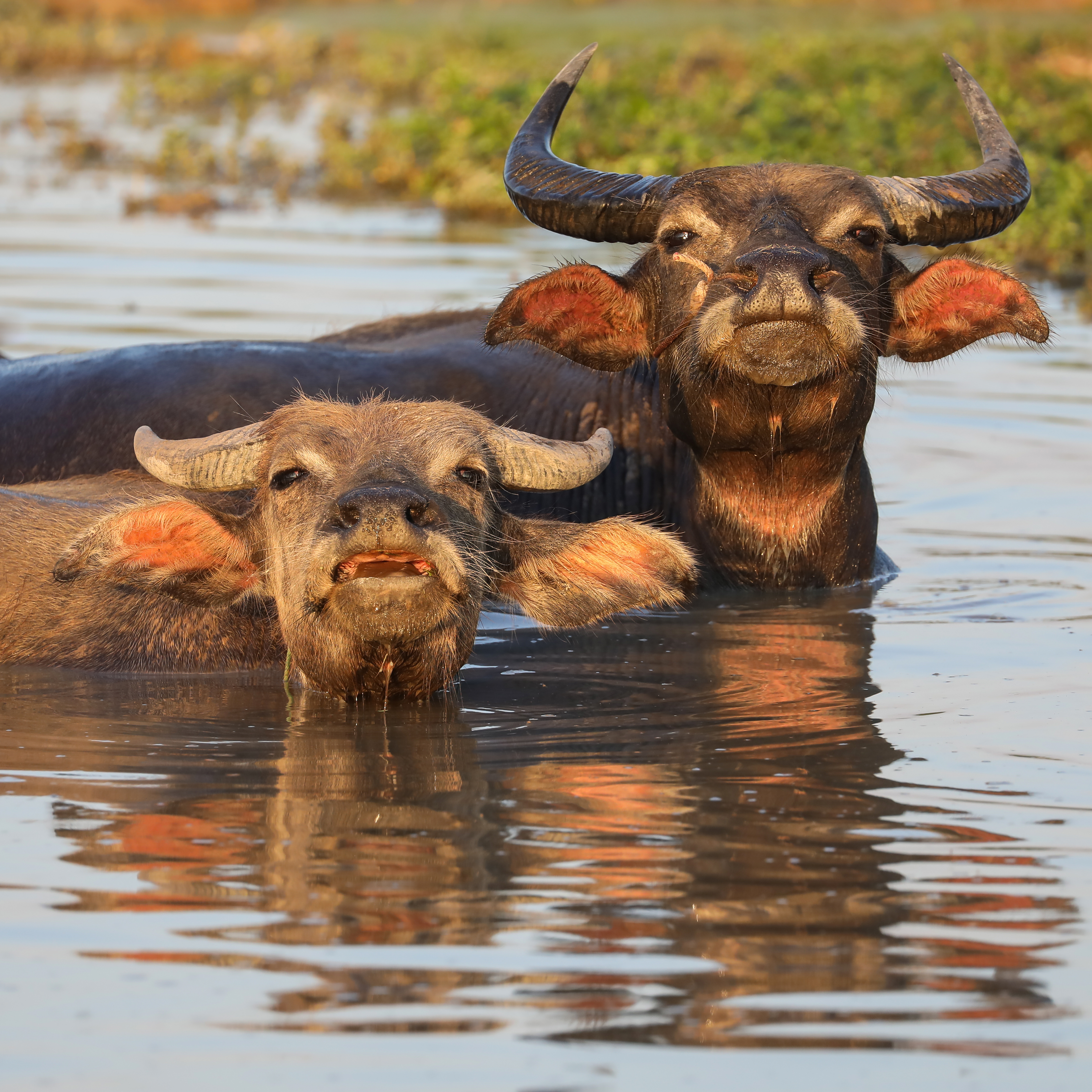
Two Bubalus bubalis (water buffaloes) bathing at sunset in a pond of Don Det. These buffaloes are often cooling themselves in the water (or in the mud), when the weather is hot. One of these domestic animals has a nose rope to facilitate its handling during the growing season, though here in May they are not yet attached, and thus free to move around the island.

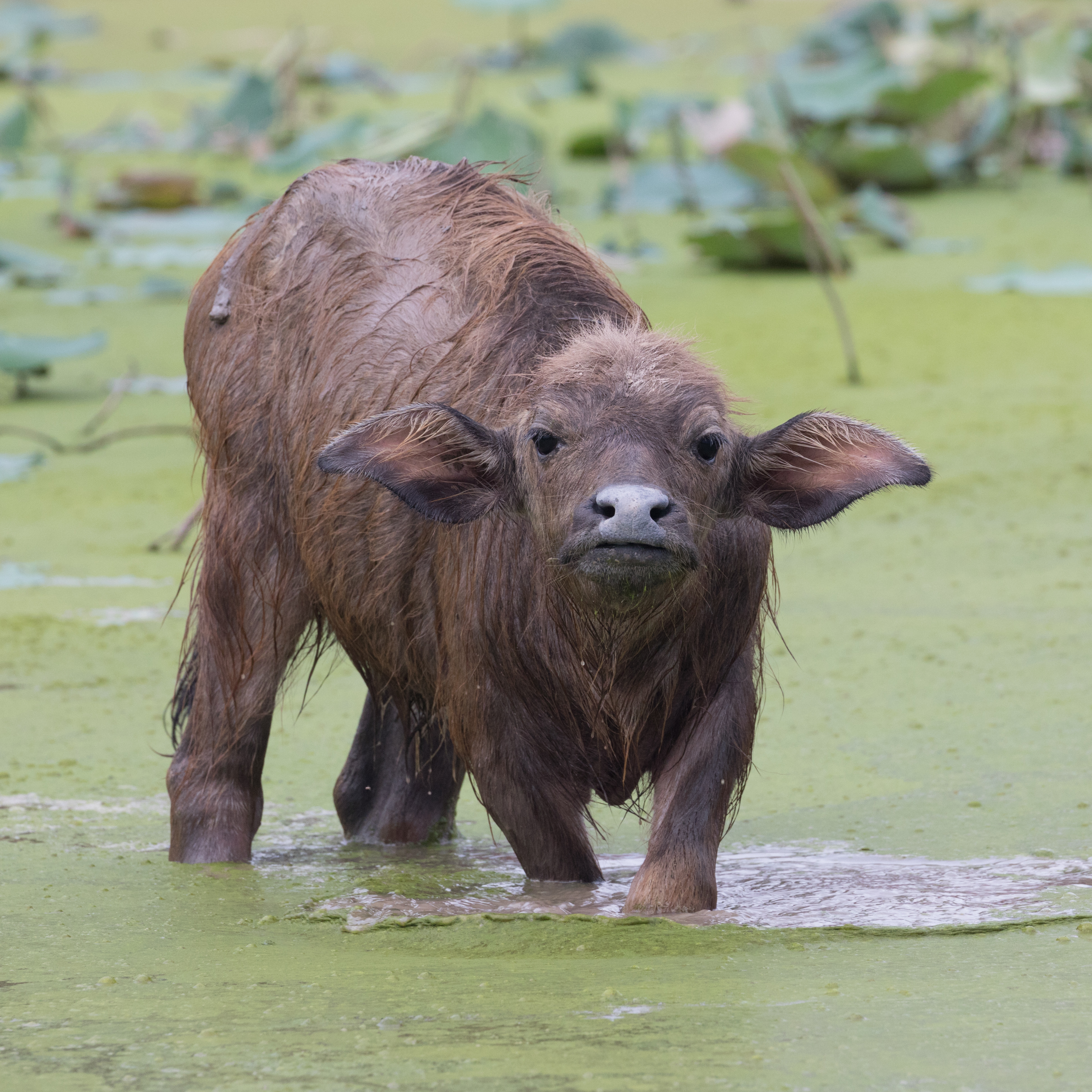
Bubalus bubalis (water buffalo) calf, looking at the viewer, the feet in a pond, in Don Det.

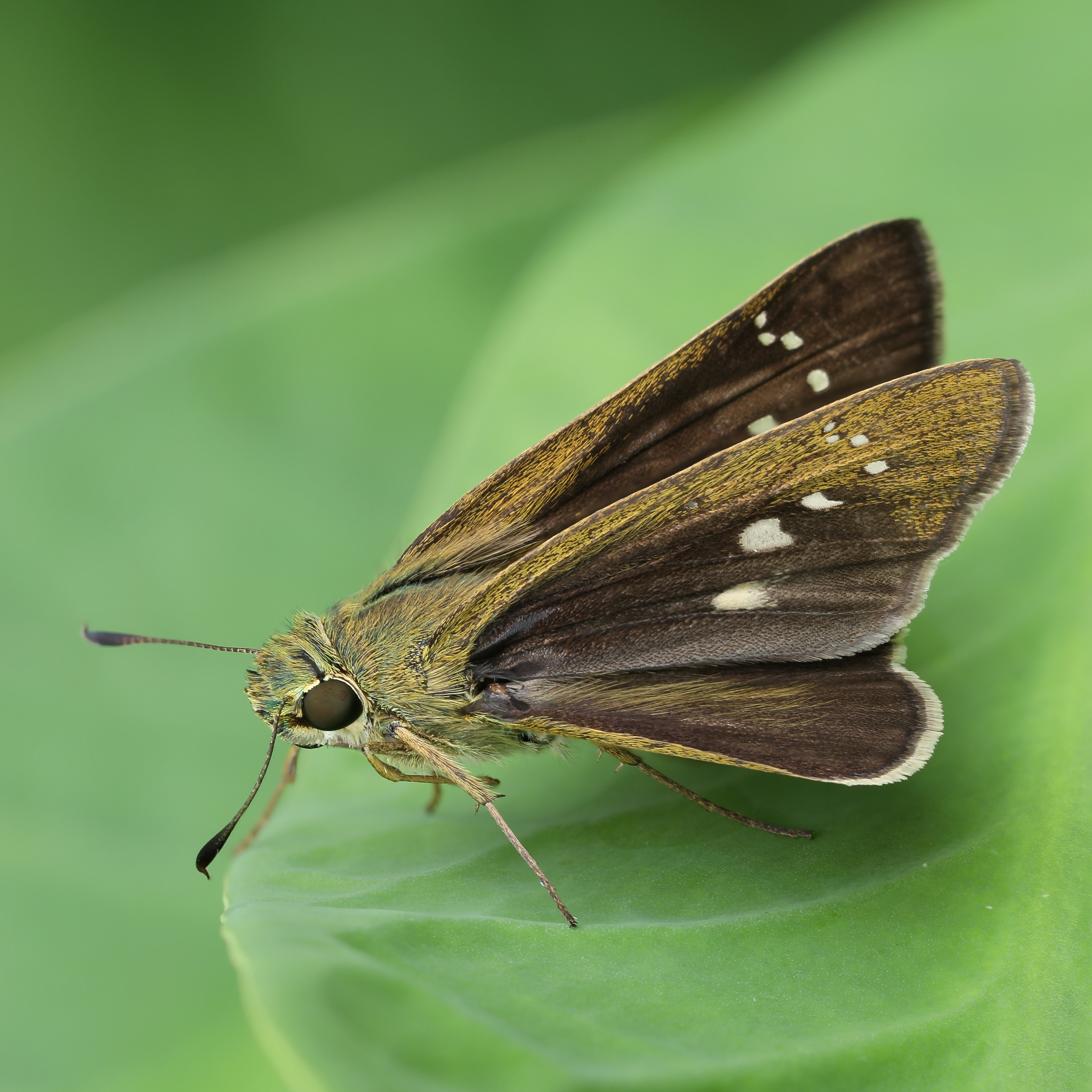
Borbo cinnara (Rice swift) on a leaf, in Don Det.

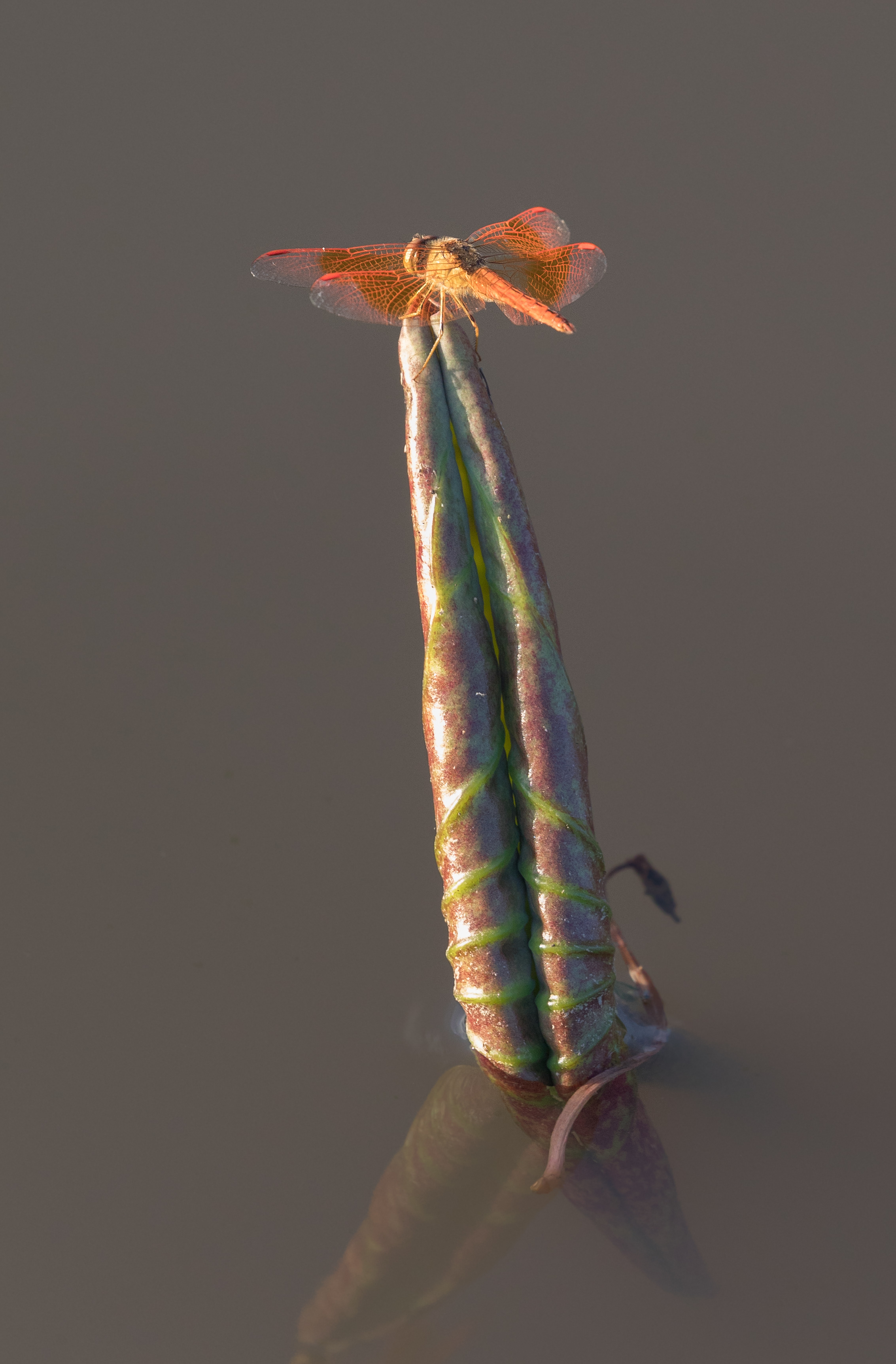
Brachythemis contaminata male, on a conical Nelumbo nucifera leaf bud (Sacred lotus), at the surface of a pond, in Don Det.

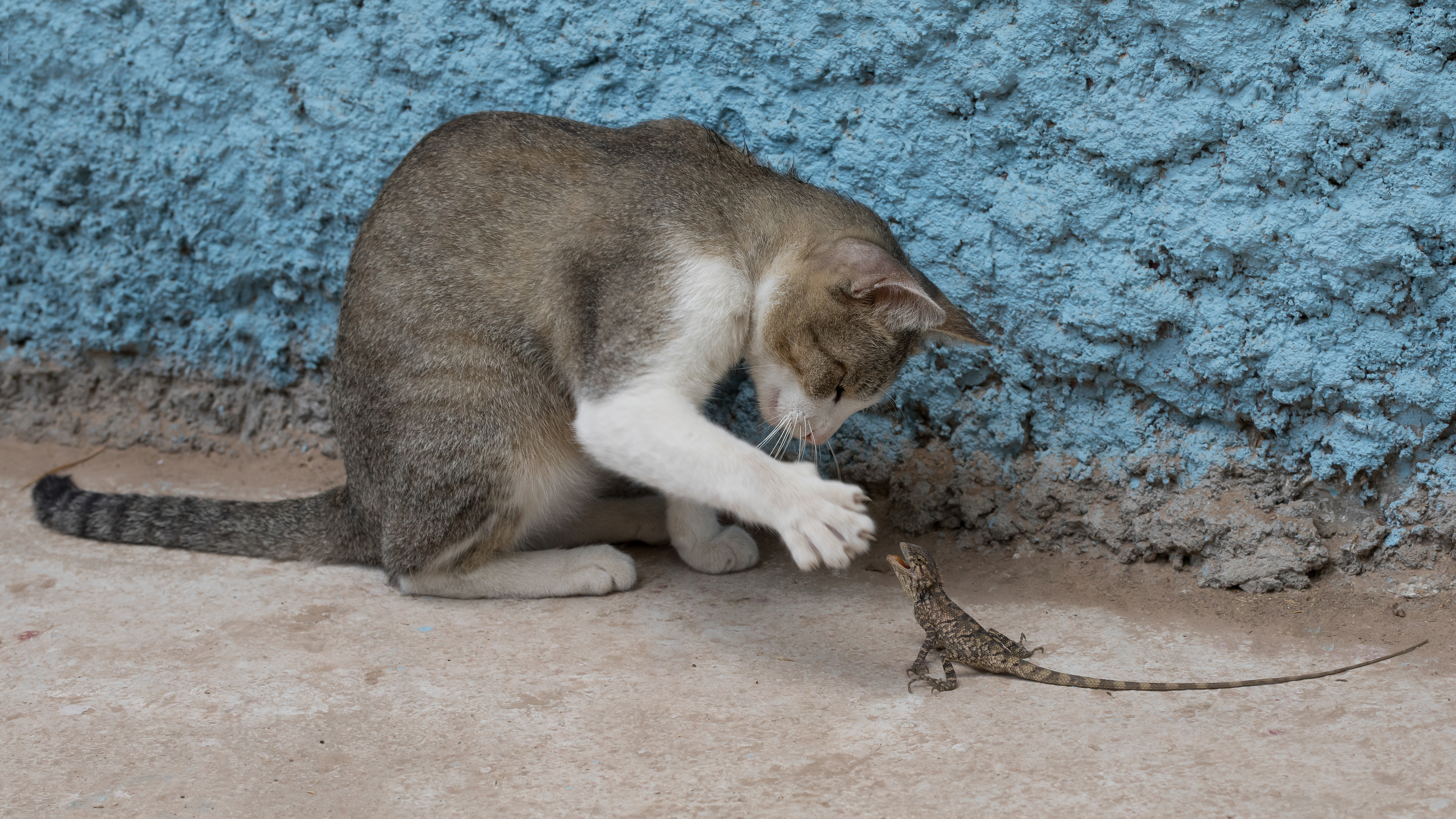
Seated Felis silvestris catus (domestic cat) playing with a passive Calotes versicolor (oriental garden lizard), facing it, in Don Det.

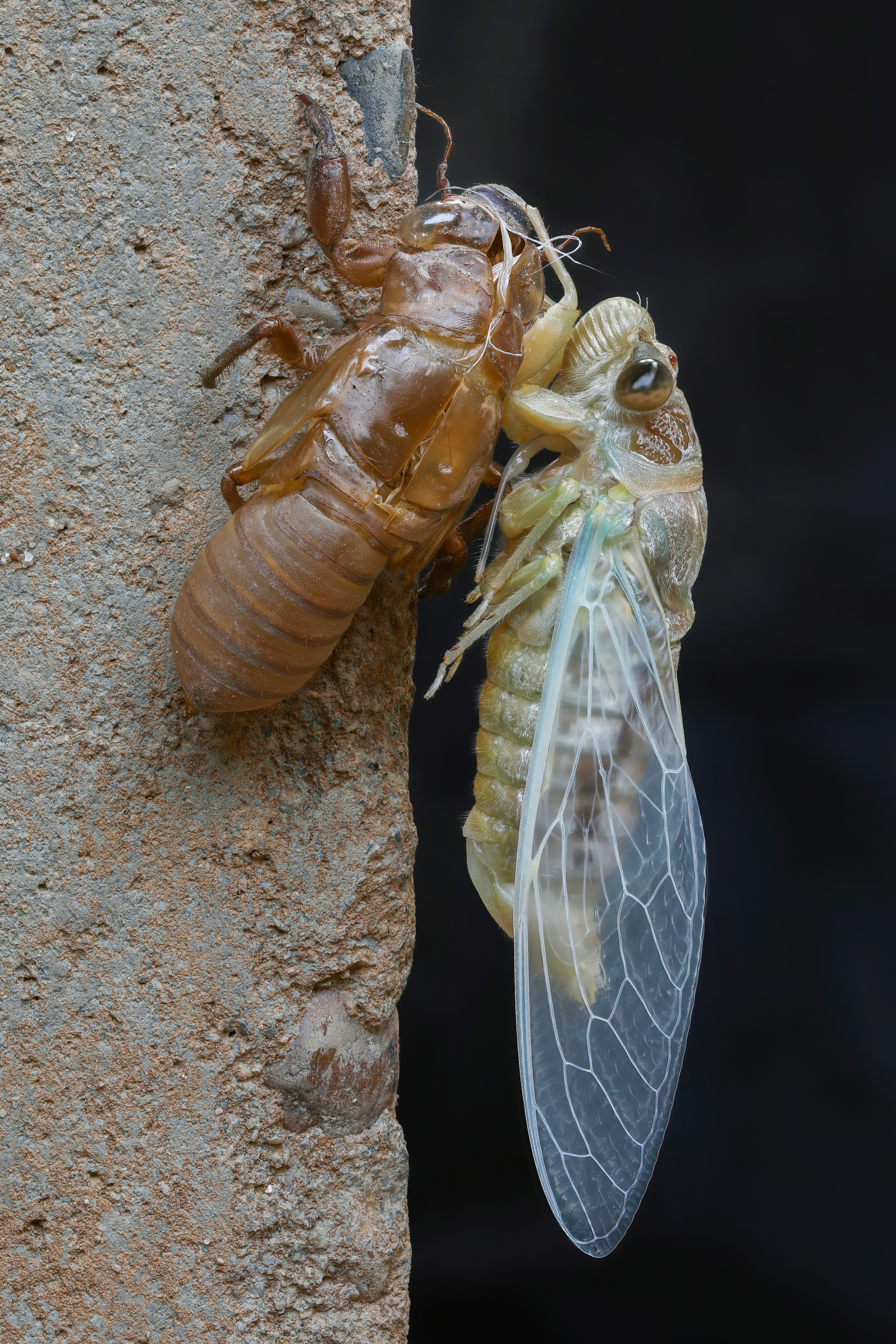
Cicadidae Dundubia (cicada) standing next to its exuvia, immediately after moulting, seen on the island of Don Det.

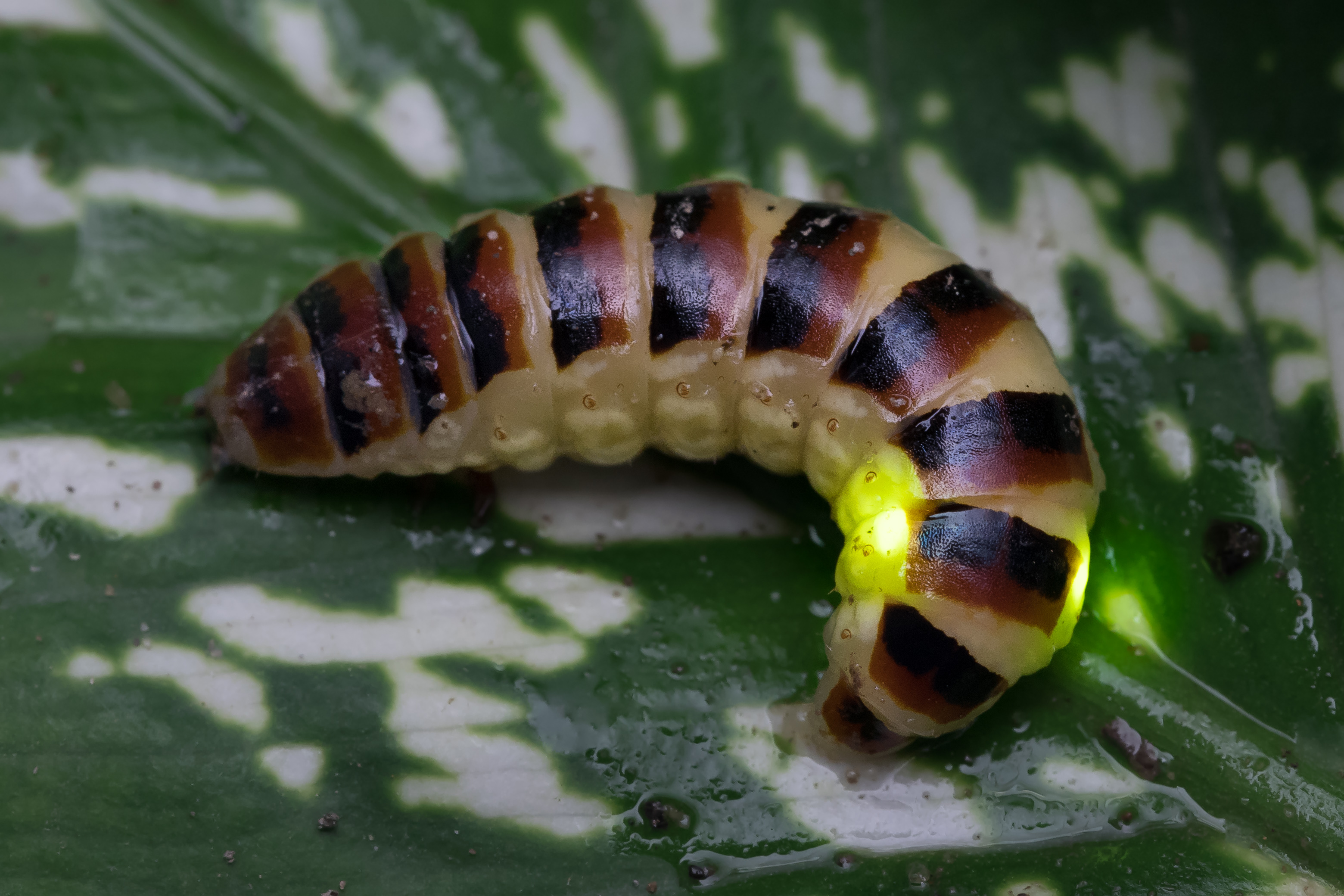
Close-up view of a bioluminescent beetle Elateroidea, on a leaf. The species produces and emits light, via a chemical reaction during which chemical energy is converted into light energy. Bioluminescent beetle species are in regression in the World because of the phenomenon of light pollution, insecticides and climate change. This specimen comes from the island of Don Det.

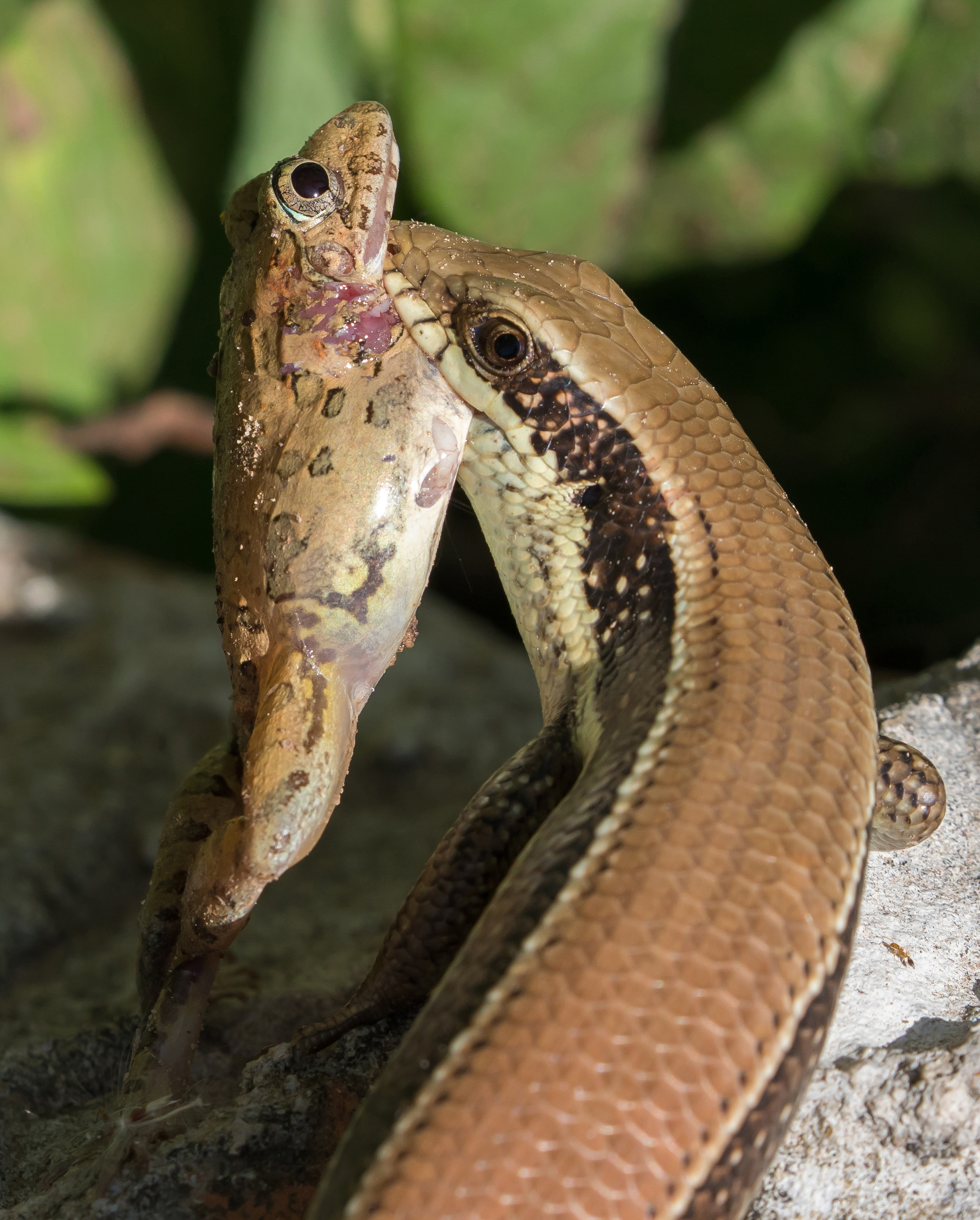
Eutropis macularia (bronze grass skink) eating a frog, in Don Det.

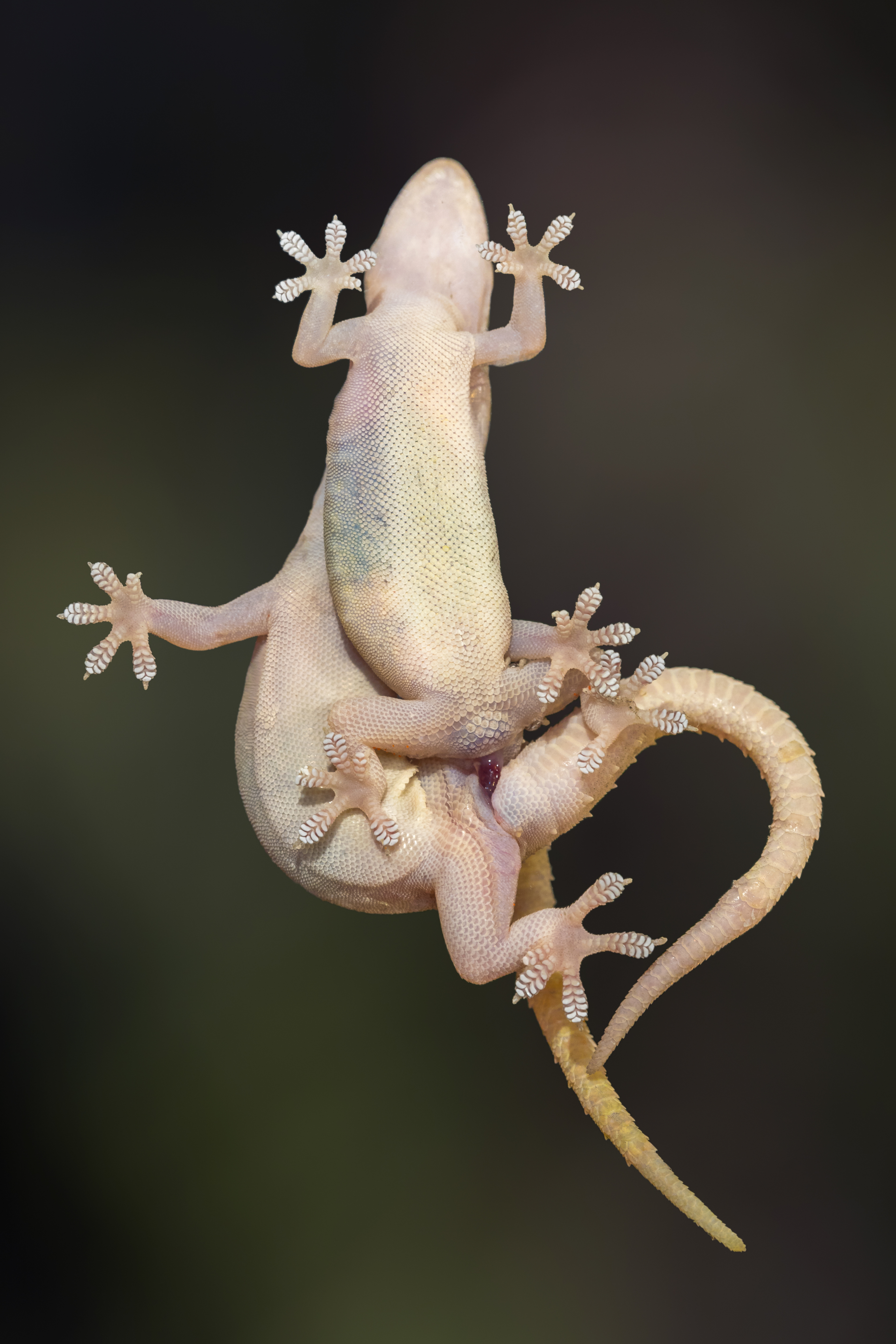
Hemidactylus frenatus (Common House Geckos), mating. The geckos of this region of Laos (island of Don Det) usually appreciate houses, especially the illuminated transparent walls, where they can easily hunt insects attracted by light.

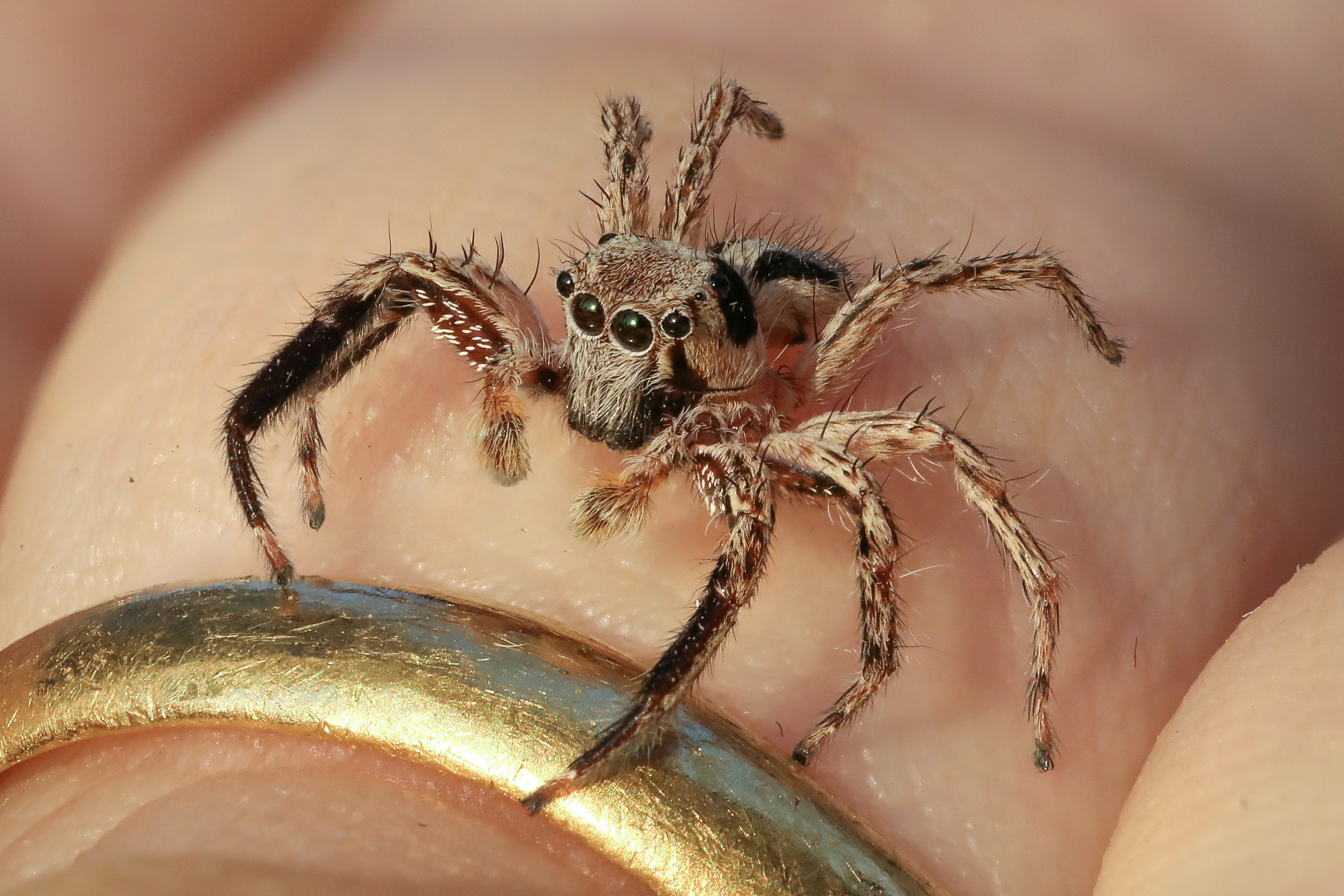
Plexippus petersi (jumping spider), male, on a human finger, at golden hour in Don Det.

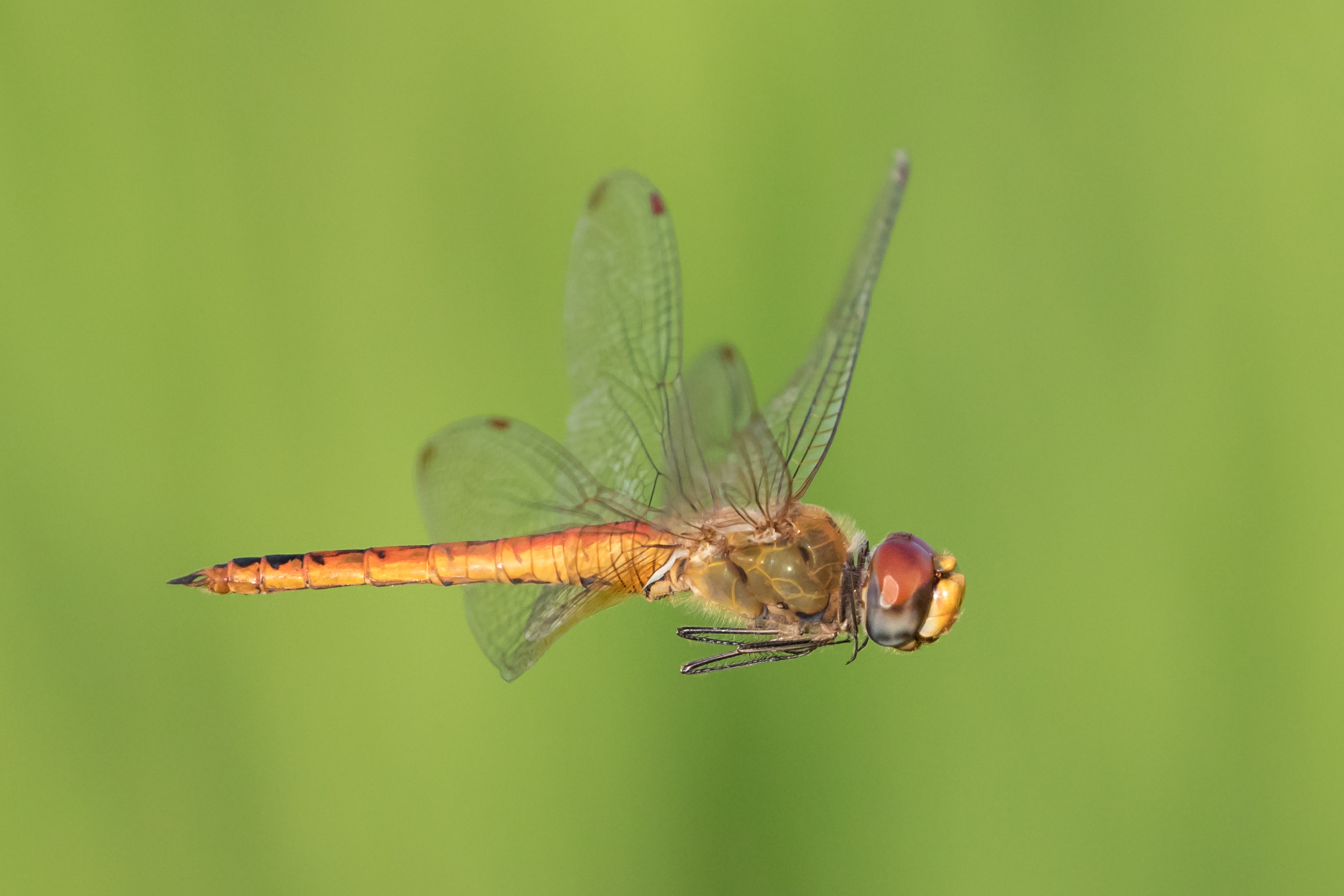
Pantala flavescens (globe skimmer) male, in flight, in a paddy field of Don Det.

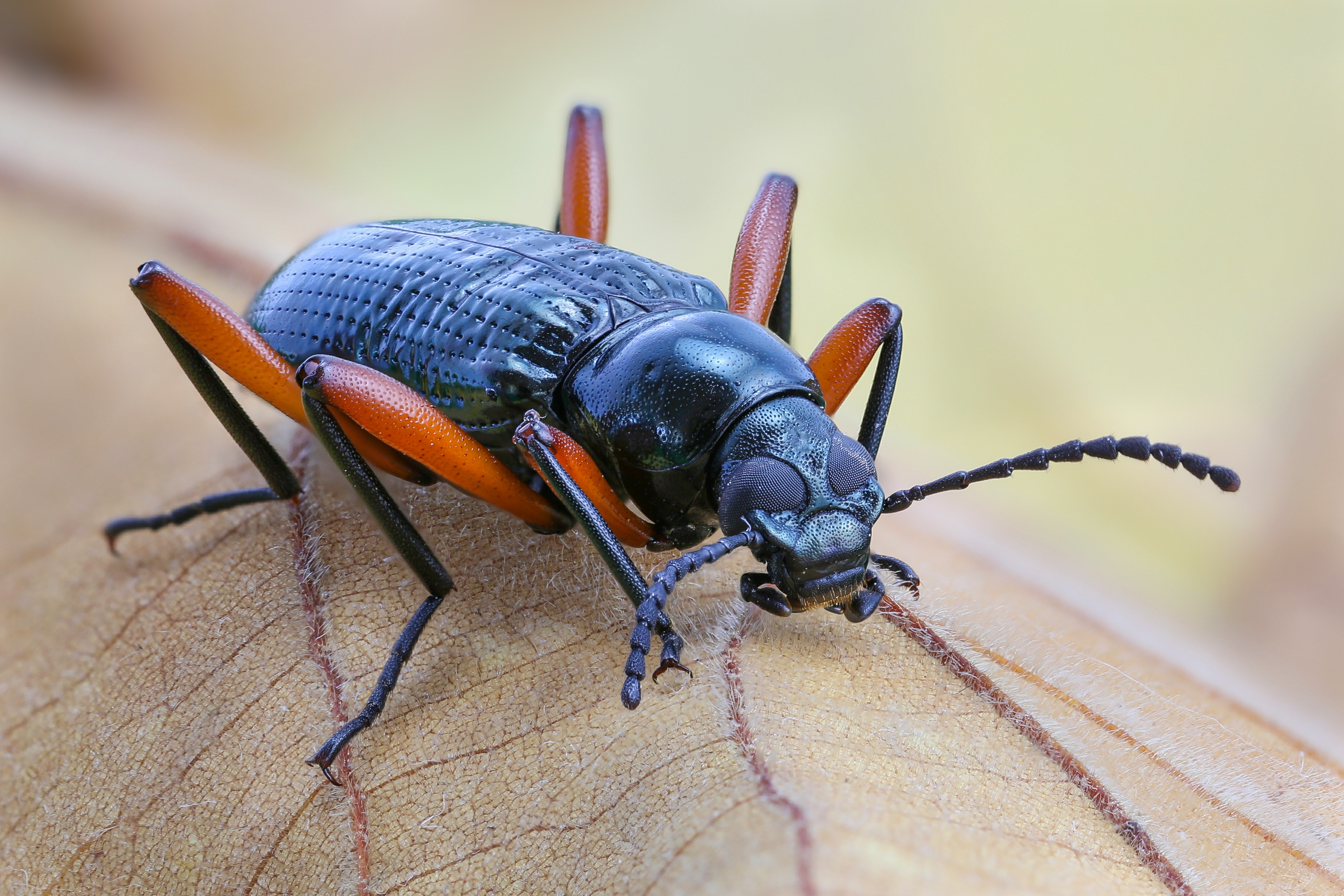
Tenebrionidae Strongylium (Darkling beetle) on a leaf, in Don Det.

== Gallery ==
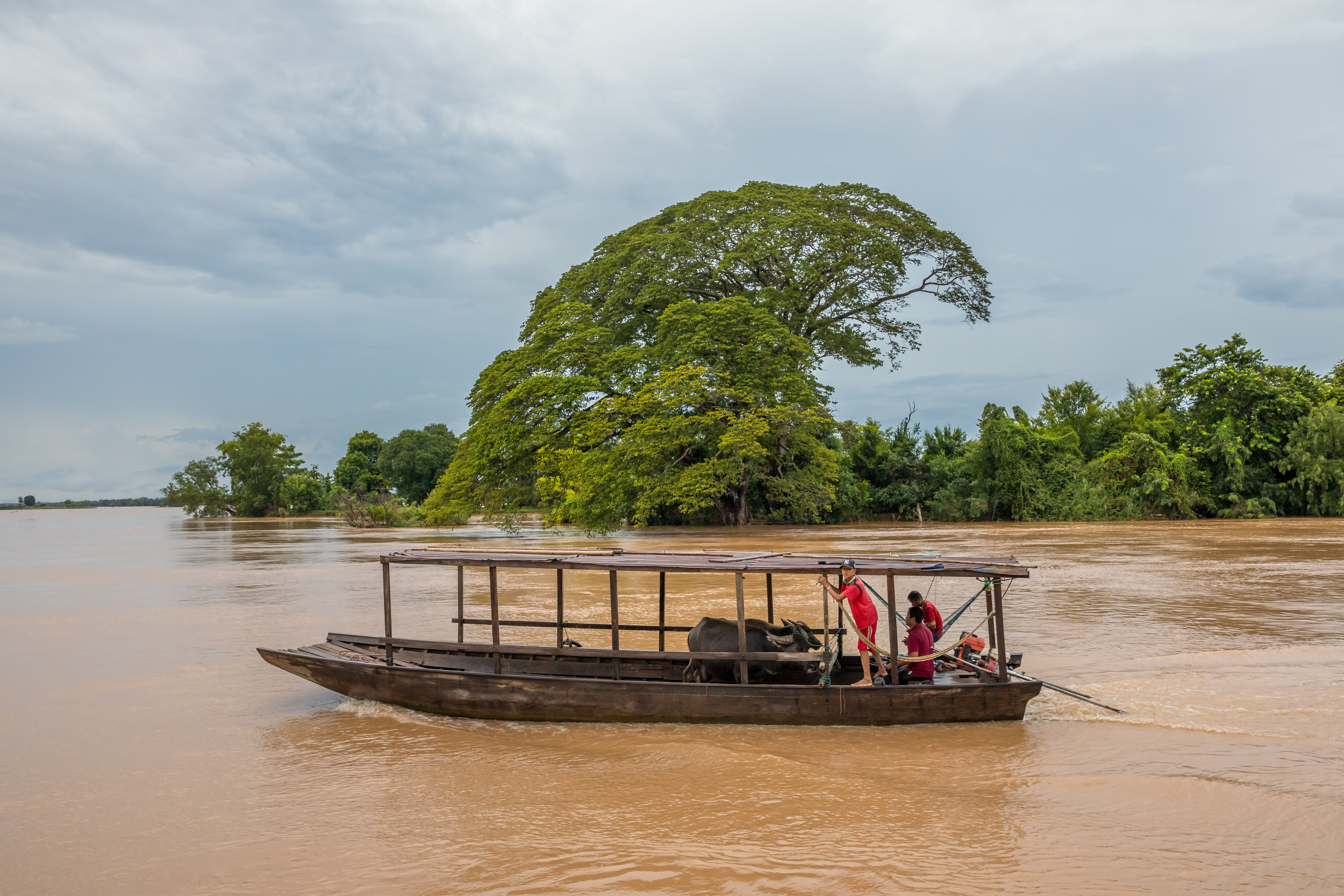
Transport of buffaloes on the Mekong, Don Det

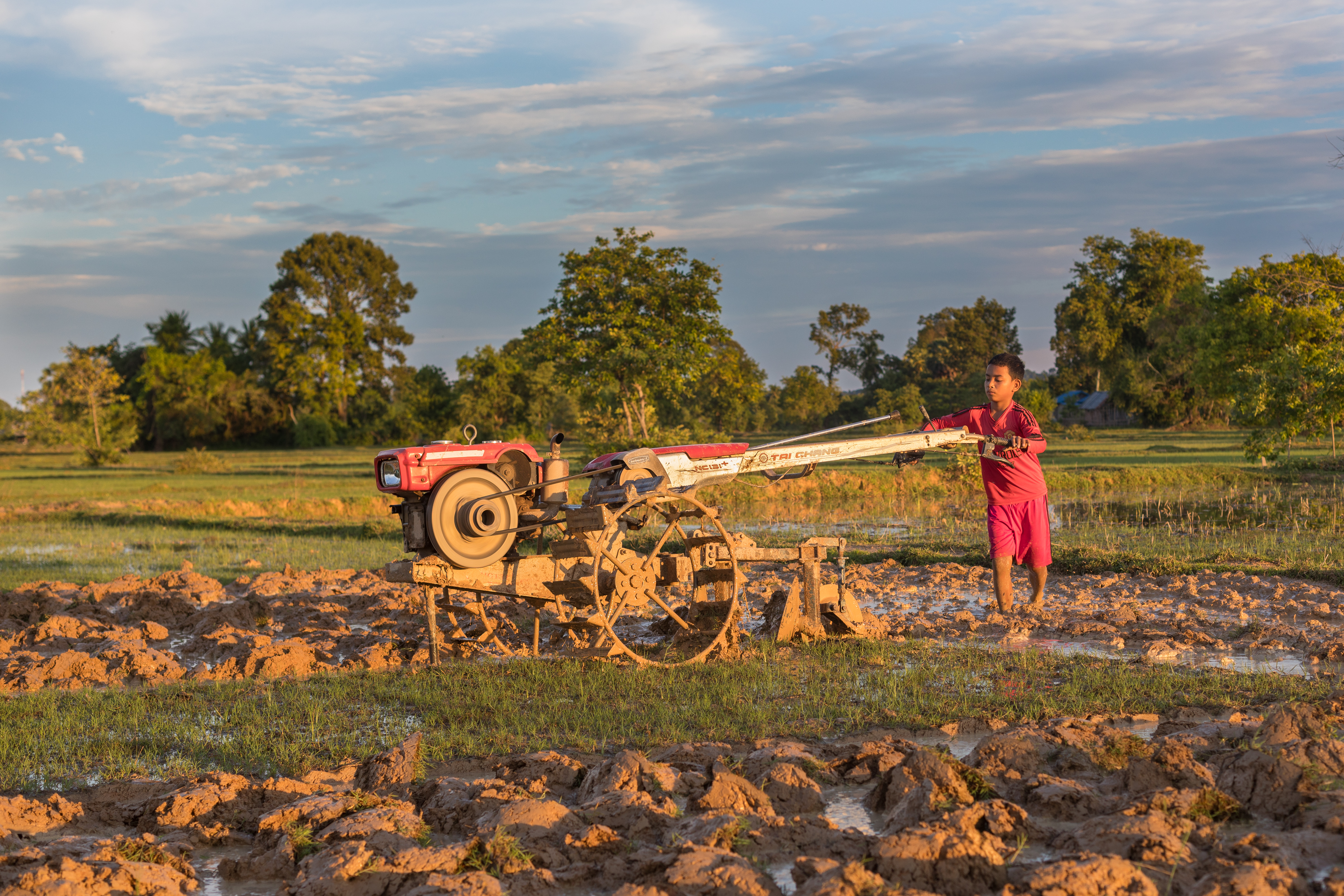
Boy plowing with a tractor at sunset on the island

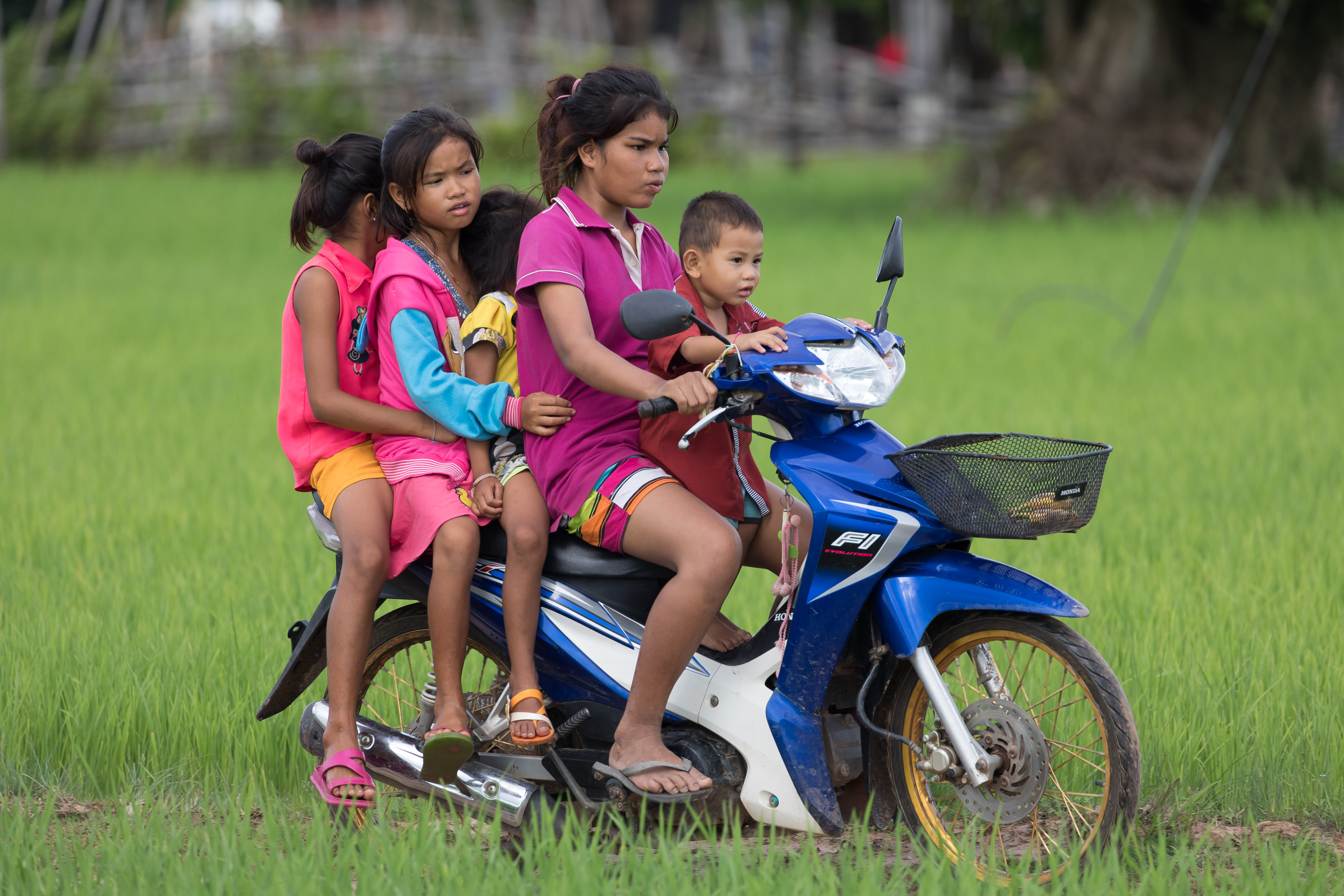
Young girl riding a motorcycle in the rice fields of Don Det, Laos, with four other children passengers.

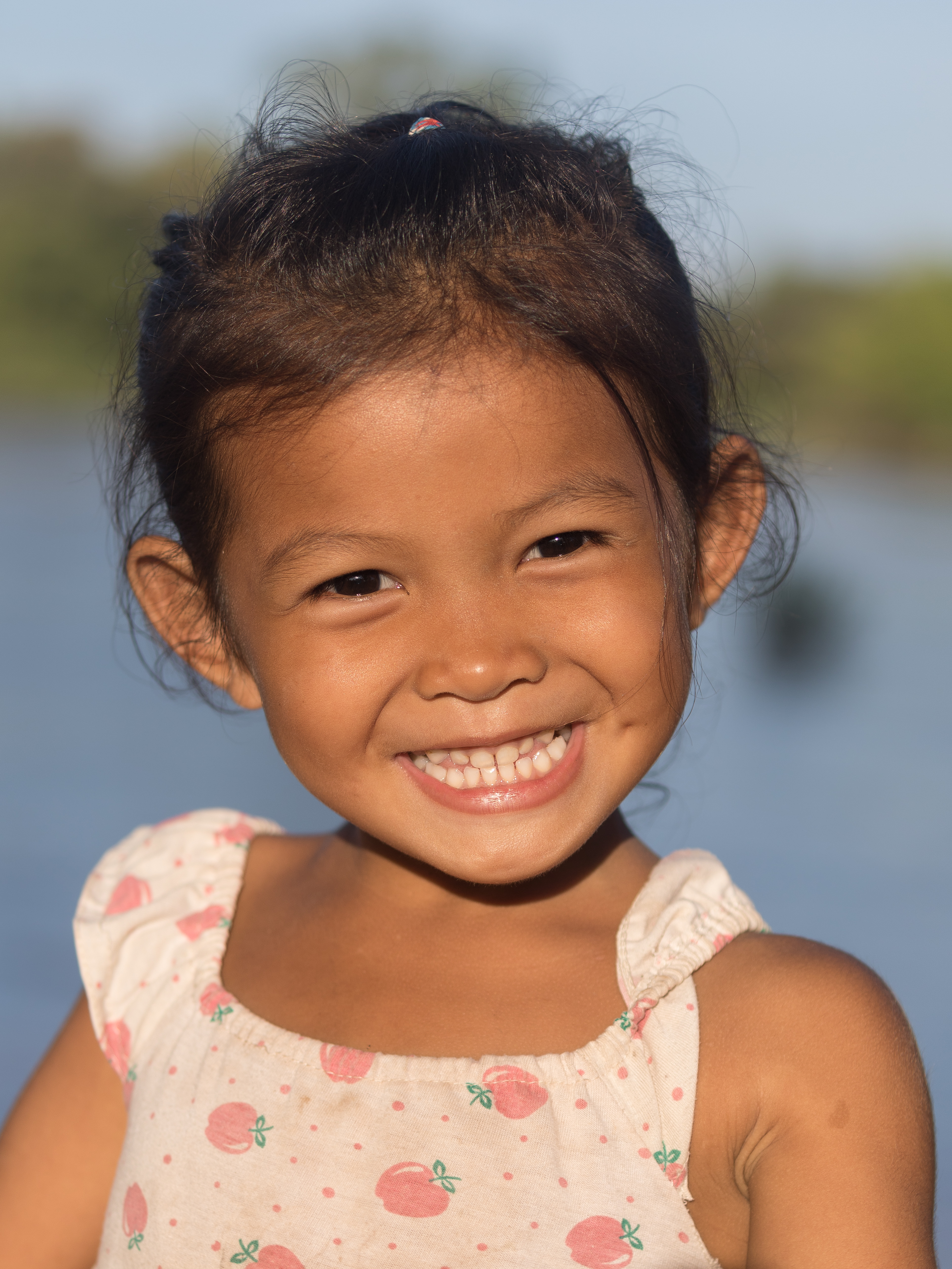
Don Det girl

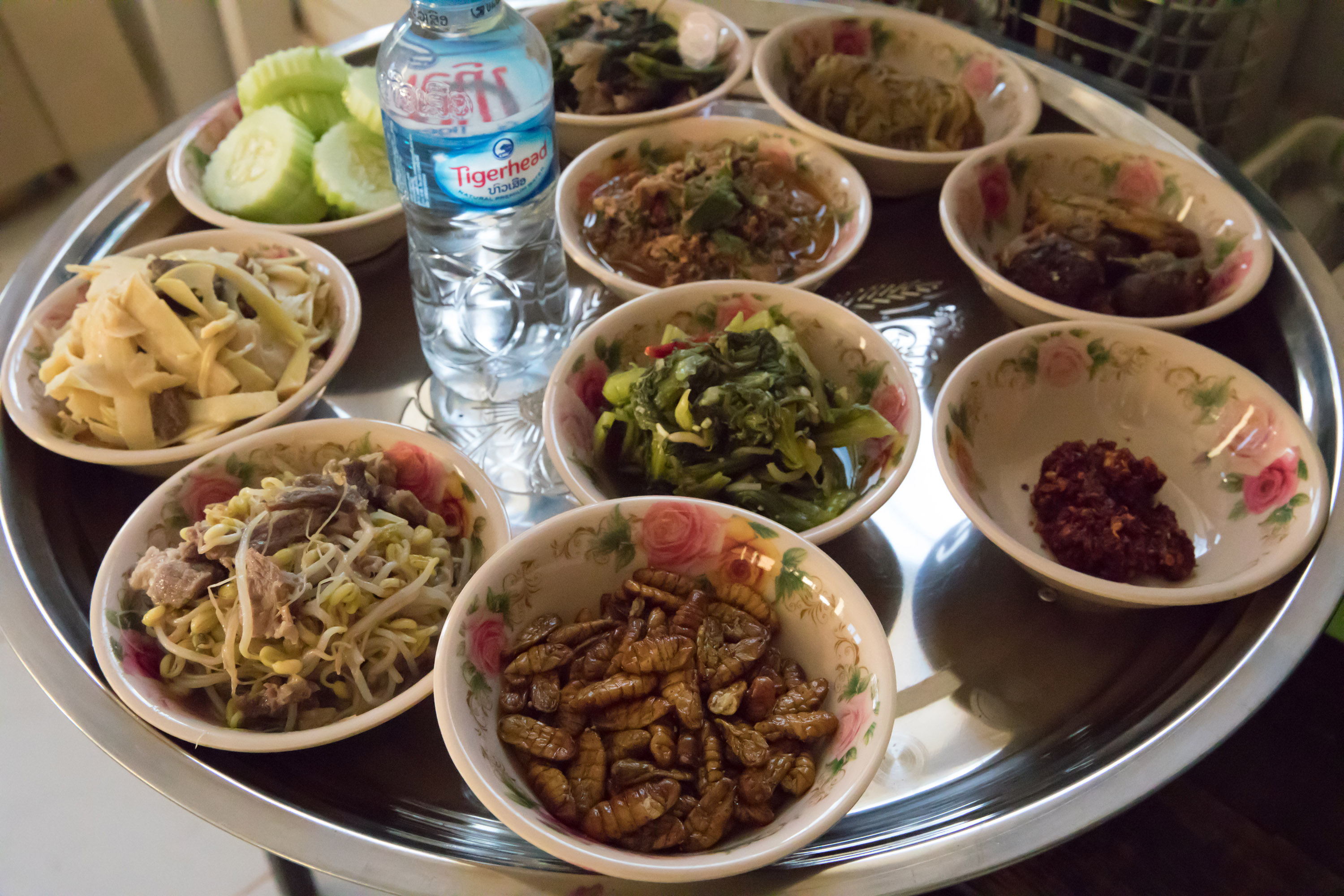
Local food.

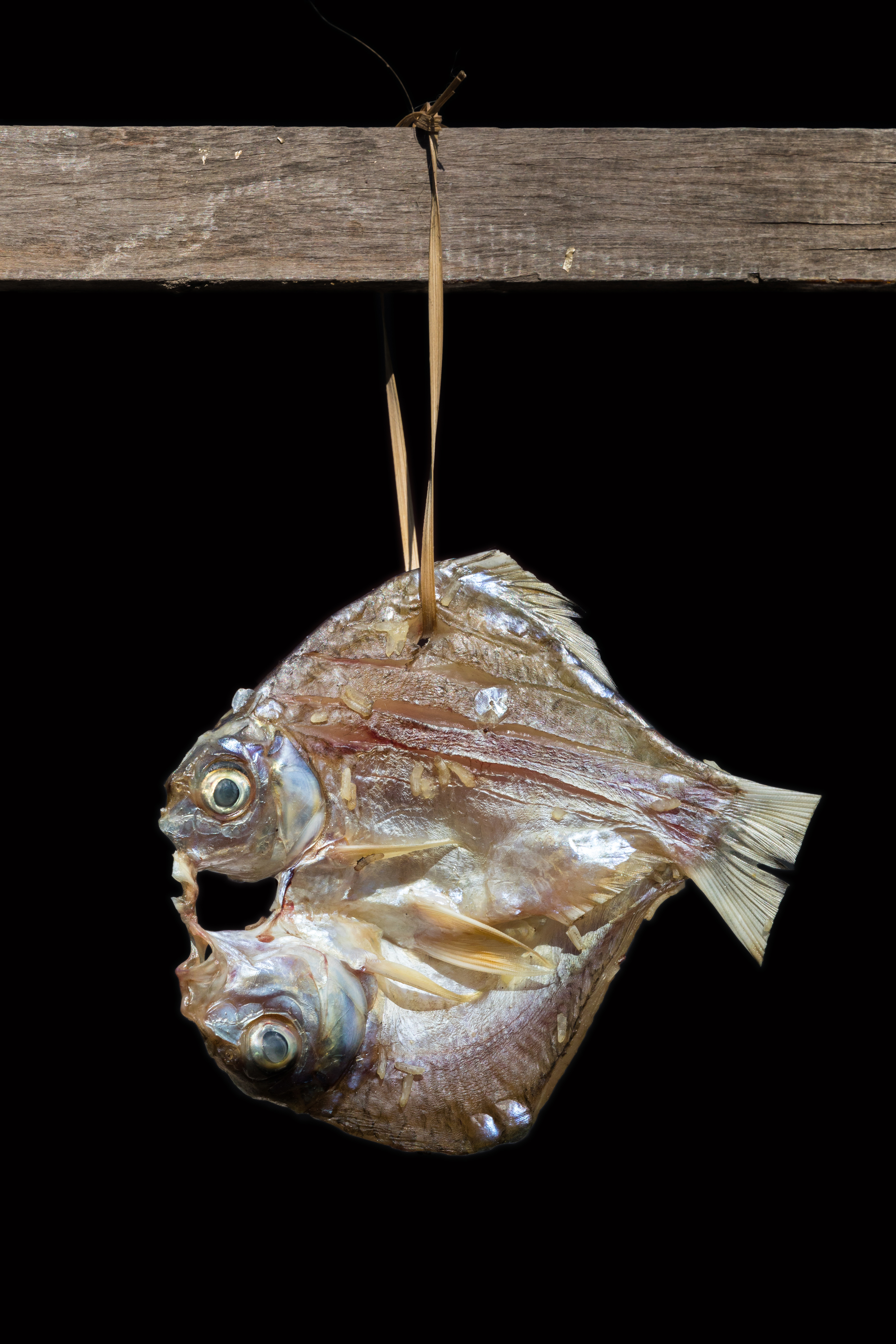
Mekong fish (pa tak or ປາຕາກ in Lao) hanging on a rack and drying in the sun, in Don Det.

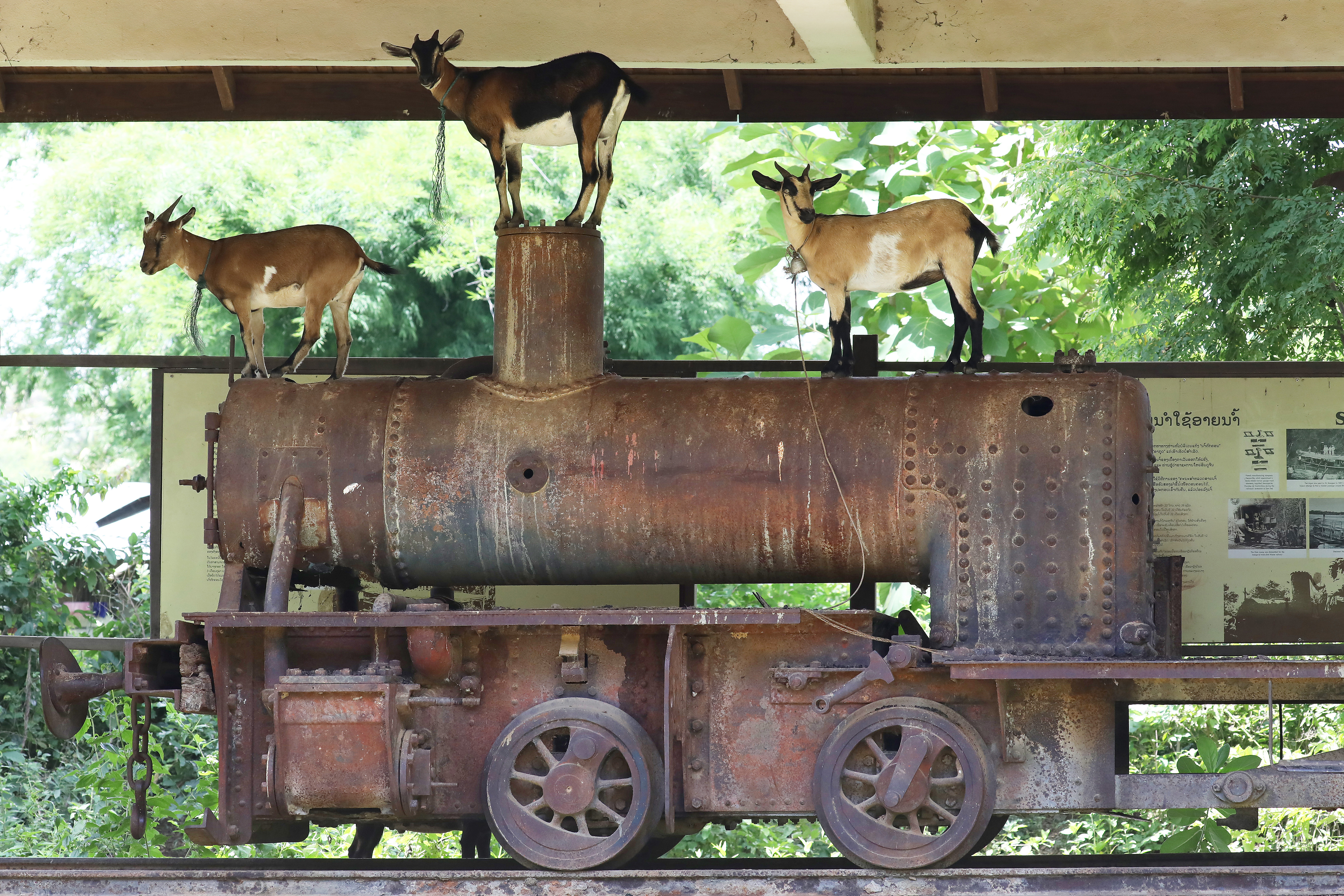
The locomotive is a historic object from the ancient Don Det–Don Khon narrow-gauge railway and constitutes a touristic place in Si Phan Don.
