= Dundubia spiculata =

Scientific classification
- Kingdom: Animalia
- Phylum: Arthropoda
- Class: Insecta
- Order: Hemiptera
- Suborder: Auchenorrhyncha
- Family: Cicadidae
- Subfamily: Cicadinae
- Tribe: Dundubiini
- Genus: Dundubia
- Species: D. spiculata

Binomial name
- Dundubia spiculata Noualhier, 1896

Synonyms
- Cosmopsaltria hastata Beuk, 1996; Dundubia siamensis Haupt, 1918; Dundubia speculata Hua, 2000; Platylomia spiculata

Species of true bug

Dundubia spiculata is a species of cicadas (Hemiptera: Cicadidae) in the tribe Dundubiini. The recorded distribution includes Indo-China and Peninsular Malaysia.

== Description ==
Describing Dundubia spiculata from Cambodian specimens, Noualhier stated that they are "Completely similar in shape, size and colour to D. mannifera Lin. [ambiguous synonym of Dundubia vaginata (Fabricius, 1787)], but distinct in shape of its metasternal opercula which are drawn back to a point or instead of being rounded; they are moreover widened after the basal constriction, which distinguishes it from D. intemerata Walk. [synonym of Dundubia rufivena Walker, F., 1850] in which these opercula are regularly attenuated by this constriction at the end."
