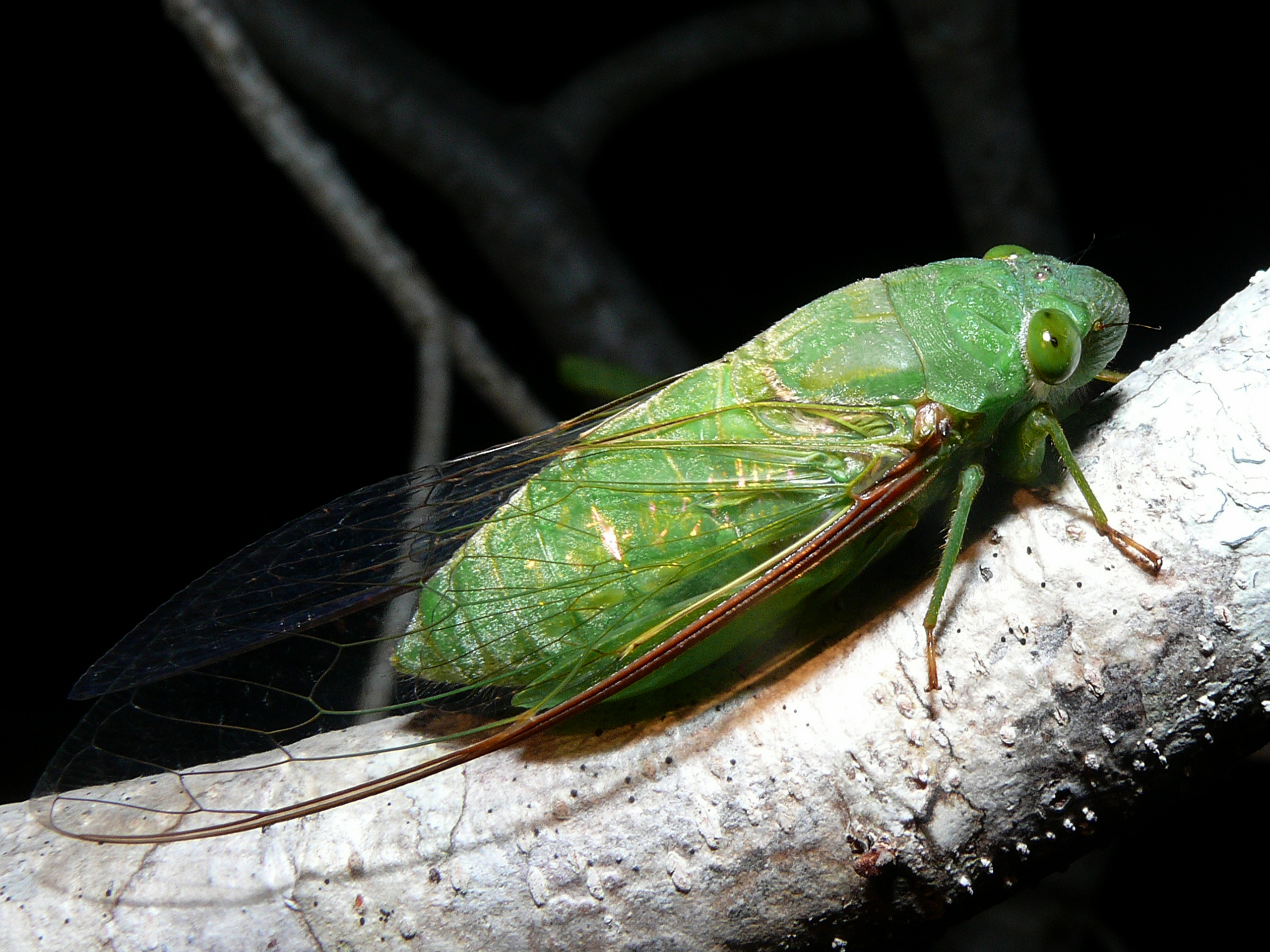
- Dundubia vaginata (Similajau National Park, Malaysia)

Scientific classification
- Kingdom: Animalia
- Phylum: Arthropoda
- Class: Insecta
- Order: Hemiptera
- Suborder: Auchenorrhyncha
- Family: Cicadidae
- Subfamily: Cicadinae
- Tribe: Dundubiini
- Genus: Dundubia
- Species: D. vaginata

Binomial name
- Dundubia vaginata Fabricius, 1787

Synonyms
- List: Tettigonia vaginata Fabricius, 1787 (basionym).; Cicada virescens Olivier, 1790; Cicada vaginata Olivier, 1790; Dundubia varians Walker, F., 1850; Dundubia immacula Walker, F., 1850; Dundubia sobria Walker, F., 1850; Cicada mannifera Walker, F., 1850; Dundubia mannifera Stål, 1866; Dundubia mannifera immacula Distant, 1889; Dundubia manifera Schmidt, E., 1920; Fidicina mannifera Weber, H., 1931; Dilobopyga gemina Duffels, 1977; Fidicina confinis Zaidi & Ruslan, 1997; Dundubia vaginat Zaidi, Nordin, Maryata, Wahab, Norashikin, Catherine & Fatimah, 2002; Cephaloxys mannifera Pham & Thinh, 2005; Mogannia mannifera Pham & Thinh, 2005

= Dundubia vaginata =

Species of true bug

Dundubia vaginata is the type species in its genus, sometimes called the jade-green cicada (Hemiptera: Cicadidae) in the tribe Dundubiini.

== Habitat and distribution ==
Dundubia vaginata is one of the most widespread species of the genus Dundubia and typically found in tropical forests. The recorded distribution is widespread throughout SE Asia: from India and China to Japan, Thailand, Malaysia, through to Sulawesi and northern Australia.

== Description ==
This species can have a uniform jade green colour throughout the body and has transparent wings. Its colour is actually very variable and the head, thorax and abdomen vary from ochre to green through brown.

Both pairs of wings are hyaline and may be slightly tinged with bronze. Males measure 35 to 45 mm and females 30 to 39 mm.

The front of the head is never black. The upper part of the clypeus is twice as wide at the base as the anterior lateral margins of the vertex. The rostrum passes the intermediate coxa, barely reaching the posterior coxa. The apex of the rostrum is black.

=== Description of the male ===
The opercula are spoon-shaped not curved laterally and its end is rounded; twice as long as wide and not strongly constricted. These opercula cover the tymbals, and reach the fifth to seventh abdominal segment. The mesonotum may sometimes have black lines. Head, thorax and abdomen are ochre or bright green. The uncus consists of two broad and obtuse lobes. The abdomen is uniform in colour without black spots.

=== Description of the female ===
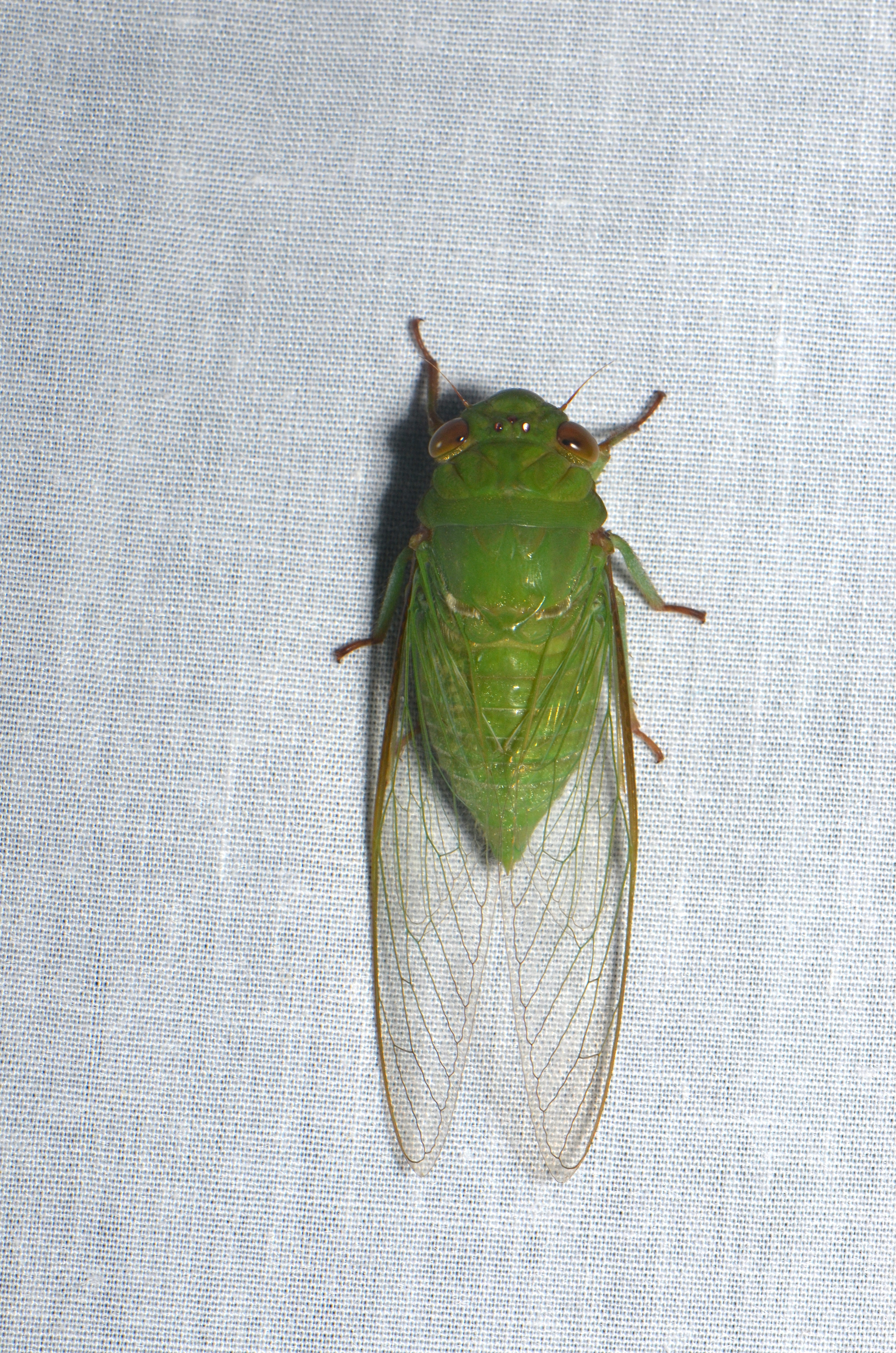
Dundubia vaginata female

The opercula do not have a lateral tooth. The mesonotum does not show black lines. The base of the abdomen is fairly pointed and slightly curved upwards. The lateral sides of the abdomen do not have black spots.

== Ecology ==
The life cycle of Dundubia vaginata is completed by the emergence of the imago, which lives for one to two months and is periodic.

Predators of the imago include: bats and Dicrurus paradiseus. Caecilians may feed on larvae.
