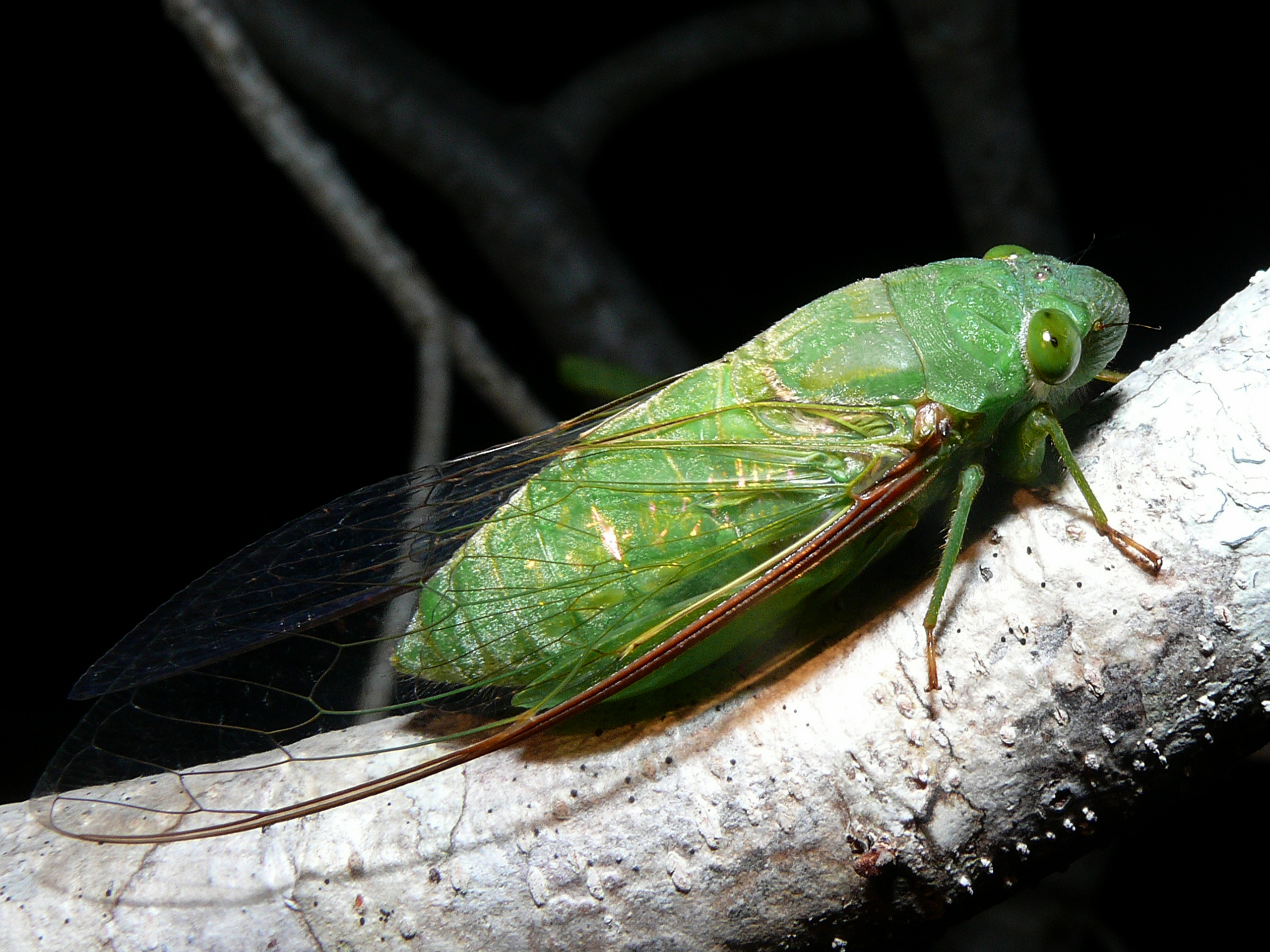
- Dundubia vaginata (Similajau National Park, Malaysia)

Scientific classification
- Domain: Eukaryota
- Kingdom: Animalia
- Phylum: Arthropoda
- Class: Insecta
- Order: Hemiptera
- Suborder: Auchenorrhyncha
- Family: Cicadidae
- Subfamily: Cicadinae
- Tribe: Dundubiini
- Genus: Dundubia; Amyot & Audinet-Serville, 1843

= Dundubia =

Genus of true bugs

Dundubia is a genus of cicadas (Hemiptera: Cicadidae) in the subfamily Cicadinae and the type genus of the tribe Dundubiini.

The name Dundubia is derived from Sanskrit दुंदुभि (dundubhi), meaning 'drum'. A characteristic feature is the pair of long lobes covering the tymbals on the underside of the male abdomen.

== Description ==
The head is triangular with a prominent large forewing margin and a forehead with a short longitudinal groove in the middle. The fairly prominent eyes, are large and oval. The prothorax is not expanded at the sides.

This genus is notable for the extraordinarily large opercula covering the tymbals and extending down much the abdomen in male insects.

== Species ==
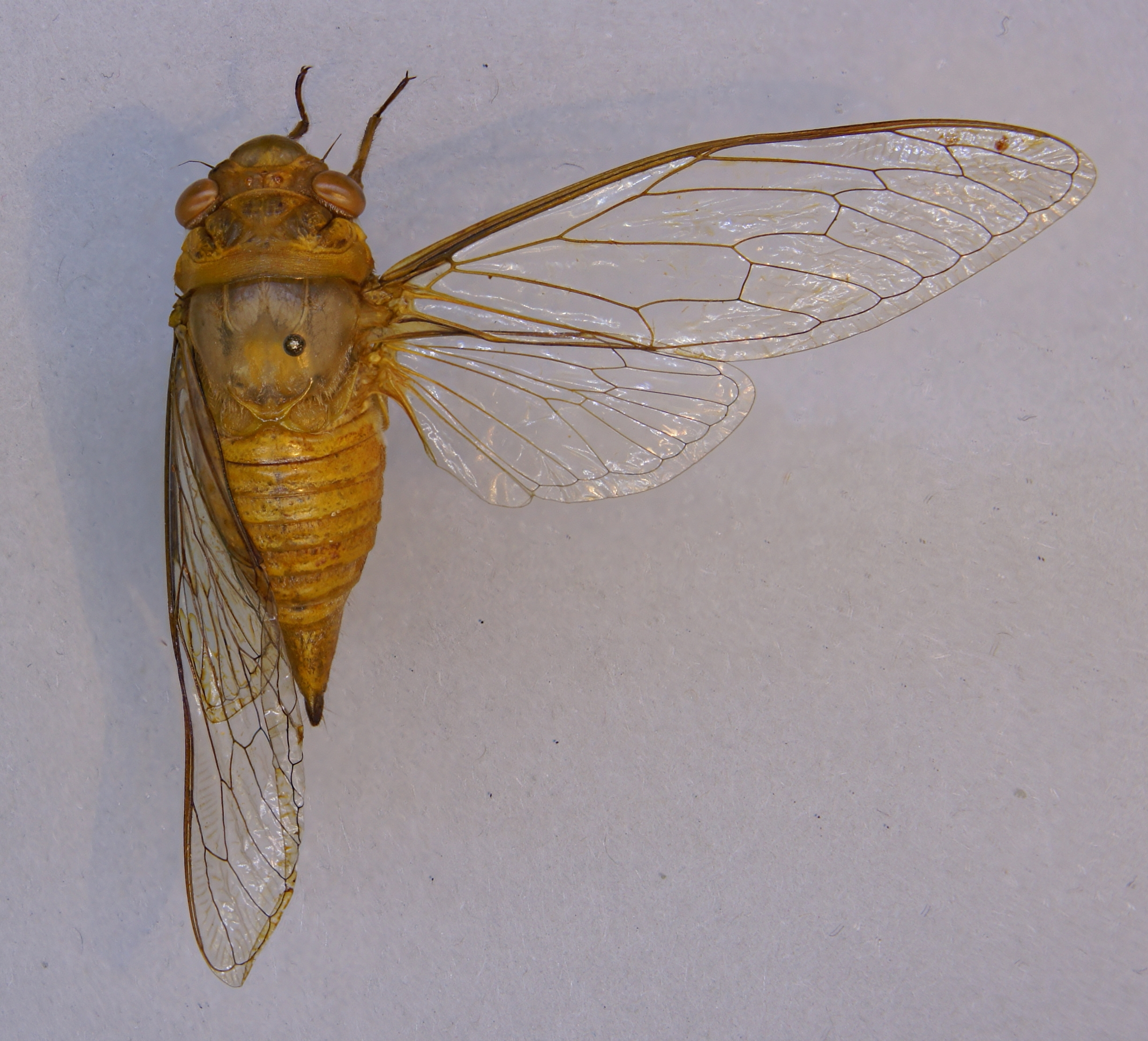
D. euterpe (western Sumatra)

The Global Biodiversity Information Facility lists:

- Dundubia andamansidensis (Boulard, 2001)
- Dundubia annandalei Boulard, 2007
- Dundubia ayutthaya Beuk, 1996
- Dundubia cochlearata Overmeer & Duffels, 1967
- Dundubia crepitans Boulard, 2005
- Dundubia dubia Lee, 2009
- Dundubia emanatura Distant, 1889
- Dundubia ensifera Bloem & Duffels, 1976
- Dundubia euterpe Bloem & Duffels, 1976
- Dundubia feae (Distant, 1892)
- Dundubia flava Lee, 2009
- Dundubia gravesteini Duffels, 1976
- Dundubia hainanensis (Distant, 1901)
- Dundubia hastata (Moulton, J.C., 1923)
- Dundubia jacoona (Distant, 1888)
- Dundubia kebuna Moulton, J.C., 1923
- Dundubia laterocurvata Beuk, 1996
- Dundubia myitkyinensis Beuk, 1996
- Dundubia nagarasingna Distant, 1881
- Dundubia nigripes (Moulton, J.C., 1923)
- Dundubia nigripesoides Boulard, 2008
- Dundubia oopaga (Distant, 1881)
- Dundubia rafflesii Distant, 1883
- Dundubia rhamphodes Bloem & Duffels, 1976
- Dundubia rufivena Walker, F., 1850
- Dundubia simalurensis Overmeer & Duffels, 1967
- Dundubia sinbyudaw Beuk, 1996
- Dundubia solokensis Overmeer & Duffels, 1967
- Dundubia somraji Boulard, 2003
- Dundubia spiculata Noualhier, 1896
- Dundubia terpsichore (Walker, F., 1850)
- Dundubia vaginata (Fabricius, 1787) - type species (as Tettigonia vaginata Fabricius, 1787)
- Dundubia vanna Chou, Lei, Li, Lu & Yao, 1997
