= Rural economics =

Study of village economies

Rural economics is the study of rural economies. Rural economies include both agricultural and non-agricultural industries, so rural economics has broader concerns than agricultural economics which focus more on food systems. Rural development and finance attempt to solve larger challenges within rural economics. These economic issues are often connected to the migration from rural areas due to lack of economic activities and rural poverty. Some interventions have been very successful in some parts of the world, with rural electrification and rural tourism providing anchors for transforming economies in some rural areas. These challenges often create rural-urban income disparities.

Rural spaces add new challenges for economic analysis that require an understanding of economic geography: for example understanding of size and spatial distribution of production and household units and interregional trade, land use, and how low population density effects government policies as to development, investment, regulation, and transportation.

Rural economics conceptualizes rural areas not as mere appendages of agriculture but as complex economic systems in which production, everyday life, community, ecosystems, services, and settlement patterns are integrated. It often uses a triangular framework of economy, society, and space as a core analytical lens that runs through the discipline. The economic dimension encompasses a multi‑layered industrial ecosystem that extends beyond agriculture to include rural manufacturing, tourism, renewable energy, bio‑industries, and the digital economy. The social dimension covers demographic change, household economies, labor markets, cooperatives, social farming, and care economies that sustain rural social reproduction. The spatial dimension focuses on land use, living and social infrastructure, settlement systems, financial systems, and digital infrastructure as the physical and institutional arenas in which rural economic activity unfolds, and on the disparities within these arenas. Rural economics aims to elucidate how these three dimensions constrain and reinforce one another through their dynamic interactions.

Rural economics takes as its disciplinary mandate the diagnosis of the structural crises confronting rural areas, the re-examination of the multifunctional value of the countryside, and the design of a sustainable rural economic model. Such tasks can be fully accomplished only by broadening the theoretical foundation through interdisciplinary convergence with adjacent fields—agricultural economics, regional economics, social economics, and spatial economics—and must ultimately culminate in the establishment of an independent body of theory that reflects historical experience and concrete conditions.

The Fundamental Problematic of Rural Economics: Why, and How, Does the Countryside Persist?

The fundamental problematic running through rural economics is not merely whether the countryside is in crisis, but rather a civilizational question: How has the countryside come to exist? What sustains it? And how will it endure and transform in the future? Rural areas continuously lose population, undergo industrial change, and experience the contraction of services; yet at the same time they have maintained a distinctive resilience grounded in relational economy, community capital, ecology, landscape, food, and culture. To clarify the mechanisms of this persistence is the core problematic of rural economics, and it calls for a meta-economic approach in which economy, society, space, and civilization are conjoined. Rural economics begins from the vision that it must be established not as a discipline of agriculture but as a civilizational economics that undergirds the future of the nation and of humanity. (Source: *Rural Economics*, Choi Mun-sik and Lee So-jin, 2026)

== Issues ==
=== Rural development ===
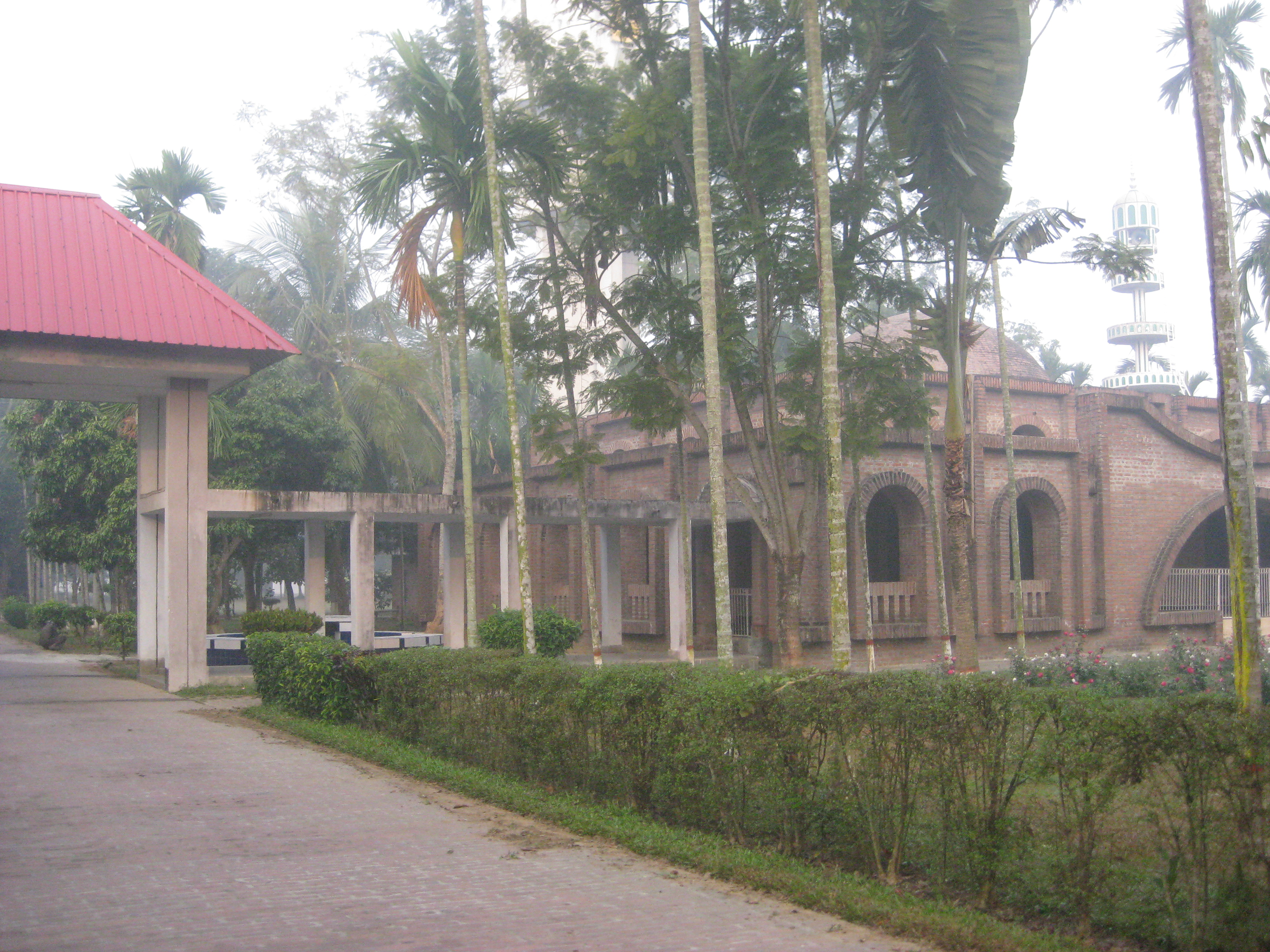
A rural development academy in Bogra, Bangladesh. Many government and non-governmental agencies invest in capacity building and opportunities for rural communities to gain greater access to economic opportunities.

Rural development is the process of improving the quality of life and economic well-being of people living in rural areas, often relatively isolated and sparsely populated areas. Often, rural regions have experienced rural poverty, poverty greater than urban or suburban economic regions due to lack of access to economic activities, and lack of investments in key infrastructure such as education.

Rural development has traditionally centered on the exploitation of land-intensive natural resources such as agriculture and forestry. However, changes in global production networks and increased urbanization have changed the character of rural areas. Increasingly rural tourism, niche manufacturers, and recreation have replaced resource extraction and agriculture as dominant economic drivers. The need for rural communities to approach development from a wider perspective has created more focus on a broad range of development goals rather than merely creating incentive for agricultural or resource-based businesses.

Education, entrepreneurship, physical infrastructure, and social infrastructure all play an important role in developing rural regions. Rural development is also characterized by its emphasis on locally produced economic development strategies. In contrast to urban regions, which have many similarities, rural areas are highly distinctive from one another. For this reason there are a large variety of rural development approaches used globally.

=== Electrification ===
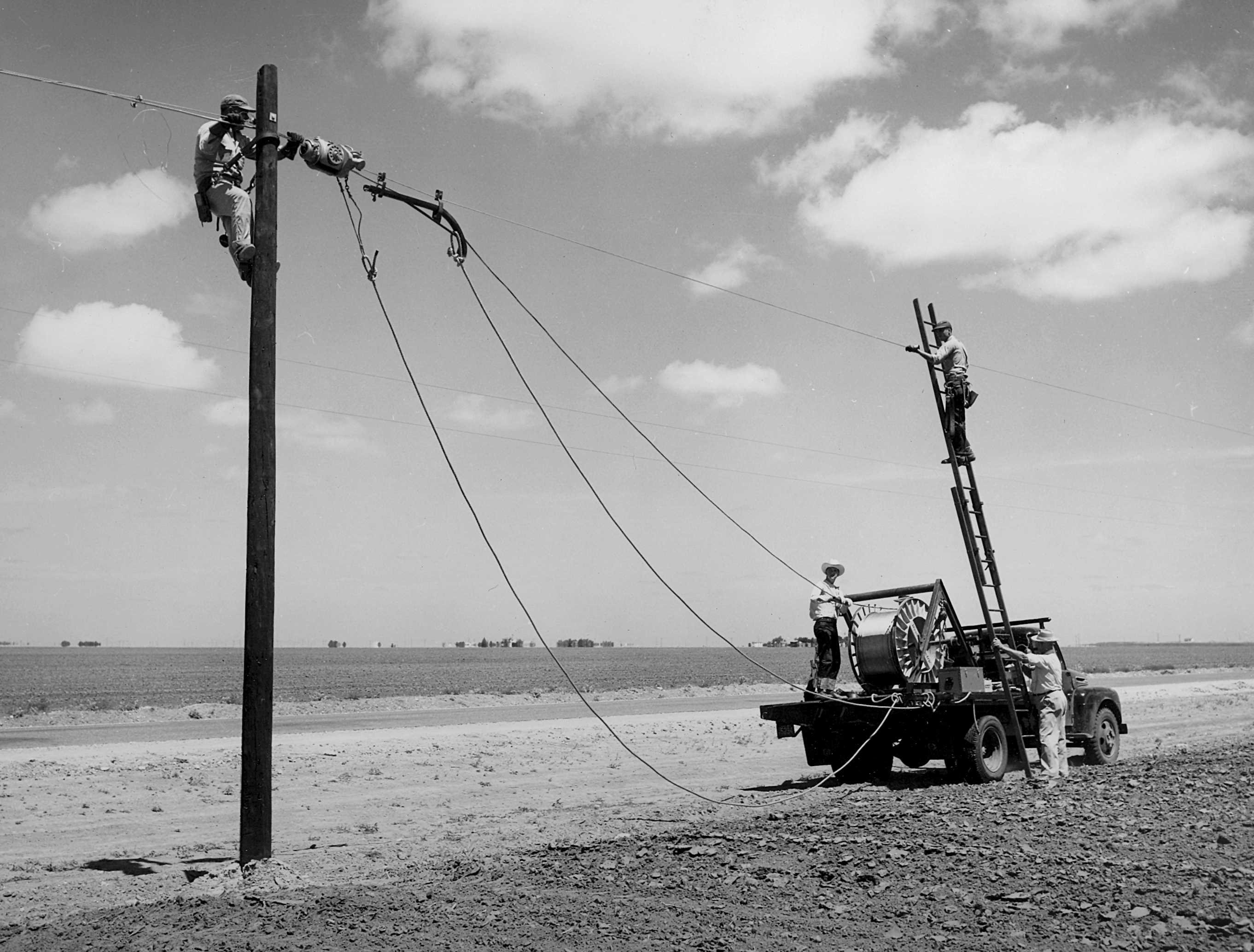
Construction of rural power distribution lines in the United States, funded by the Rural Electrification Administration

Share of the population with access to electricity

Rural electrification is the process of bringing electrical power to rural and remote areas. Rural communities are suffering from colossal market failures as the national grids fall short of their demand for electricity. As of 2019, 770 million people live without access to electricity – 10.2% of the global population. Electrification typically begins in cities and towns and gradually extends to rural areas, however, this process often runs into obstacles in developing nations. Expanding the national grid is expensive and countries consistently lack the capital to grow their current infrastructure. Additionally, amortizing capital costs to reduce the unit cost of each hook-up is harder to do in lightly populated areas (yielding higher per capita share of the expense). If countries are able to overcome these obstacles and reach nationwide electrification, rural communities will be able to reap considerable amounts of economic and social development.

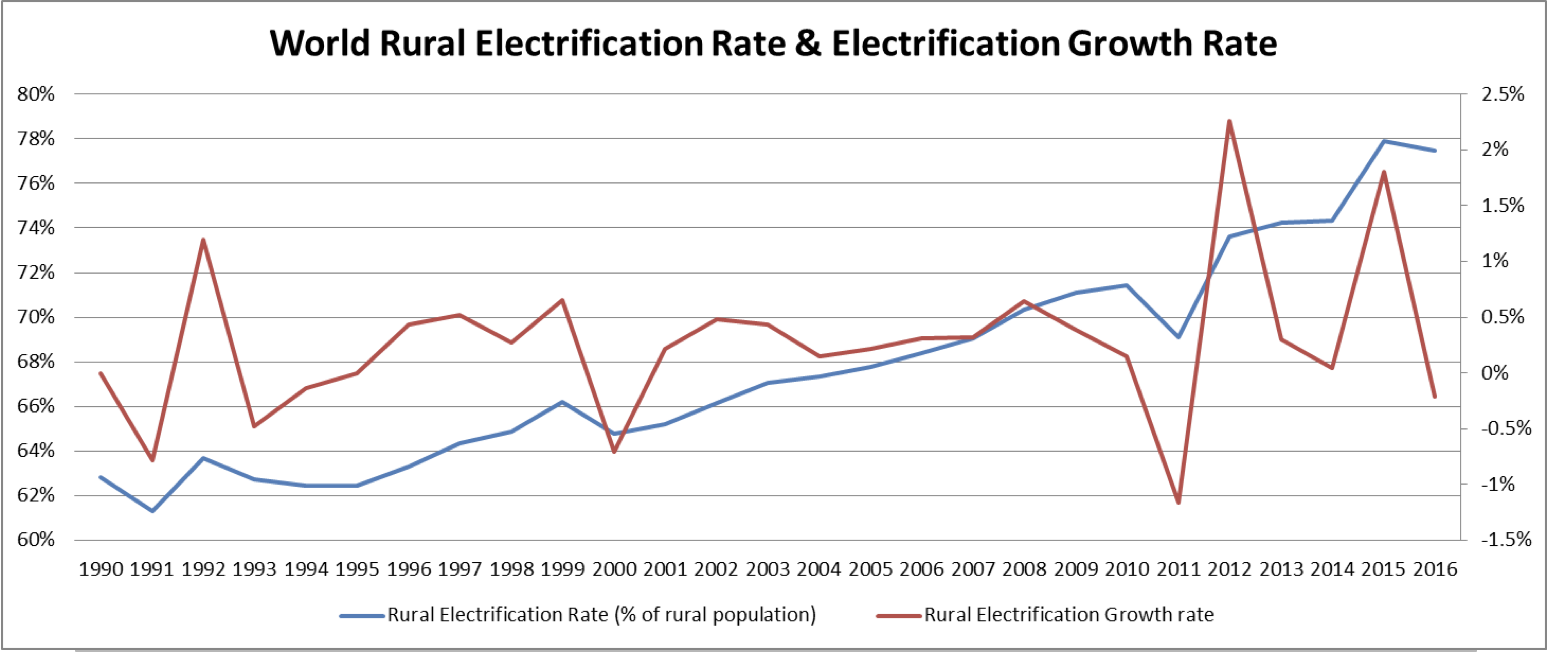
This graph shows the world rural electrification rate along with the electrification growth rate 1990–2016 and synthesizes data from the World Bank.

=== Rural flight ===
Urban vs rural majority

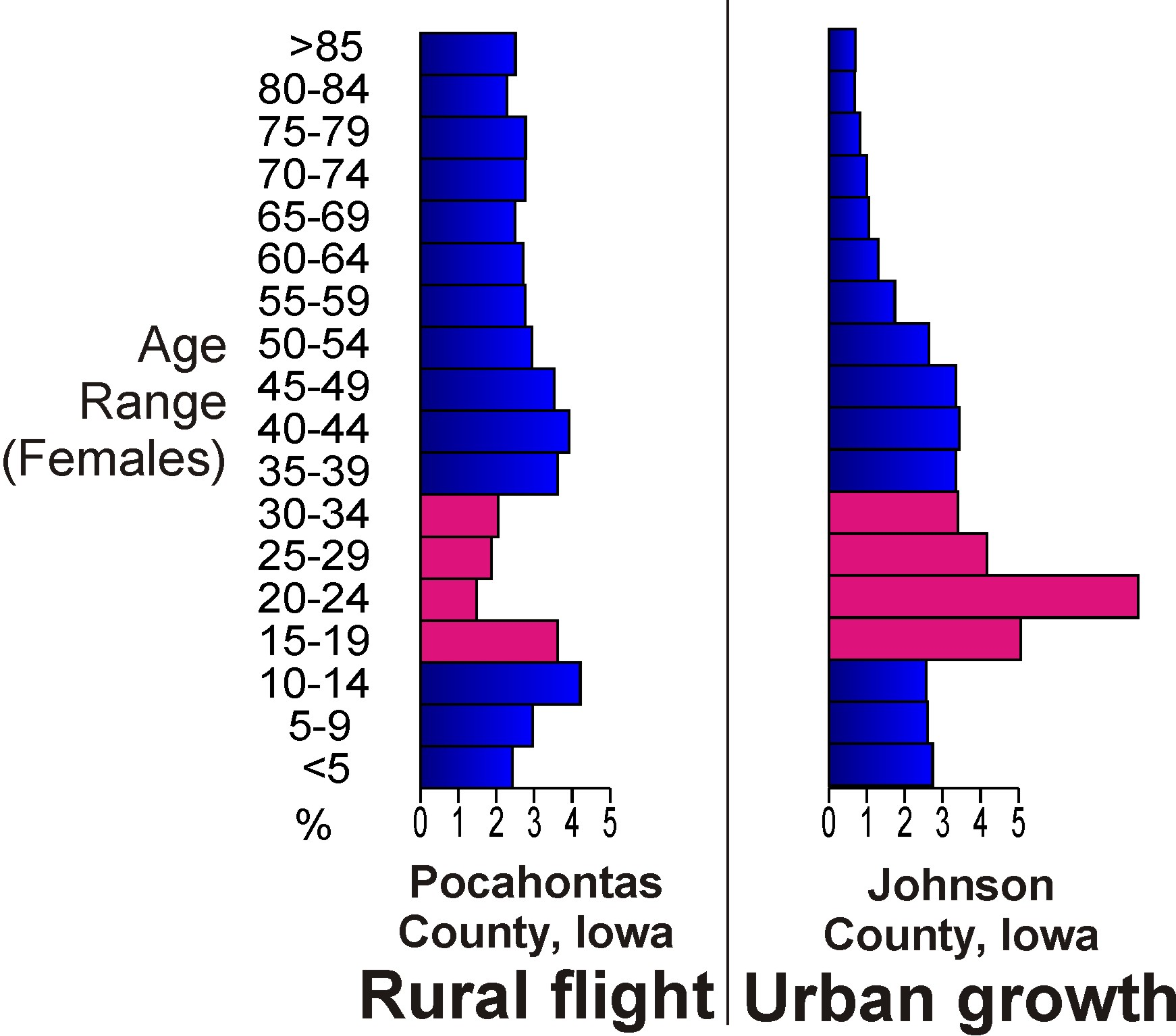
Population age comparison between rural Pocahontas County, Iowa, and urban Johnson County, Iowa, illustrating the flight of young female adults (red) to urban centers in Iowa

Rural flight (also known as rural-to-urban migration, rural depopulation, or rural exodus) is the migratory pattern of people from rural areas into urban areas. It is urbanization seen from the rural perspective. The pattern arises from an interplay of various push and pull factors and has occurred across history pushing states to employ multiple strategies to deal with the social and economic ramifications.

In industrializing economies like Britain in the eighteenth century or East Asia in the twentieth century, it can occur following the industrialization of primary industries such as agriculture, mining, fishing, and forestry—when fewer people are needed to bring the same amount of output to market—and related secondary industries (refining and processing) are consolidated. Rural exodus can also follow an ecological or human-caused catastrophe such as a famine or resource depletion. These are examples of push factors.

People can also move into town to seek higher wages, educational access and other urban amenities; examples of pull factors.

Once rural populations fall below a critical mass, the population is too small to support certain businesses, which then also leave or close, in a vicious circle. Services to smaller and more dispersed populations may be proportionately more expensive, which can lead to closures of offices and services, which further harm the rural economy. Schools are the archetypal example because they influence the decisions of parents of young children: a village or region without a school will typically lose families to larger towns that have one. But the concept (urban hierarchy) can be applied more generally to many services and is explained by central place theory.

Government policies to combat rural flight include campaigns to expand services to the countryside, such as electrification or distance education. Governments can also use restrictions like internal passports to make rural flight illegal. Economic conditions that can counter rural depopulation include commodities booms, the expansion of outdoor-focused tourism, and a shift to remote work, or exurbanization. To some extent, governments generally seek only to manage rural flight and channel it into certain cities, rather than stop it outright as this would imply taking on the expensive task of building airports, railways, hospitals, and universities in places with few users to support them, while neglecting growing urban and suburban areas.

In the 21st century states have adopted other strategies to counter this depopulation. They include Japan's akiya programs, Ireland’s refurbishment grants for island housing, and Greece’s relocation stipends in order to repopulate said regions. Others used migration (Canada’s Rural Community Immigration Pilot) which matched rural employers facing labor shortages with immigrants. Similarly, Romania also assists with housing and language learning.

=== Rural poverty ===
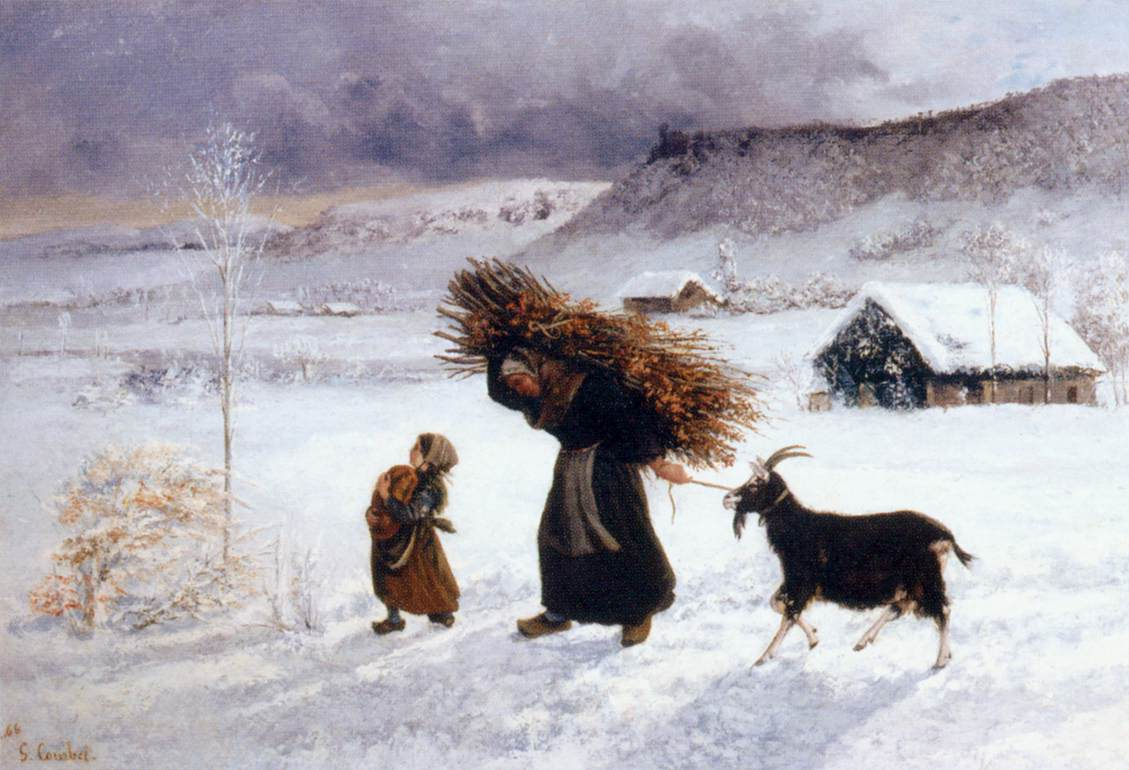
Gustave Courbet depicted nineteenth century rural poverty in this painting.

Rural poverty refers to situations where people living in non-urban regions are in a state or condition of lacking the financial resources and essentials for living. It takes account of factors of rural society, rural economy, and political systems that give rise to the marginalization and economic disadvantage found there. Rural areas, because of their small, spread-out populations, typically have less well maintained infrastructure and a harder time accessing markets, which tend to be concentrated in population centers.

Rural communities also face disadvantages in terms of legal and social protections, with women and marginalized communities frequently having a harder time accessing land, education and other support systems that help with economic development. Several policies have been tested in both developing and developed economies, including rural electrification and access to other technologies such as internet, gender parity, and improved access to credit and income.

In academic studies, rural poverty is often discussed in conjunction with spatial inequality, which in this context refers to the inequality between urban and rural areas. Both rural poverty and spatial inequality are global phenomena, but like poverty in general, there are higher rates of rural poverty in developing countries than in developed countries.

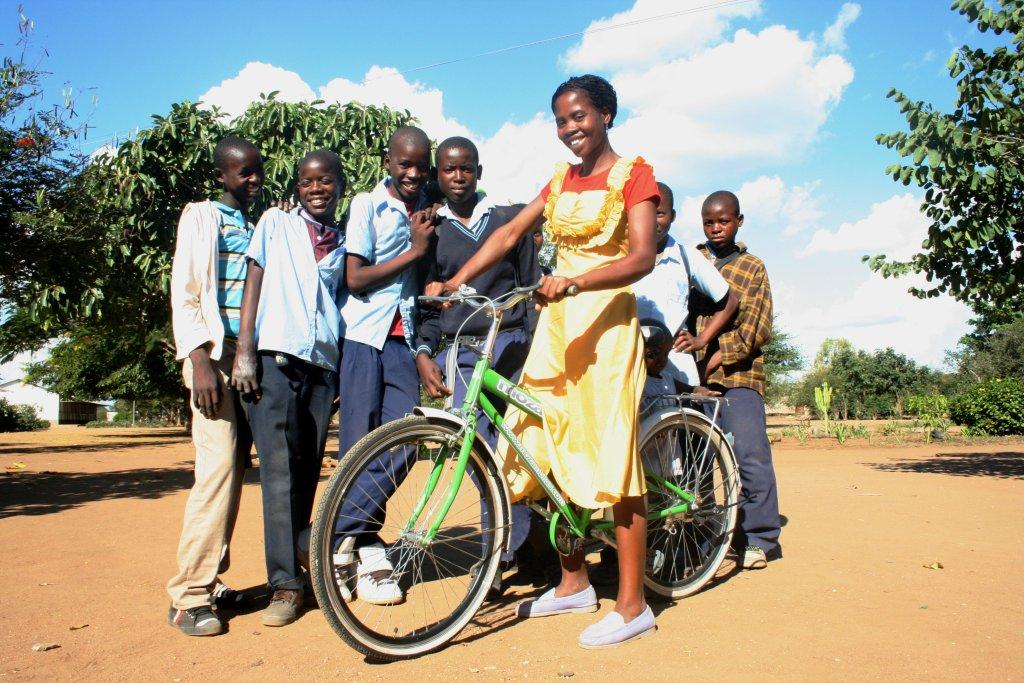
Many parts of rural Africa, such as this community in Mozambique, experience rural poverty. This woman was given access to a bicycle through a rural development program through a Bicycle poverty reduction program. Access to affordable transportation has been a key part of gaining access to greater economic mobility in many parts of the world. For example, distributing bicycles was one of the key strategies used by China to reduce rural poverty in the 20th century.

Eradicating rural poverty through effective policies and economic growth is a continuing difficulty for the international community, as it invests in rural development. According to the International Fund for Agricultural Development, 70 percent of the people in extreme poverty are in rural areas, most of whom are smallholders or agricultural workers whose livelihoods are heavily dependent on agriculture. These food systems are vulnerable to extreme weather, which is expected to affect agricultural systems the world over more as climate change increases.

Thus the climate crisis is expected to reduce the effectiveness of programs reducing rural poverty and cause displacement of rural communities to urban centers. Sustainable Development Goal 1: No Poverty sets international goals to address these issues, and is deeply connected with investments in a sustainable food system as part of Sustainable Development Goal 2: Zero Hunger.

== Important sectors ==
=== Agriculture ===
Agricultural economics is an applied field of economics concerned with the application of economic theory in optimizing the production and distribution of food and fiber products. Agricultural economics began as a branch of economics that specifically dealt with land usage. It focused on maximizing the crop yield while maintaining a good soil ecosystem. Throughout the 20th century the discipline expanded and the current scope of the discipline is much broader. Agricultural economics today includes a variety of applied areas, having considerable overlap with conventional economics. Agricultural economists have made substantial contributions to research in economics, econometrics, development economics, and environmental economics. Agricultural economics influences food policy, agricultural policy, and environmental policy.

=== Peasantry ===
Peasant economics is an area of economics in which a wide variety of economic approaches ranging from the neoclassical to the Marxist are used to examine the political economy of the peasantry. The defining feature of the peasants are that they are typically seen to be only partly integrated into the market economy -— an economy which, in societies with a significant peasant population, is typically found to have many imperfect, incomplete or missing markets. Peasant economics treats peasants as something different from other farmers as they are not assumed to be simply small profit maximizing farmers; by contrast, peasant economics covers a wide range of different theories of peasant household behavior. These include various assumptions about the maximization of profits, risk aversion, drudgery aversion, and sharecropping. The assumptions, logic, and predictions of these theories are examined and the impact of subsistence is typically found to have important implications in terms of producers decisions about supply, consumption and price. Chayanov was an early proponent of the importance of understanding peasant behaviour arguing that peasants would work as hard as they needed in order to meet their subsistence needs, but had no incentive beyond those needs and therefore would slow and stop working once they were met. This principle, the consumption-labour-balance principle, implies that the peasant household will increase its work until it meets (balances) the needs (consumption) of the household. A possible implication of this view of peasant societies is that they will not develop without some external, added factor. Peasant economics has been seen as being an important area of study by some development economists, agricultural sociologists, and anthropologists.

=== Tourism ===
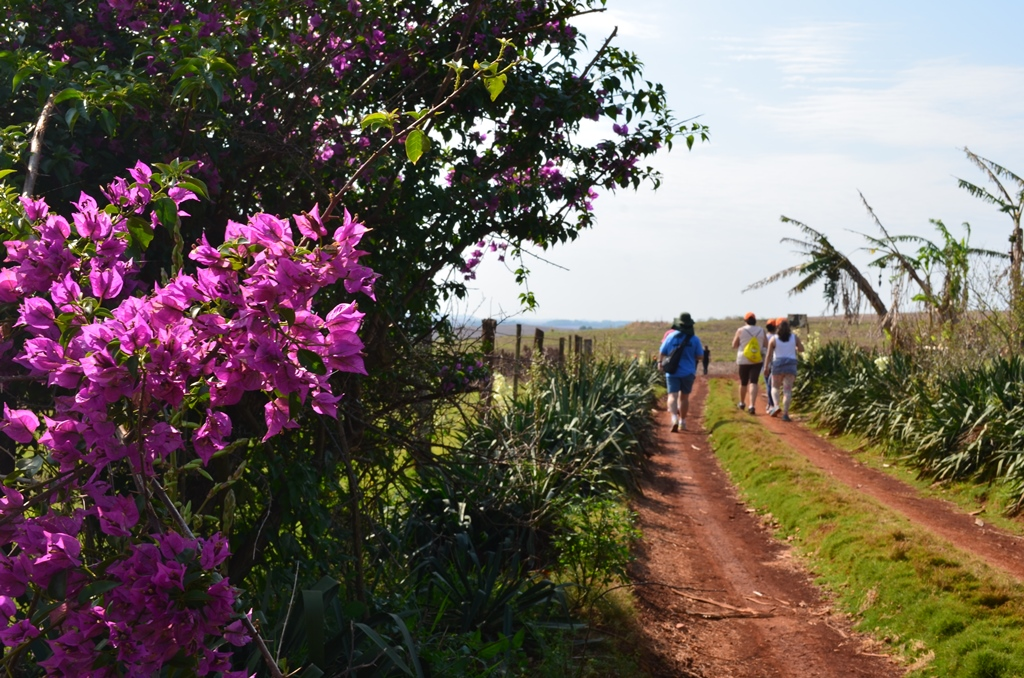
Tourists visiting a rural area in Paraná, Brazil

Rural tourism is a form of tourism that focuses on actively participating in a rural lifestyle. Activities in rural tourism often promote local agricultural or fishing practices, art, culture, heritage, and other aspects of local life. It can be a variant of ecotourism, which engages tourists with the local environment, often focusing on sustainable practices, conservation management and environmental education.

Rural tourism activities contribute to rural community development by providing economic benefits, creating new employment opportunities for local residents, supporting local businesses and providing revenue for the government. In developed nations, rural tourism can play a significant role in local economies. In the United States, niche tourism programs such as wine tours, agritourism, and seasonal events are prominent in rural areas.

Global rural tourism organizations showcase an existing interest among tourists to visit rural areas and experience the rural lifestyle. World Wide Opportunities on Organic Farms (WWOOF) is a global organization that promotes sustainable agriculture. It connects volunteers with organic farms, providing them with opportunities to live on site and learn about sustainable farming practices.

Community-based ecotourism (CBE) is a model that requires community involvement, prioritizing collaboration with local communities during the planning process and active management of ecotourism sites. Organizations like TIES promote sustainable practices that benefit both hosts and tourists.

== See also ==
- Agricultural economics
- Agroecology
- Economic development
- Economic geography
- Electrical energy efficiency on United States farms
- Peasant economics
- Regional economics
- RIGA Project
- Rural development
- Rural sociology
- Urban economics
