= Riga (disambiguation) =

Riga is the capital of Latvia.

Riga may also refer to:

== Geography ==
- Free City of Riga, a city-state which was annexed by the Polish-Lithuanian Commonwealth in 1582
- Riga Governorate, a governorate of the Russian Empire
  - Riga county, within the governorate, dissolved in 1949
- Riga district, Latvia
- Riga, New York, United States, a town
- Riga Township, Michigan, United States, a township
- Riga Assembly constituency, Bihar, India
- Riga (Saeima constituency), a constituency of the national legislature of Latvia
- Archdiocese of Riga, Latvia, a Roman Catholic archdiocese
- Archbishopric of Riga, Latvia, a medieval Roman Catholic archbishopric
- Archbishopric of Riga, an Evangelical Lutheran Church of Latvia archbishopric

== People ==
- Riga (surname)
- Riga Mustapha (born 1981), Ghanaian former footballer

== Latvian sports ==
=== Association football ===
- Riga FC, a Latvian football club founded in 2014
- FK Rīga (1999–2008), a defunct Latvian football club
- FK VEF Rīga (1945–1994), a defunct Latvian football club
- Riga Vanderer (1927–1940, 1941–1944), a defunct Latvian football club
- RFK Riga (1923–1944), a defunct Latvian football club
- Union Riga (1907–1939), a defunct Latvian football club
- SFK Rīga (2021–2024), a defunct Latvian women's football club based in Riga, Latvia

=== Basketball ===
- BK VEF Rīga, a Latvian basketball team
- TTT Riga, a professional women's basketball club based in Riga, Latvia
- ASK Riga, a defunct professional basketball club

=== Ice hockey and bandy ===
- HK Riga 2000, a Latvian ice hockey team
- HS Rīga, a Latvian ice hockey team
- ODO Riga, a defunct sports club formed in 1950, with teams in bandy and ice hockey

== Transportation ==
- Riga International Airport, Riga, Latvia
- Riga Central Station, the main railway station in Riga, Latvia
- Riga International Coach Terminal, a bus station in Riga, Latvia
- Riga-class frigate, a 1950s Soviet Navy class of frigates
- SS Riga, a number of ships with this name
- Riga (moped), a Latvian moped produced between 1965 and 1992

== Other uses ==
- 1796 Riga, an asteroid
- RIGA Project, a United Nations project
- Riga Technical University, Riga, Latvia
- Riga Academy, Riga, New York, United States, a former school, now a residential house on the National Register of Historic Places
- Riga Black Balsam, an alcoholic drink in Latvia

== See also ==
- Gulf of Riga, Baltic Sea
- Riga Cathedral, a church in Riga, Latvia
- Riga Castle, a building in Riga, Latvia
- Mount Riga (NYCRR station), a former train station
