= Peasant economics =

Peasant economics is an area of economics in which a wide variety of economic approaches ranging from the neoclassical to the Marxist are used to examine the political economy of the peasantry. The defining feature of the peasants are that they are typically seen to be only partly integrated into the market economy -— an economy which, in societies with a significant peasant population, is typically found to have many imperfect, incomplete or missing markets. Peasant economics treats peasants as something different from other farmers as they are not assumed to be simply small profit maximizing farmers; by contrast, peasant economics covers a wide range of different theories of peasant household behavior. These include various assumptions about the maximization of profits, risk aversion, drudgery aversion, and sharecropping. The assumptions, logic, and predictions of these theories are examined and the impact of subsistence is typically found to have important implications in terms of producers decisions about supply, consumption and price. Chayanov was an early proponent of the importance of understanding peasant behaviour arguing that peasants would work as hard as they needed in order to meet their subsistence needs, but had no incentive beyond those needs and therefore would slow and stop working once they were met. This principle, the consumption-labour-balance principle, implies that the peasant household will increase its work until it meets (balances) the needs (consumption) of the household. A possible implication of this view of peasant societies is that they will not develop without some external, added factor. Peasant economics has been seen as being an important area of study by some development economists, agricultural sociologists, and anthropologists.

== Peasant society ==
The economist George Dalton, through surveying agrarian peasant economies in areas of West Africa, suggests that in societies where peasant economics is the predominant form of production, those societies generally consist of a community of family units. Dalton defines this community as "a circle of people who live together… so that they share not this or that particular interest, but a whole set of interests wide enough and comprehensive enough to include their lives." These communities largely produce for their own subsistence, as opposed to producing for markets. The production processes that occur in these societies center around this subsistence, and the organization of this society into a communal form of production. As Dalton writes of African peasant communities, unemployment and economic depression are not the main issues. Instead, these societies primarily have to contend with issues within the environment, like the weather and plant diseases. Peasants are also less likely to be specialists in a particular area of production and will spend time across the year doing a wide range of productive activities. Dalton also argued that peasant societies based their economic production much more on cultural and religious tradition, as opposed to purely environmental conditions. He based this on a study of neighboring African peasant societies which had very different cultural practices and social structures. They would have extremely similar environmental conditions and yet would have very different economies, which he argued demonstrated that social structure and culture were the primary determining factors of the economic activity of peasant societies. Dalton also argued that this is demonstrated in the distribution of the factors of production in peasant societies. Unlike market economies where land, labour, and materials are purchased, in African peasant societies "land for homesteads and farms is acquired through tribal affiliation or kinship right." Alongside this, Dalton suggests that much of the organization of work would occur through social relationships within the community, such as "kinship and friendship reciprocity." He concludes that this largely social and cultural organization of production is due to relative absence of the pressure of market economies to reduce costs and maximize profits, which would "enforce economizing decisions on local producers." Dalton also argues that peasant societies were generally based on a socially guaranteed subsistence, with reciprocal gifts of produce, materials and livestock based on tribal and social relationships. These gifts would exchange between members of a particular tribe and would also involve tribute to the chief of the tribe, who would act as a steward of the society, and would maintain a retinue of warriors. These chiefs would also resolve conflicts between tribe members and provide emergency resources. The chief could also call upon members of the tribe to perform labour in service to them, like constructing their huts.

Soviet economist Alexander Chayanov argues that peasant economics is centered around the agricultural production of a family unit on a plot of land, known as a peasant holding. Through the direct labour of these family units on their plots, peasant holdings will produce a certain amount of goods either for their own consumption or in order to exchange them for necessary goods at local markets. Peasant holdings largely existed under feudal serfdom, which is characterized by the ownership of peasants and their land by a feudal lord, who would guarantee them their holdings and protection, while taking a proportion of the goods they produced. Soviet economist Chayanov argues that the peasant holdings did not operate in order to maximize their profits like a business would in a capitalist economy, but instead would seek to maintain an "equilibrium between family demand satisfaction and the drudgery of labour itself." This 'family demand satisfaction' is defined by Chayanov as the ability to "live and reproduce." According to Chayanov, this economic equilibrium would be determined by how large the family unit is, how much land they possess, their geographic location, their distance to local markets, the local economic factors of these markets, and the intensity of labour that is required to produce certain goods. For instance, Chayanov describes how some peasant holdings in northwest Russia in the early twentieth century had large family units but had little land in their holdings. In order to produce enough goods to meet their needs, they began to farm potatoes and hemp, "Which are often of lower profitability… but are more labour-intensive and thereby increase the farm family's gross product." Peasant holdings, while having to pay rent to their serfs, had control over the plots which they farmed, which meant that they could adjust what crops they farmed and how they generated their subsistence in order to maintain this economic equilibrium. An aspect of this subsistence-based economics was that the peasant holding did not seek to constantly expand itself (known as expanded reproduction), but just to meet the immediate requirements of its family unit (known as simple reproduction).

== European feudalism ==
In the early medieval period within Europe (around 1000 CE), the majority of land was controlled by warring baronies. These baronies had self-contained economies, and peasants were serfs beneath their lord. This meant that they could not leave their lord's service, or their land. All goods were produced directly within the barony by the peasants, with their lords taking a levy of at least two-fifths from their produce.

Gradually, new production methods such as the heavy wheeled plough, using cattle to fertilise land, harnessing horses rather than oxen, and the water mill saw a doubling in peasant food production by around 1300 CE. (Harman, 142-143) Harman suggests that the development of these new production techniques was a byproduct of serfdom, where peasants who owned an agricultural holding were incentivised to increase their food production to increase their own wealth, and lords would take a greater share from their levy. This extra food could be exchanged for imported or crafted goods at marketplaces within towns. This led to a general increase in wealth, particularly for feudal lords.

However, later during the 1300s CE, famines and plagues began to spread across Europe. Widespread malnutrition of the peasantry meant that half the population was wiped out. George Dubys suggests that a cause of this crisis was the inability for the grain-centred agriculture of feudal Europe to keep up with the rising living standards of the feudal nobility and the urban townships. Harman further suggests that this was compounded by little investment in agriculture by the feudal lords, who spent the majority of their wealth funding luxury goods and wars.

By around 1400 CE, the population of Europe began to gradually recover. Towns increased in importance, as rural food production on fertile land was linked to market networks. Merchants who were able to trade between Europe and India, South-East Asia, and China gained a large amount of wealth. This led to a new "putting-out" system of peasant agriculture, where merchants in towns would provide peasants with raw materials in exchange for their products.

Karl Marx describes how serfdom began to disappear in England by the end of the 14th century. Feudal agriculture was "characterised by division of the soil amongst the greatest possible number of subfeudatories." These "subfeudatories" were typically large estates who would hire peasants to work for wages on their large estates, as well as allocating them small plots of "4 or more acres," and "common land" which could be used collectively by all the peasants of an estate. However, Marx writes that new textile industries overseas created an increase in the price of English wool. This led to land enclosures, where land which was once owned by peasants for their own agriculture was fenced-off and used for pastures. This culminated in the "Acts For Enclosures of the Commons," where large estate owners would grant themselves ownership of common land through parliamentary decree. These enclosures took from peasants the land which was previously their subsistence. This led to a massive displacement of the population, which would later become concentrated into an industrial working class. This is seen by Marx as the shift from feudalism into capitalism.

== Peasants as moral or rational economic agents ==
Samuel Popkin defines a 'moral economic' approach to the political economy of peasants as one which "focuses on the relation between economic and social institutions". In the context of the peasantry in Vietnam, moral economists argue that Confucian and Vietnamese cultural values underpin peasant society, and that this ultimately was the source of the resistance to French colonial rule. The general assumptions of moral economists is that peasants are "anti-market, prefer common property to private, and dislike buying and selling". On the other hand, Popkin argues that these assumptions are not fixed, and are generally dependent on individual assessments of risk and reward amongst different peasants in different contexts.

Pierre Brocheux argues that a 'moral economy' in relation to peasants is one where the state and the peasantry form a contract which involves mutual and reciprocal obligations. Such as redistributing land from large landholders, reforming tax so that it is equitable, and a stimulation of agricultural production. However, Brocheux argues that in the Vietnamese peasant uprisings of the 1930s, this conflicted with the tendency of peasants to fall back into less productive family plots and peasant culture, rather than more productive collectivised agriculture. As such, Brocheux disagrees with Popkin that peasants are necessarily individualistic and rational economic agents, but that they are both rational and moral economic agents, and can have a tendency to "remain attached to the social order with which they are familiar".

== Peasants as an economic class ==
An economic class (according to the Marxist definition) has a shared relationship to the means of production. By this definition, peasants are an economic class that shares the relationship of serfdom. Serfdom is characterised by subsistence agriculture on a holding of land, a share of which is taken by a serf, who has legal ownership of the land.

However, as Nirmul Kumar Chandra suggests, peasants are often stratified by their wealth and amount of land they possessed, as was the case in Russia up to and during the Soviet Union. The richer peasants had more power then the poorer peasants in determining how collective land was shared, and were often taxed a lesser share of their output than the poorer peasants. Further, the richer peasants were less interested in collectivising their land into an agricultural commune, since they would lose a greater proportion of their wealth as it became shared between all peasants.

== See also ==
- Agricultural economics
- Agroecology
- Economic development
- Economic geography
- Electrical energy efficiency on United States farms
- Regional economics
- RIGA Project
- Rural development
- Rural economics
- Rural sociology
- Urban economics
