= Alexander Sergeevich Sukhanov =

Soviet metro construction worker and Hero of Socialist Labour

- Александр Сергеевич Суханов
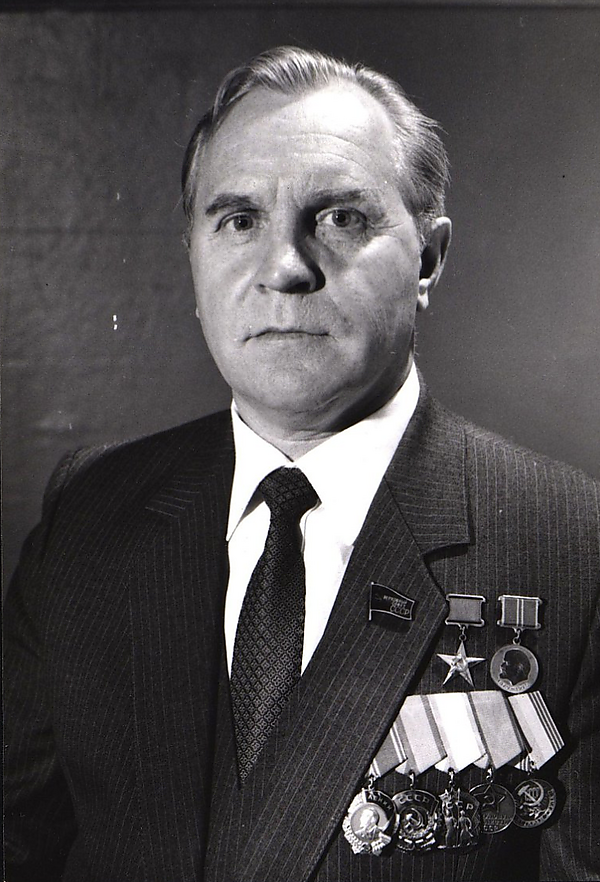
- Alexander Sergeevich Sukhanov
- Born: 6 May 1933; Moscow, Russian SFSR, Soviet Union
- Died: 28 September 1989 (aged 56); Moscow, Soviet Union
- Resting place: Old City Cemetery, Domodedovo, Moscow Oblast
- Citizenship: Soviet Union
- Occupations: Metro construction worker, tunneller, brigade leader
- Employer(s): Mosmetrostroy, Construction and Assembly Directorate No. 8
- Known for: Moscow Metro construction; Hero of Socialist Labour
- Awards: Hero of Socialist Labour; Order of Lenin; Order of the Red Banner of Labour; Order of the Badge of Honour; Medal "For Labour Valour"

Alexander Sergeevich Sukhanov (Russian: Александр Сергеевич Суханов; 6 May 1933 – 28 September 1989) was a Soviet metro construction worker, tunneller and brigade leader of Construction and Assembly Directorate No. 8 of Mosmetrostroy, the organisation responsible for construction of the Moscow Metro. He was awarded the title Hero of Socialist Labour in 1976. Sukhanov was also a deputy of the Supreme Soviet of the Soviet Union of the 10th and 11th convocations and a delegate to the 26th and 27th Congresses of the Communist Party of the Soviet Union.

== Early life and career ==
Sukhanov was born on 6 May 1933 in Moscow. According to the biographical profile published by the Heroes of the Country project, after completing vocational school he worked from 1948 as a toolmaker at a machine-building plant. He served in the Soviet Army from 1952 to 1955.

After his army service, Sukhanov connected his working life with metro construction. Published sources state that he worked in Metrostroy from 1955 and later became a brigade leader of tunnellers in Construction and Assembly Directorate No. 8 of Mosmetrostroy. Sources differ on the exact year when he became brigade leader: some give 1960, while the Heroes of the Country profile gives 1963.

== Work in Mosmetrostroy ==
Sukhanov's working career was principally associated with SMU-8 of Mosmetrostroy. He took part in the construction of tunnels and facilities on the Rizhsky, Filyovsky, Lyublinsky, Tagansko-Krasnopresnenskaya and Serpukhovsky radii of the Moscow Metro, as well as the Circle Line and the first stage of the Yerevan Metro.

The 1980 Moscow encyclopedia described Sukhanov as an initiator of progressive tunnel-driving technology on the Zhdanovsko-Krasnopresnenskaya line of the Moscow Metro.

During the Tenth Five-Year Plan, Sukhanov's brigade completed its five-year assignment early, on 20 July 1979. According to Heroes of the Country, during this period the brigade built 200 linear metres of station tunnels and 946 linear metres of running tunnels at Ploshchad Ilyicha station on the Kalininsky radius. Eighteen members of the brigade improved their qualification grades.

Sukhanov was described in Soviet and later industry materials as a highly skilled practical leader who "mastered" the main professions of metro construction and trained many workers, engineers and future brigade leaders.

== International metro construction context ==
Sukhanov's confirmed international work includes participation in the first stage of the Yerevan Metro, where Moscow metro builders worked alongside specialists from other Soviet cities. Historical material on the Yerevan Metro mentions Sukhanov together with another Hero of Socialist Labour, tunnelling brigade leader Ilya Shepelev.

Mosmetrostroy, the organisation in which Sukhanov worked, also had a broader role in Soviet technical assistance for metro construction abroad. A Soviet history of metro construction described the construction of the Prague Metro as a characteristic example of Soviet technical assistance to socialist countries, carried out through cooperation between Czechoslovak and Soviet specialists after a 1970 agreement on Soviet technical assistance. The same source states that Soviet tunnelling equipment was used in Prague and was installed with the help of Moscow specialists.

The Prague station now known as Anděl opened on 2 November 1985 under the name Moskevská. Contemporary Czech architectural sources describe it as part of a Prague–Moscow exchange in which Czechoslovak architects designed the Pražská station in Moscow, while architects from the USSR designed Moskevská in Prague. The Soviet architect Lev Nikolaevich Popov worked on the Prague station together with Czech architects including Eva Břusková and Marie Davidová.

No published source has yet been identified that directly confirms Sukhanov's personal participation in the construction or finishing works of the Prague Metro or the Moskevská/Anděl station.

== Political and public activity ==
Sukhanov was a member of the Communist Party of the Soviet Union. Published sources give slightly different dates for his joining the CPSU, either 1969 or 1970.

He was elected deputy of the Supreme Soviet of the USSR of the 10th and 11th convocations. He was also a delegate to the 26th and 27th Congresses of the CPSU.

At the 27th CPSU Congress in 1986, Sukhanov spoke as brigade leader of SMU-8 Mosmetrostroy and Hero of Socialist Labour. His speech supported the official party line on acceleration of socio-economic development and focused on labour discipline, responsibility, the anti-drunkenness campaign and the practical problems of metro construction.

The stenographic record of the 27th CPSU Congress also lists Sukhanov as a member of the commission preparing draft resolutions on the Political Report of the Central Committee, the new edition of the CPSU Programme and amendments to the Party Statute.

In his congress speech, Sukhanov criticised insufficient mechanisation of metro construction, poor coordination between customers, designers and builders, delays in project documentation and the quality of supplied machinery. He emphasised personal responsibility for work quality and production discipline.

In 1988, during political discussion over the regulation of meetings, rallies, street processions and demonstrations in the Soviet Union, Sukhanov supported legal regulation of public demonstrations. Published parliamentary materials quote him as warning that some people understood democracy as permissiveness and that perestroika was being accompanied by pseudo-revolutionary rhetoric and street demagogy in Moscow.

== Awards ==
Sukhanov received the following Soviet awards:

- Medal "For Labour Valour" — 18 March 1963, for work on the Kaluzhsky radius of the Moscow Metro;
- Order of the Badge of Honour — 16 June 1967, for work on the Zhdanovsky radius;
- Order of the Red Banner of Labour — 7 May 1971;
- Hero of Socialist Labour — 30 April 1976;
- Order of Lenin — 30 April 1976.

According to the Heroes of the Country profile, his Gold Medal "Hammer and Sickle" was No. 17832 and his Order of Lenin was No. 424907.

== Underground Horizons ==
In 1990, after Sukhanov's death, the Moscow publishing house Profizdat published his book Podzemnye gorizonty: dokumentalnaya povest (Russian: Подземные горизонты: документальная повесть, "Underground Horizons: A Documentary Novella"). Bibliographic records describe it as a documentary novella about the construction of the Moscow Metro and list it as approximately 335–336 pages.

== Film and archival footage ==
Sukhanov appears in Soviet documentary and archival materials from the perestroika period.

Net-Film holds a TASS photograph of Sukhanov speaking at the 27th CPSU Congress on 28 February 1986 in the Kremlin Palace of Congresses.

The 1987 documentary film Delegates includes an interview with Sukhanov about plans for the Twelfth Five-Year Plan and problems with spare-parts supply. The Net-Film description also lists a meeting of metro builders with O. N. Makarov, First Deputy Minister of Transport Construction of the USSR, where problems of Mosmetrostroy, the prestige of the profession and questions of perestroika were discussed.

Sukhanov is also listed among the figures appearing in the documentary film Strategy of Acceleration, produced in 1986 and devoted to the 27th CPSU Congress and the policy of socio-economic acceleration.

== Death and legacy ==
Sukhanov died on 28 September 1989. He was buried in Domodedovo, Moscow Oblast, at the Old City Cemetery.

Later Mosmetrostroy publications continued to mention Sukhanov as one of the well-known brigade leaders and Heroes of Socialist Labour associated with the history of the organisation.

== Works ==
- Sukhanov, A. S. Podzemnye gorizonty: dokumentalnaya povest [Underground Horizons: A Documentary Novella]. Moscow: Profizdat, 1990.
