= Karnataka Panchayat Administrative Service =

Karnataka Panchayat Administrative Service, popularly known as KPAS, is the civil service of Karnataka state in India. The Rural Development and Panchayat Raj Department conducts exams to recruit candidates for the service. The KPAS officers are usually appointed as Panchayat Development Officers known as PDO. They are trained under the Abdul Nazeer Sab State Institute of Rural Development and Panchayat Raj (ANSSIRD PR), Mysuru

THE KARNATAKA 1[GRAM SWARAJ AND PANCHAYAT RAJ]1 ACT, 1993 1. Substituted by Act 44 of 2015 w.e.f. 25.02.2016.

CHAPTER XVI 1[Administration, inspection, supervision and creation of commissionerate of Gram Swaraj and Panchayat Raj]1

Section 232B Constitution of the Karnataka Panchayat Administrative Service, – The Government shall constitute a Karnataka panchayat administrative service consisting of such category of posts from the rural development and panchayat raj department, the number of posts, scale of pay, method of recruitment and minimum qualifications shall be such as may be prescribed]1 1. Inserted by Act 44 of 2015 w.e.f. 25.02.2016
