= Meghashrey =

Indian non-governmental organization

- Formation: 2000
- Founder: Seema Singh
- Type: Non-governmental organization
- Headquarters: Bandra, Mumbai, Maharashtra, India
- Region served: India
- Fields: Rural development, education, healthcare, women's empowerment
- Website: www.meghashrey.com

Meghashrey NGO is an Indian non-governmental organization based in Mumbai, Maharashtra. It was started in 2000 by Seema Singh. The organization runs social programs related to farming, public health, skill development for women, and distributing school supplies.

== History and activities ==
The NGO was founded in Mumbai to work on food security and literacy programs. Its work is mainly focused on communities in Maharashtra and Bihar.

The organization splits its work into four areas:

- Rural development: The group trains small farmers in organic farming and regular agricultural techniques.
- Public health: The NGO runs awareness camps about cervical cancer prevention in rural towns.
- Vocational training: The group runs small training centers for tailoring and crafts to help women earn an income.
- Educational aid: The group distributes books and stationery items to schools that lack resources.

== Recognition ==
Founder Seema Singh received a "Champions of Change Award" from former President of India Ram Nath Kovind for healthcare campaigns. The NGO's programs have been presented to government officials, including Nitin Gadkari and Chirag Paswan.
