= Gavade Ambere =

Village in Maharashtra

- Village
- Location in Maharashtra, India Gavade Ambere (India)
- Country: India
- State: Maharashtra

Gavade Ambere is a village in Ratnagiri district in Western India. It had a population of 2,194, according to the 2011 Census of India.

Gavade comes from the surname of a family living there before the 1940s. Ambere stems from Alphanso Mangoes (in Marathi it is called Amba), for which the area is known. Hence, the name of the village is Gavade Ambere.

Various religious and community people reside in this village. This village is known for work of several legends like Late Shankar Abhyankar, Late Kashinath kelkar, late Gajanan birje, Late Sonu Dongre, Late Rajjak kazi, and later with support of Sandip Birje, Pramod Tivarekar, Sudhakar Kumbhar, Kishor Shivanekar, Ramchandra Amberkar, Uttam Abhyankar, Vikas Abhyankar etc. These people supported the village all the time to get out from the critical situations and rural development. This Village has got a God gifted nature surrounding. Mainly people's are dependent on farming and fishing.

Places To Visit:

1. Best of Nature
2. Vishveshwer Temple
3. Long Beach
4. Satparya River
5. Jakadevi and Jugadevi Temples
6. Tivarekar wadi Cricket ground
7. Muchkundi Khadi

Nearest place: Purnagad Fort, Swami Swarupanand Mandir.
