= Rizhsky =

Rizhsky (masculine), Rizhskaya (feminine), or Rizhskoye (neuter) may refer to:

- Rizhsky railway station, a rail terminal in Moscow, Russia
- Rizhskaya (Kaluzhsko-Rizhskaya line), a station of the Moscow Metro, Line 6
- Rizhskaya (Bolshaya Koltsevaya line), a prospective station of the Moscow Metro, Line 11

== See also ==
- Riga (disambiguation)
