= Mosmetrostroy =

- Company type: OJSC
- Industry: Construction
- Founded: 1931
- Headquarters: Moscow, Russia
- Area served: Worldwide
- Key people: Sergey Zhukov (General Director)
- Products: tunnels, metro stations
- Revenue: $496 million (2017)
- Operating income: $41.3 million (2017)
- Net income: $12.4 million (2017)
- Total assets: $1.04 billion (2017)
- Total equity: $484 million (2017)
- Number of employees: 9,000 (end 2011)
- Website: metrostroy.com

OJSC Mosmetrostroy (Russian: Мосметрострой, abbr. of "Moscow Metro Construction [Department]") is a major Russian construction company, which deals with solving engineering problems related to performance of a wide range of under and above-ground works. The company is the successor of the Metrostroy Department formed in 1931 to set a new branch of construction industry — metro and tunnel construction. In eight decades Mosmetrostroy has constructed 180 metro stations in Moscow along with implementing its projects throughout the post-Soviet space and abroad. At the present moment Mosmetrostroy acts as general contractor building metro stations in Moscow and has won a contract to construct a segment of Mumbai Metro Rail's underground line. via a joint venture with Hindustan Construction Company Ltd.

Earlier it had been awarded two contract packages to performing tunnelling and station construction in consortium with Gammon India Ltd. in Chennai, India. However it abandoned the Chennai Metro Rail project partway through after its requests for cost escalation were denied. The contract was terminated, and the subsequent court case allowed re-tendering of the remaining work to other vendors

== See also ==
- Moscow Metro
- Mumbai Metro
- Chennai Metro
- High-speed railway to Jerusalem
