= Riga, New York =

- Town
- Motto: "The first pioneers of Monroe County"
- Location in Monroe County and the state of New York

- Location of New York in the United States
- Coordinates: 43°04′10″N 77°53′02″W
- Country: United States
- State: New York
- County: Monroe
- Established: April 8, 1808; 218 years ago

Government
  - Town supervisor: Robert E. Ottley (R) First elected 2009 Town council: David L. Smith (R); James S. Fodge (R); Deborah S. Campanella (R); Brad O'Brocta ()

Area
  - Total: 35.23 sq mi (91.2 km^{2})
  - Land: 34.97 sq mi (90.6 km^{2})
  - Water: 0.27 sq mi (0.70 km^{2})
- Elevation: 577 ft (176 m)

Population (2020)
  - Total: 5,586
  - Density: 160.9/sq mi (62.14/km^{2})
- Time zone: UTC-5 (EST)
  - Summer (DST): UTC-4 (EDT)
- ZIP Codes: 14428 (Riga); 14416 (Bergen)
- Area code: 585
- FIPS code: 36-055-61808
- Website: www.townofriga.com

Riga is a town in Monroe County, New York, United States. The population was 5,586 at the 2020 census. The town is in the western part of the county. Locally, the town's name is pronounced RYE-ga, instead of REE-ga like the capital of Latvia.

== History ==
In the 18th century, the lands of present-day Riga were part of the "Mill Seat Tract" deeded by Native Americans to Phelps and Gorham. Soon thereafter, Robert Morris of Philadelphia acquired the land and sold it to the estate of Sir William Pulteney in England.

The Riga area was originally part of Ontario County, set up by the State Legislature in 1789. It later became part of Genesee County. The first organized town between the Genesee River and Lake Erie was Northampton. In 1802, Northampton was divided into Leicester, Batavia, Southampton, Northampton, and East and West Pulteney - after Sir William Pulteney. In 1808 East and West Pulteney became East and West Riga, and in 1809 the town of Riga was formed.

The Riga Academy was listed on the National Register of Historic Places in 1980.

== Geography ==
Riga is in western Monroe County, 15 miles (24 km) southwest of downtown Rochester. It is bordered on the north by the town of Ogden, on the east by the town of Chili, and on the south by the town of Wheatland. The town is bordered on the west and southwest by the towns of Bergen and Le Roy in Genesee County. Interstate 490 crosses the town.

According to the U.S. Census Bureau, the town of Riga has a total area of 35.2 square miles (91 km^{2}), of which 35.0 square miles (91 km^{2}) are land and 0.3 square miles (0.8 km^{2}), or 0.75%, are water.

== Demographics ==
Historical population
Census	Pop.	Note	%±
1820	3,139		—
1830	1,917		−38.9%
1840	1,984		3.5%
1850	2,159		8.8%
1860	2,177		0.8%
1870	2,171		−0.3%
1880	2,221		2.3%
1890	2,031		−8.6%
1900	1,864		−8.2%
1910	1,853		−0.6%
1920	1,649		−11.0%
1930	1,718		4.2%
1940	1,669		−2.9%
1950	1,906		14.2%
1960	2,800		46.9%
1970	3,746		33.8%
1980	4,309		15.0%
1990	5,114		18.7%
2000	5,437		6.3%
2010	5,590		2.8%
2020	5,586		−0.1%
U.S. Decennial Census

As of the census of 2000, there were 5,437 people, 1,969 households, and 1,518 families residing in the town. The population density was 154.6 inhabitants per square mile (59.7/km^{2}). There were 2,018 housing units at an average density of 57.4 per square mile (22.2/km^{2}). The racial makeup of the town was 97.26% White, 0.72% African American, 0.15% Native American, 0.74% Asian, 0.04% Pacific Islander, 0.09% from other races, and 1.01% from two or more races. Hispanic or Latino of any race were 0.92% of the population.

There were 1,969 households, out of which 39.1% had children under the age of 18 living with them, 64.9% were married couples living together, 9.1% had a female householder with no husband present, and 22.9% were non-families. 18.6% of all households were made up of individuals, and 7.6% had someone living alone who was 65 years of age or older. The average household size was 2.75 and the average family size was 3.15.

In the town, the population was spread out, with 28.3% under the age of 18, 6.1% from 18 to 24, 30.5% from 25 to 44, 25.6% from 45 to 64, and 9.6% who were 65 years of age or older. The median age was 38 years. For every 100 females, there were 99.2 males. For every 100 females age 18 and over, there were 93.5 males.

The median income for a household in the town was $58,842, and the median income for a family was $65,106. Males had a median income of $47,083 versus $31,202 for females. The per capita income for the town was $23,590. About 3.3% of families and 3.8% of the population were below the poverty line, including 2.3% of those under age 18 and 10.7% of those age 65 or over.

== Government ==
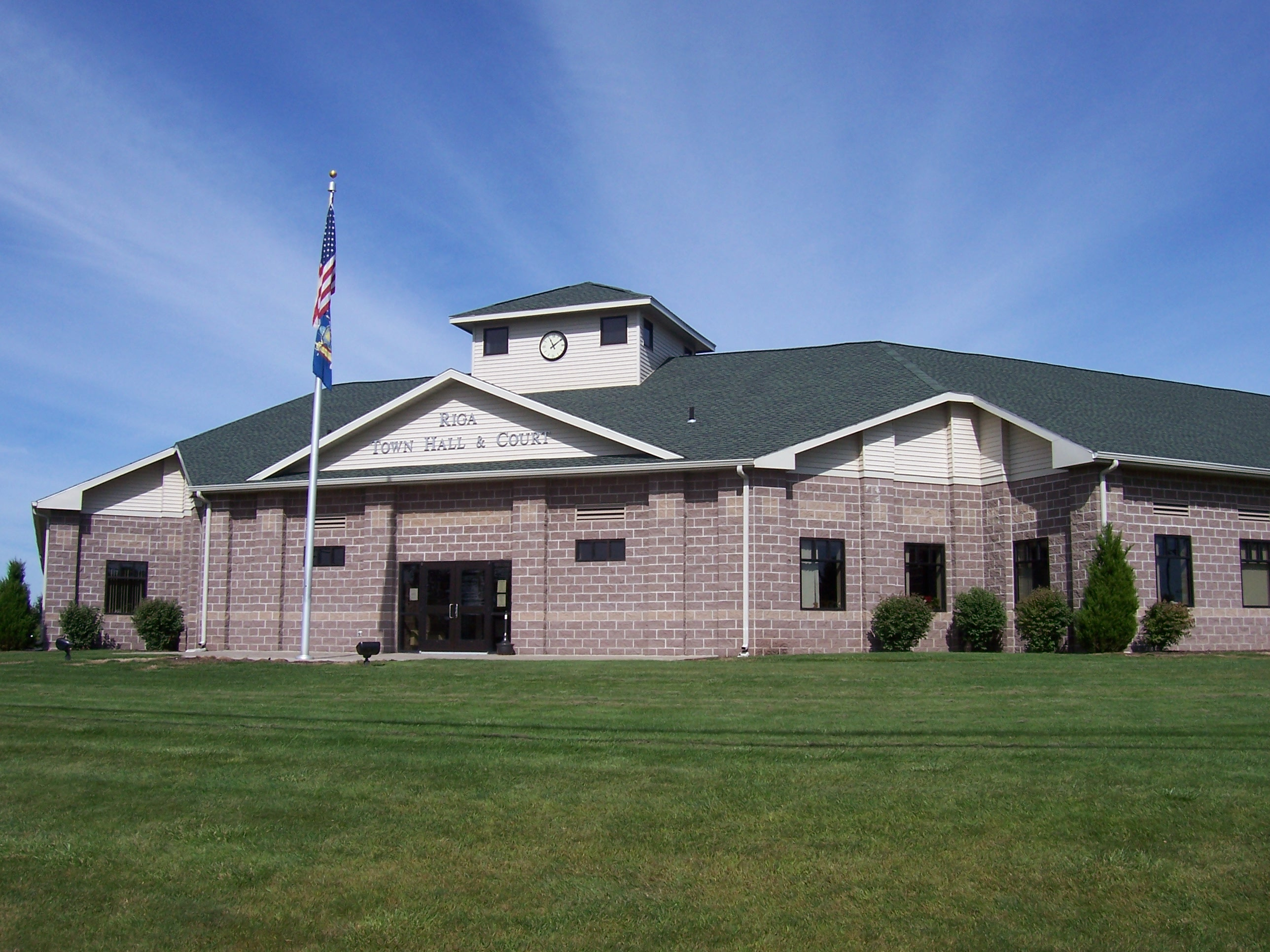
Riga town hall

The town is governed by a town board, consisting of a town supervisor and four council members, all elected by registered town voters.

== Communities and locations ==
- Churchville – a village in the northwest part of the town on Route 33
- Churchville Park – a park in the northwest part of the town
- Five Points – a location east of Riga on Route 33A
- Riga (or Riga Center) – a hamlet on Route 33A
