= Critical mass (disambiguation) =

Critical mass is the amount of fissile material needed to sustain nuclear fission.

Critical mass may also refer to:

== Science and technology ==
- Critical mass (sociodynamics), a stage in social-system innovation

== Organizations and social gatherings ==
- Critical Mass (cycling), a form of direct action and celebratory gathering involving large groups of bicycle riders
- Critical Mass Energy Project, an anti-nuclear umbrella group founded by Ralph Nader
  - Critical Mass Journal, published in 1977 by the Critical Mass Energy Project
- Critical Mass, a co-working center sponsored by the New England Venture Capital Association
- Critical Mass, a robotics team of the Dwight-Englewood School in Englewood, New Jersey

== Literature ==
- "Critical Mass" (Arthur C. Clarke short story), 1949
- "Critical Mass" (Pohl and Kornbluth short story), by Frederik Pohl and Cyril M. Kornbluth, 1962
- Critical Mass (book), a 2004 popular science book by Philip Ball
- Critical Mass, a 1990 comic book limited series published by Shadowline Saga
- Critical Mass, a 1994 current events book by William E. Burrows and Robert Windrem
- Critical Mass, a 2013 novel by Sara Paretsky
- Critical Mass, a 2023 novel by Daniel Suarez
- Critical Masses, a 1998 book by Thomas Wellock

== Film and television ==
- Critical Mass, a 1971 experimental short film from Hollis Frampton's Hapax Legomena cycle
- Critical Mass (anime), a subdivision of the video publisher and distributor Right Stuf Inc.
- Critical Mass (film), a 2000 film starring Treat Williams and Lori Loughlin
- "Critical Mass" (Adderly), a 1986 television episode
- "Critical Mass" (Stargate Atlantis), a 2006 television episode

== Gaming ==
- Duke Nukem: Critical Mass, a shooter game developed by Frontline Studios
- Critical Mass (1985 video game) or Power!, a computer game by Durell Software
- Critical Mass (1982 video game), an adventure game by Sirius Software
- Critical Mass, a set of collectible miniature game figures by HeroClix

== Music ==
=== Bands ===
- Critical Mass (Canadian band), a Catholic rock band formed in 1997
- Critical Mass (Dutch band), a Dutch happy hardcore group

=== Albums and songs ===
- Critical Mass (Dave Holland album), 2006
- Critical Mass (Threshold album), 2002
- Critical Mass (Matthew Shipp album), 1995
- Critical Mass (Ra album), 2013
- "Critical Mass", a song by Aerosmith from Draw the Line
- "Critical Mass", a song by Nuclear Assault from Handle with Care
- "Critical Mass", a song by Chrome from Half Machine Lip Moves
