= SS Riga =

A number of steamships were named Riga, including:

- SS Riga (1914), a Latvian cargo ship which sank in 1939
- SS Riga (1925), a German cargo ship in service 1925–34
