= Riga Academy =

Historic building in New York, United States

- U.S. National Register of Historic Places
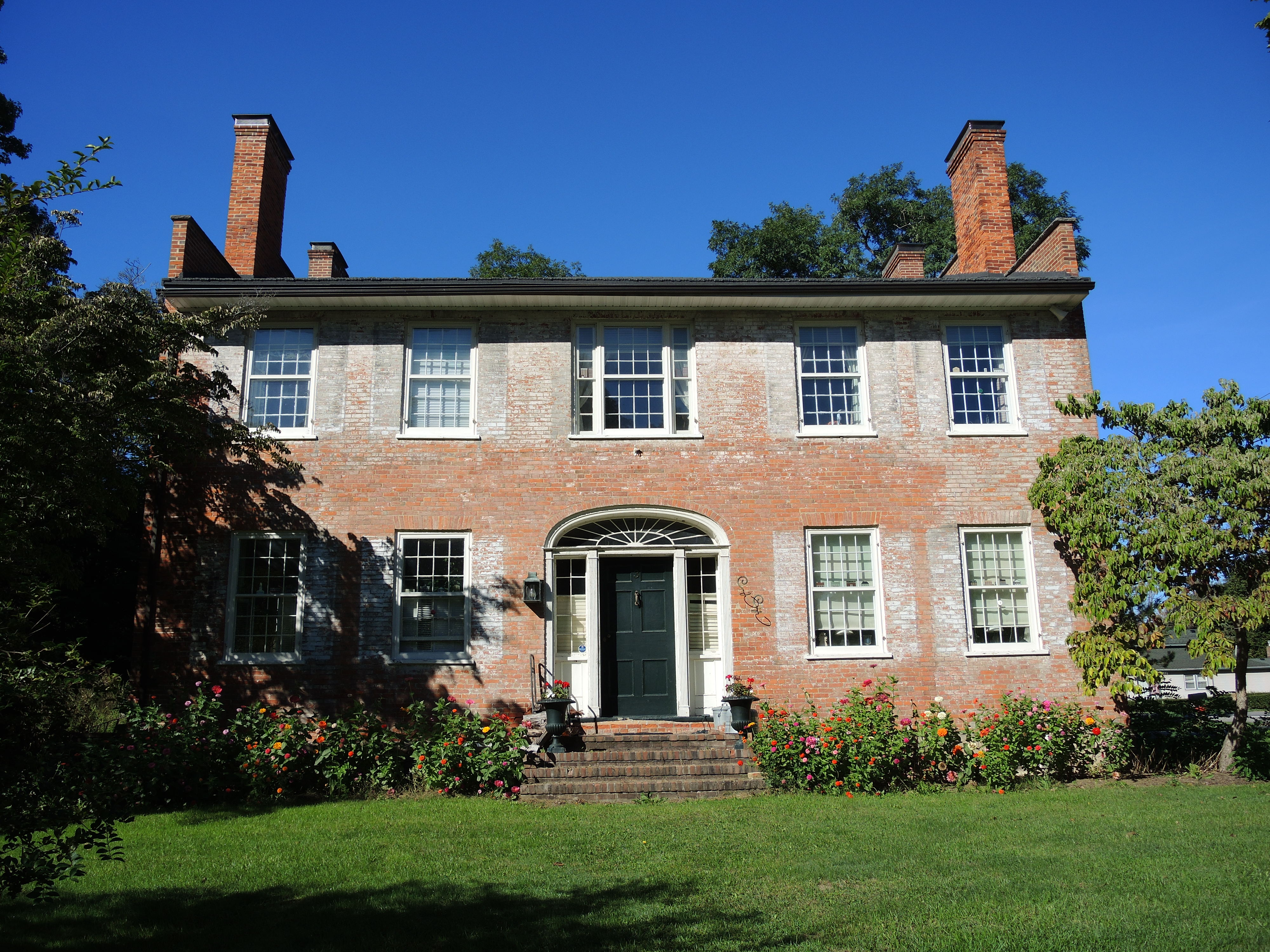

- Location within New York Location within the United States
- Location: 3 Riga-Mumford Rd., Riga, New York
- Coordinates: 43°4′9″N 77°52′47″W
- Area: 0.5 acres (0.20 ha)
- Built: 1811
- Architectural style: Federal
- NRHP reference No.: 80002653
- Added to NRHP: November 21, 1980

Riga Academy is a historic building located at Riga in Monroe County, New York. It was constructed in 1811 and is a two-story, five bay Federal style building. Built originally as a tavern and inn, it was converted for use as an academy in 1846. It was used as a school from 1847 to 1861, at which time it became a private residence.

It was listed on the National Register of Historic Places in 1980.

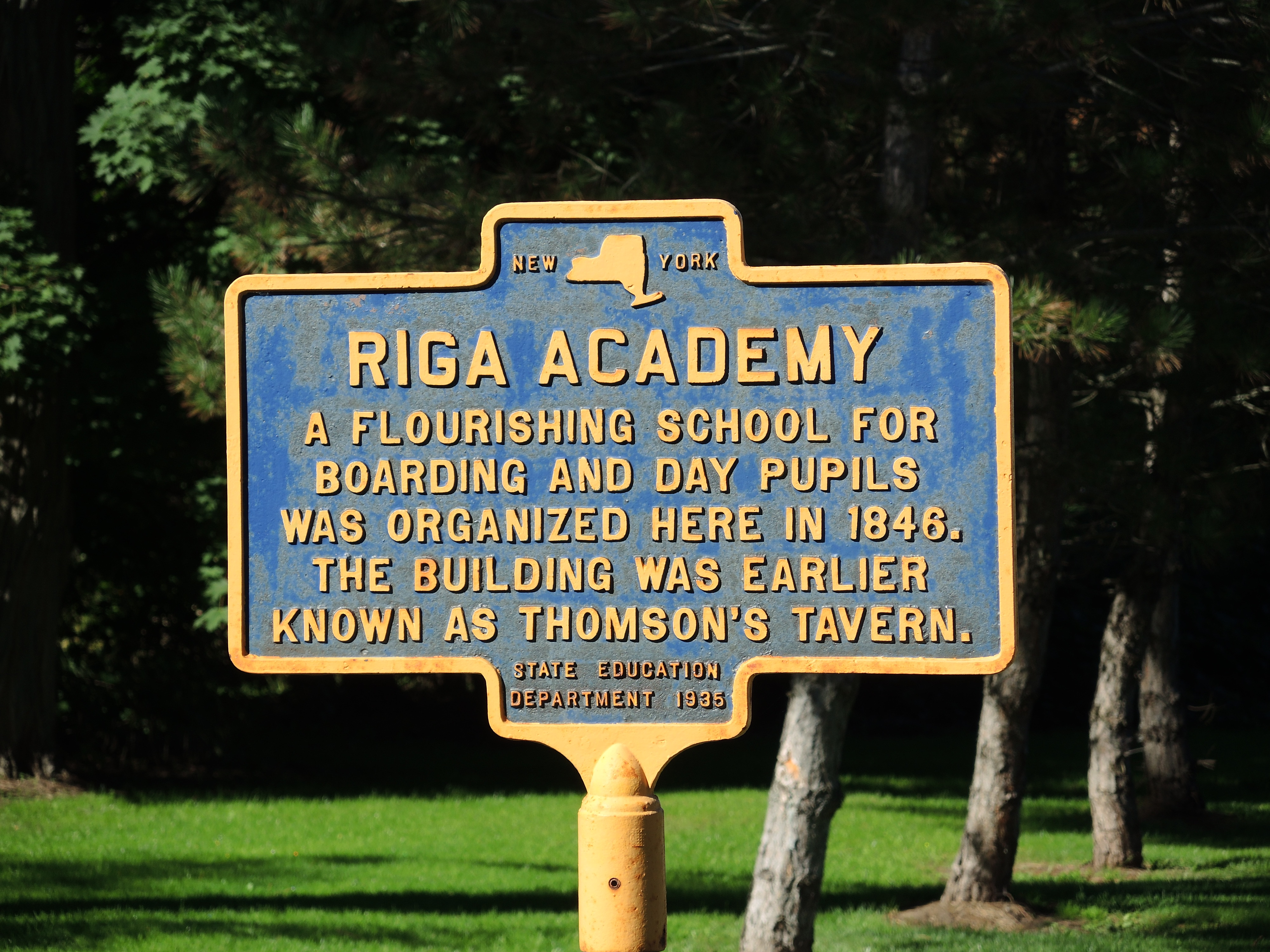

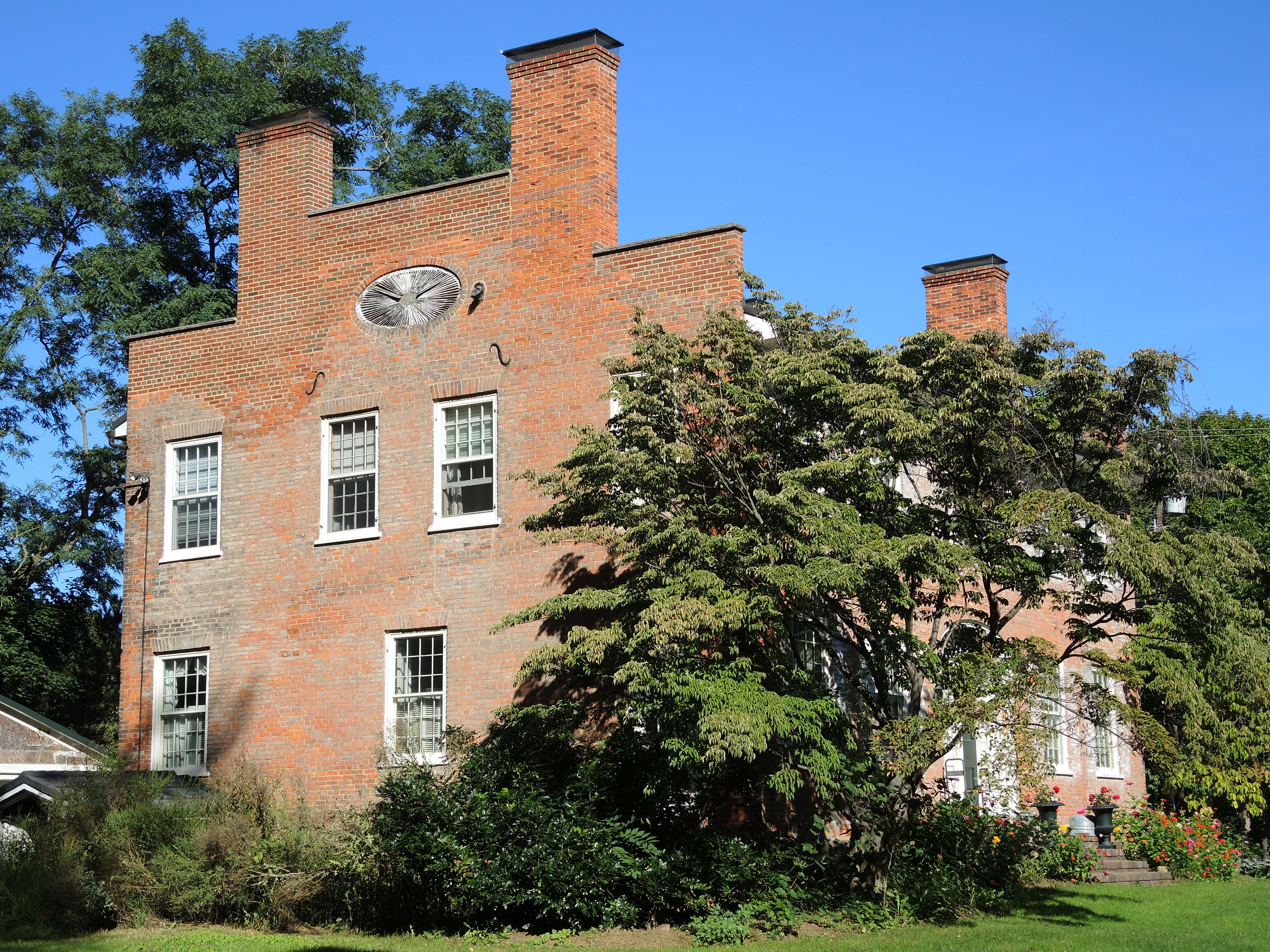
