= Alexander Chayanov =

Soviet scholar (1888-1937)

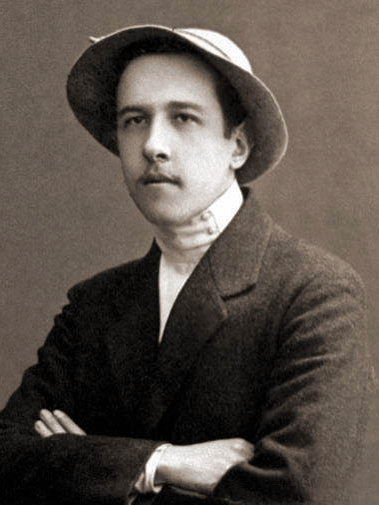
- Chayanov in 1910
- Born: 17 January 1888; Moscow, Moscow Governorate, Russian Empire
- Died: October 3, 1937 (aged 49); Alma-Ata, Kazakh SSR, Soviet Union
- Scientific career
- Fields: economics

Alexander Vasilyevich Chayanov (Russian: Александр Васильевич Чаянов; 17 January 1888 – 3 October 1937) was a Russian, then Soviet agrarian economist, scholar of rural sociology, and advocate of agrarianism and cooperatives.

== Personal life ==
Chayanov was born in Moscow, the son of a merchant, Vasily Ivanovich Chayanov, and an agronomist, Elena Konstantinovna (born Klepikova). He attended a Realschule (1899–1906) and the Moscow Agricultural Institute (1906–1911), becoming an agronomist; he taught and published works on agriculture until 1914, when he began working for various government institutions. In 1912 he married Elena Vasilevna Grigorieva, a marriage that lasted until 1920. In 1921 he married Olga Emmanuilovna Gurevich; they had sons Nikita (born 1922) and Vasily (born 1925).

== After the Russian Revolution ==
After the October Revolution, he served on several Soviet committees for agrarian reform and was a member of Narkomzem as well as "holding lecturing and administrative posts at several universities and academies."

He was a proponent of agricultural cooperatives, but was skeptical about the inefficiency of large-scale farms. Chayanov's skepticism was rooted in the idea that households, especially peasant households which practice subsistence farming, will tend to produce only the amount of food that they need to survive. He believed that the Soviet government would find it difficult to force these households to cooperate and produce a surplus. These views were sharply criticized by Joseph Stalin as "defence of the kulaks".

=== Prosecution ===
In 1930 Chayanov was arrested in the Case of the Labour Peasant Party (Трудовая крестьянская партия), fabricated by the NKVD. The process was intended to be a show trial, but Stalin decided that the case did not look sufficiently convincing and ordered a conviction in a secret trial («в закрытом порядке», "in a closed manner"). In 1932 Chayanov was sentenced to five years in the Kazakhstan labor camps.

In 1937, Chayanov was arrested again and was shot after his name appeared on an execution list signed by Stalin and Molotov.

== Aftermath and rehabilitation ==
His wife Olga was repressed as well and spent 18 years in labour camps; she was released in 1955 and died in 1983. Chayanov was rehabilitated in 1987.

== Published work ==
Chayanov's major works, Peasant Farm Organisation (originally published in Russian in 1925) and On the Theory of Non-Capitalist Economic Systems were first translated into English in 1966. Chayanov's theory of the peasant household influenced economic anthropology. The substantivist Marshall Sahlins drew on Chayanov in his theory of the domestic mode of production, but later authors have argued that Chayanov's use of neo-classical economics supports a formalist position.

His book Puteshestvie moego brata Alekseia v stranu krest’ianskoi utopii [My brother Alexei's journey into the land of peasant utopia] (Moskva: Gosizdat, 1920) predicted a rapid transfer of power into peasant hands; its hero wakes up in 1984, "in a country where the village has conquered the city, where handicraft cooperatives have replaced industry." Like Evgeny Zamyatin's We, it contains theosophical elements.

Between 1918 and 1928 he also wrote five Gothic stories which he published at his own expense under the pseudonyms Anthropologist A, Phytopathologist U, and Botanist Kh (Russian: Ботаник Х), with illustrations by his friends; three of them have been translated into English.

== Consumption-labour-balance principle ==
The higher the ratio of dependents to workers in a household, the harder the workers have to work. Chayanov proposed that peasants would work as hard as they needed in order to meet their subsistence needs, but had no incentive beyond those needs and therefore would slow and stop working once they were met. The principle, which is called the consumption-labour-balance principle, is therefore that labour will increase until it meets (balances) the needs (consumption) of the household. This view of peasant farming implies that it will not develop into capitalism without some external, added factor. Furthermore, the peasant's way of life is seen as ideologically opposed to capitalism in that the family work for a living, not for a profit. Evidence for this principle is found in the actions of Turkish peasants after the collapse of cereal prices in 1929.

=== In practice ===
In practice, the consumption-labour-balance principle means that accounting is not as precise on a farm than in a regular financial capitalist company. This, as there is no separation between capital and labour. Accounting works with an artificial cost structure which charges all kinds of costs which in reality, a farm does not have. For example, wage and farm-grown animals as well as organic fertiliser and animal feed are charged against commercial (artificial) fertiliser and composed animal feeds. A bought tractor is written off in four years against the bought value while the farmer often buys a second hand tractor and carries along with it for another 15 years.

== Chayanov's influence ==
Chayanov's ideas have survived him. His work was rediscovered by Westerners in the mid-1960s. Agricultural sociologists, anthropologists and ethnologists working in developing countries, where the peasant economy remains a predominant factor, apply his theory to help understand the nature of the family labour farm. Halil İnalcık, the leading historian of the Ottoman Empire, applied his ideas to peasant land tenure in the Ottoman Empire.

Beginning in the mid-1990s, Vladimir Megre's Ringing Cedars series have many points in common with Chayanov.
