= Riga (moped) =

Motorcycle model produced in Riga, Latvia

The Riga was a Latvian moped built in Riga between 1965 and 1992.

== The history of engine production ==
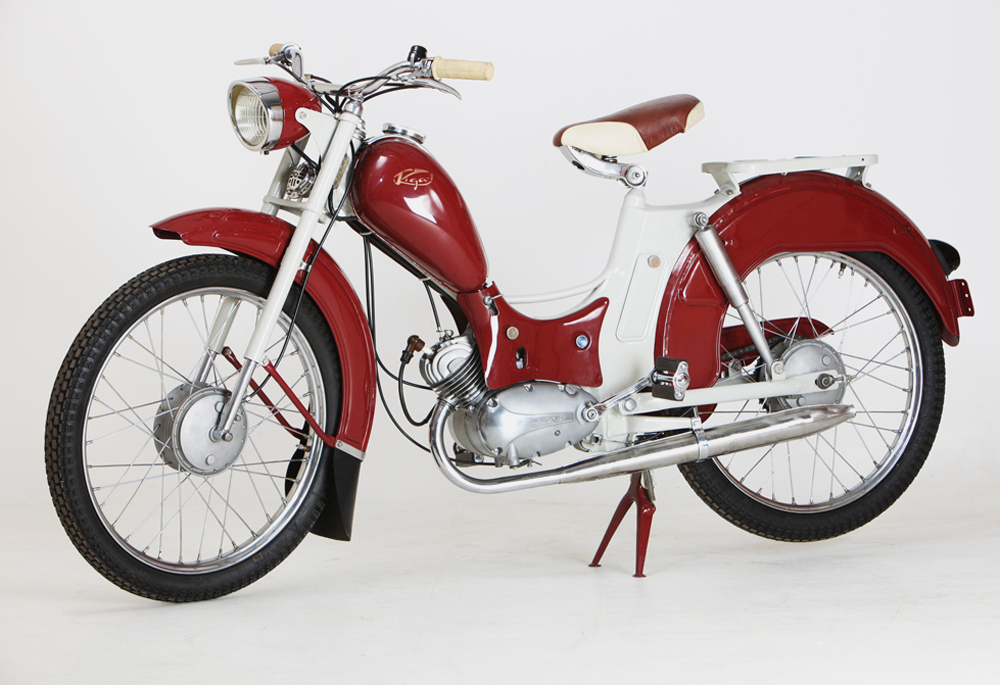
Moped "Riga-1", Riga motorcycle factory (1961–1965)

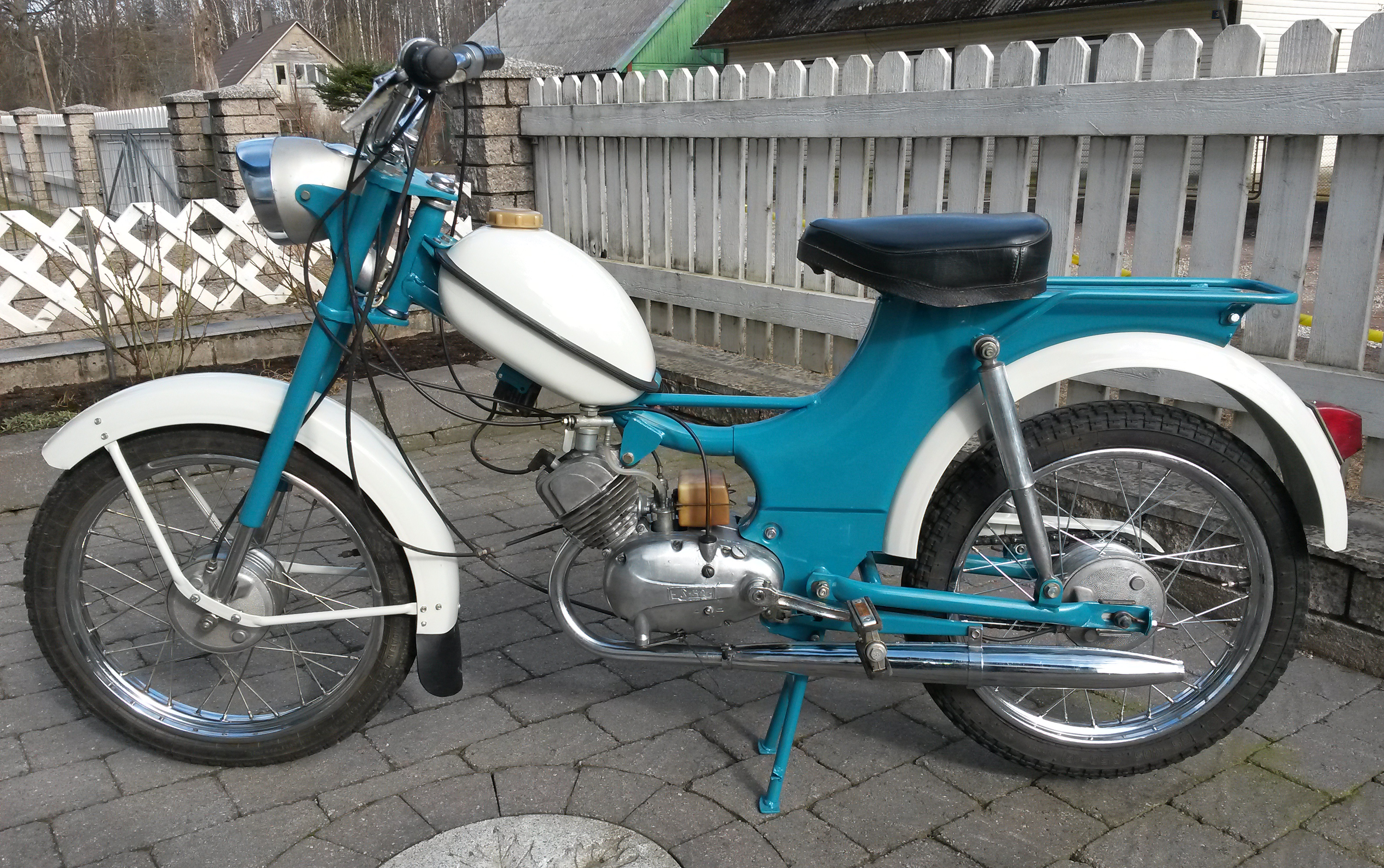
Riga-4 moped (1970–1974)

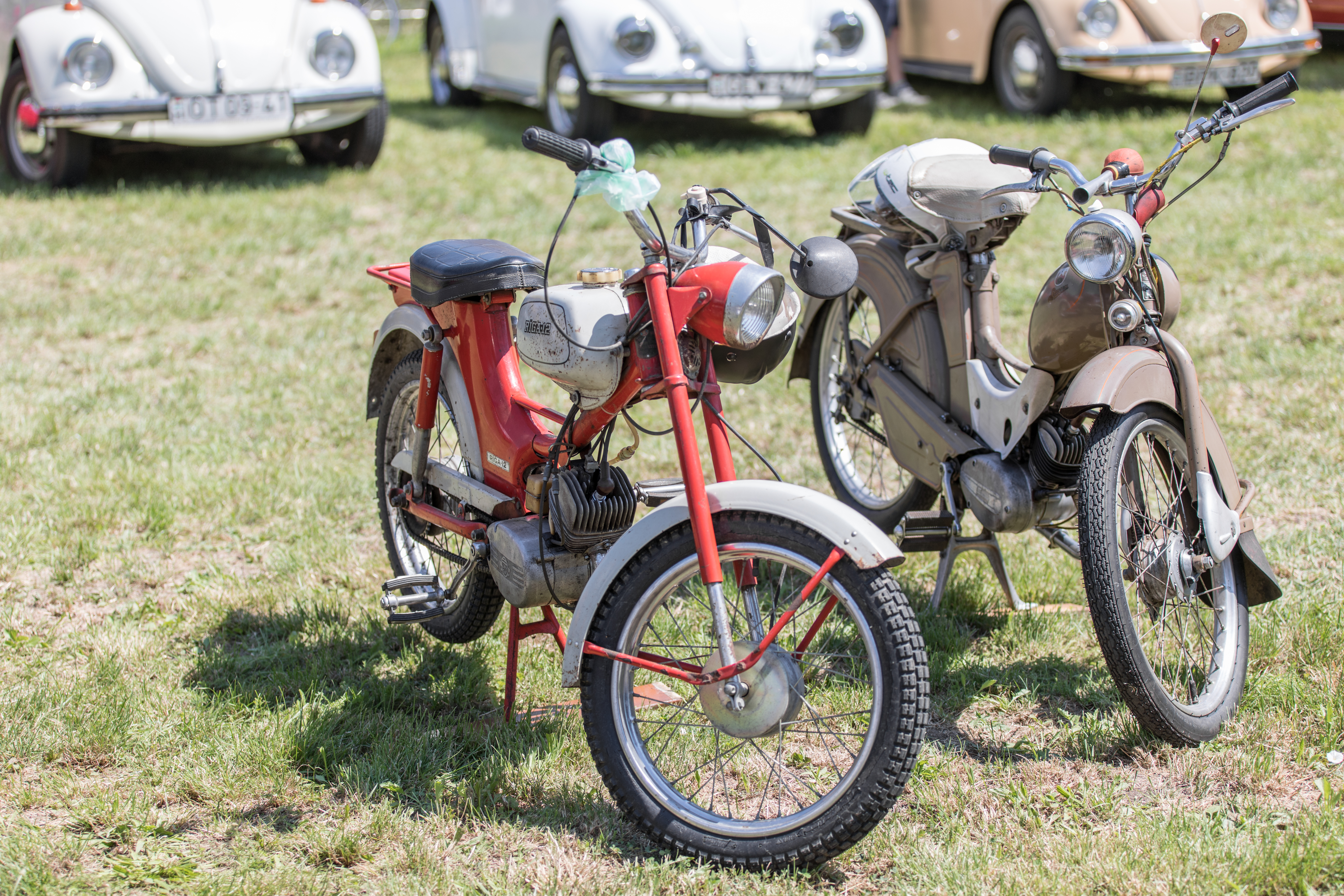
Riga 12, next to a Simson SR2E

In the 1960s, the idea of providing people of the Soviet Union with an easy to use, easy to maintain, motorised transport took form. The idea was followed by action and a plan was formed at Riga Engine Factory "Sarkanā zvaigzne". Initially, the Hungarian Dongó, bicycle-mounted auxiliary engine and the Velosolex motorcycle was tested, but these vehicles did not bring the expected success, so they turned their attention toward light motorcycles as they had proved popular in the West.

== Types ==
In 1965 the first model, called Riga-1, was released. The frame and look was inspired by the East German Simson Suhl. The engine was an imported Czechoslovak-made Jawa Stadion S11/S22 engine. It used a two speed gearbox and foot pedals could also be used. Later production of the engine was brought in-house.

In 1967 the successor, Riga-3, was presented at the Budapest International Fair. It was not much different from its predecessor, however, some changes were done to be able to use the S-51 engine. It was a 49.8 cc, air cooled, 1.5 HP engine using carburetor, mostly of type K30 or K35. It had 19" wheels and skirted fenders.

In 1969 a more streamlined version, Riga-4, was introduced. The design of the engine had undergone numerous changes. The large-diameter, 19-inch wheels were replaced by smaller, 16-inch wheels, which remained until the end of the Riga moped production. The fuel tank was replaced. The new engine, S-52, was a 2 to 2.2 hp engine. In the last production year the all-plastic tail light cover from the previous design was replaced by metal.

In 1974 the Riga-12 was released. It had significantly changed its appearance and functioning. While the earlier models had a rounded fuel tank it was now replaced by a less flashy, rounded off, rectangular shape. It still maintained its pedal-crank functionality.

In 1979 Riga-16 was released. It essentially looked like the Riga-12. The engine was now a S-58, and pedal-cranks were not used in the design. The exhaust system had also changed; it was much longer. The seat was the long type, and more comfortable. The rear lamps were changed to a larger hexagonal-shape. It also came in metallic paint.

1981 the Riga-22 was released. At first it had a Š-62 engine, then starting from 1984 Riga-22 was equipped with a V-50 engine. First V-50 models had no external differences from the Š-62, but the internals were redesigned. It had a similar looking, but, better clutch. The only identical parts were plastic friction discs. Instead of 2 friction discs, the V-50 had 3 friction discs, and the gearbox in V-50 had ball bearings, instead of plain bearings. It had a new, and more modern electronic ignition, and the fuel tank was redesigned. The new V-50 engine was also used. Riga-22 was produced until 1989.

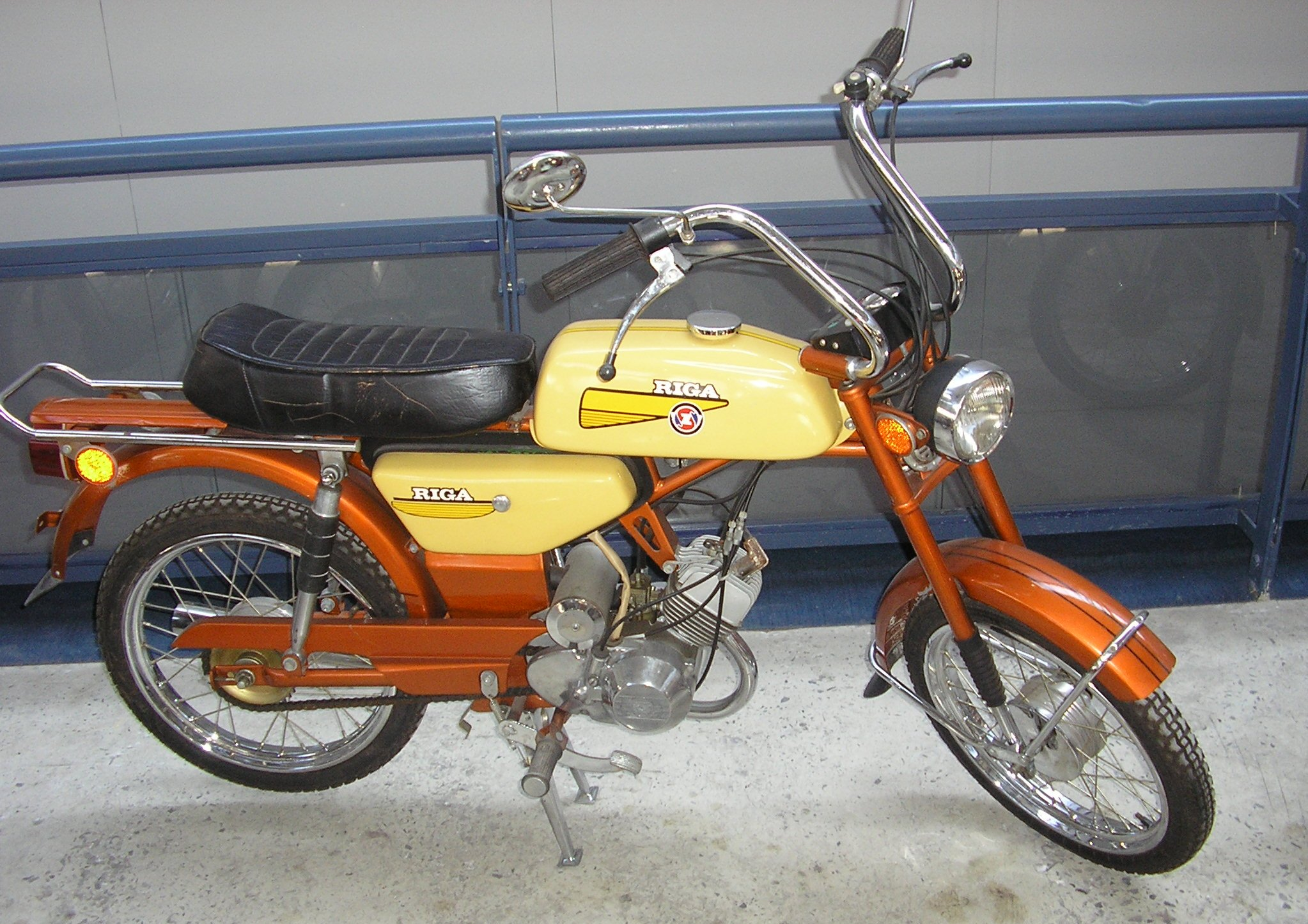
"Rīga-18" mokik experimental 1978

1986 was a turn-around year for Riga. Deteriorating quality and engine problems made the need of a new model apparent. So in 1986 the new Riga Delta was introduced. The engine in no way resembles its predecessor. The frame is completely changed. It has a new fuel tank, with only "Delta" written on it. Replaced the front and rear lamps and ignition. The Deltas were available in three colours pea-green, brick red and beige. Deltas also featured 3 gear gearbox.

In 1986 the Mini Riga was introduced. It was a mini moped using the V-50 and later V-501 engines. In the early 1990s the engine was changed to the well-known Jawa 210 Babette's two-speed, automatic transmission engine.

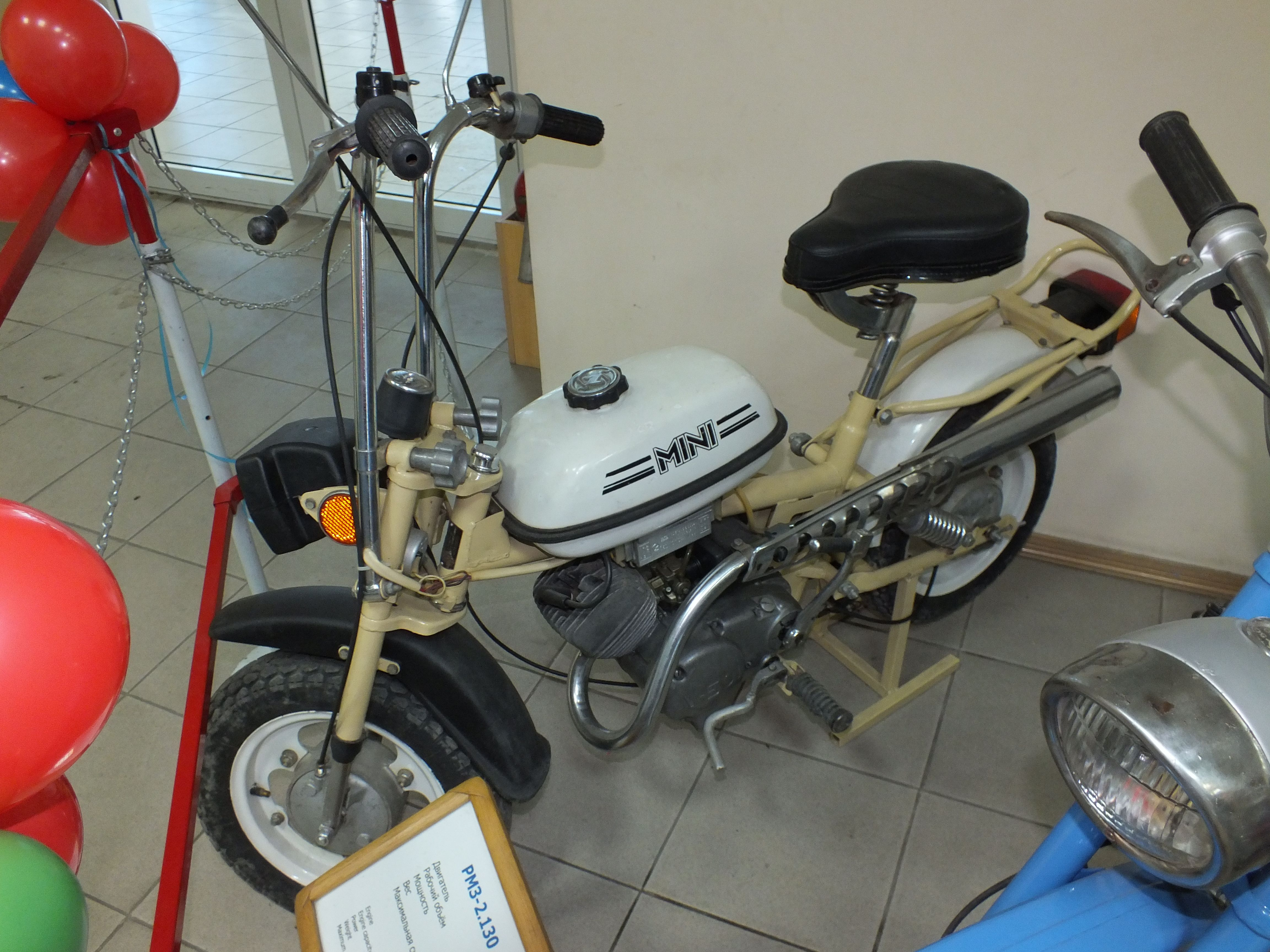
Riga-Mini

== Verkhovyna ==
The Verkhovyna made in Lwow factory did not look like the Riga, but used identical mechanics.

== Other types ==
"Sarkanā zvaigzne" was in its heyday in the 1970s very actively involved in motor sport. Especially the 125 cc category and built Riga-5S, 15S-Riga, Riga and Riga-19S-17S type that had significant success in the Soviet Union and the Baltic championships.
