= Global production network =

Concept in developmental literature

Global Production Networks (GPN) is a concept in developmental literature which refers to "the nexus of interconnected functions, operations and transactions through which a specific product or service is produced, distributed and consumed."

== Global Production Networks ==
A global production network is one whose interconnected nodes and links extend spatially across national boundaries and, in so doing, integrates parts of disparate national and subnational territories". GPN frameworks combines the insights from the global value chain analysis, actor–network theory and literature on Varieties of Capitalism. GPN provides a relational framework that aims to encompass all the relevant actors in the production systems. GPN framework provides analytical platform that relates sub-national regional development with clustering dynamics.

== Historical development of concept ==
In 1990s the concept of value chain gained its credit among economists and business scholars. (Its prominent developer Michael Porter). The concept combined sequenced and interconnected activities in the process of value creation. Value chain concept focused on business activities, but not on the corporate power and institutional context. In 1994 Garry Gereffi, together with Miguel Korzeniewicz introduced the concept of Global Commodity Chains (GCC):

sets of interorganizational networks clustered around one commodity or product, linking households, enterprises, and states to one another within the world-economy. These networks are situationally specific, socially constructed, and locally integrated, underscoring the social embeddedness of economic organization

— Gereffi

The concept was developed further by a number of authors that emphasized importance of chain governance in different commodities (e.g. automobiles, textile, electronics etc.)

At the beginning of 2000s a group of authors Jeffrey Henderson, Peter Dicken, Martin Hess, Neil Coe and Henry Wai-Chung Yeung, introduced GPN framework, that builds on the development of previous approaches to international production processes. At the same time it expands beyond the linearity of GCC approach to incorporate all kinds of network configuration. Adopting clear network perspective allows to embrace the complexity of multidimensional layers of production moving beyond the "linear progression of the product or service"

== Insights from the analysis of production networks ==
Analysis of the global production networks relies on the use of the input-output tables that links firms through the transactions involved in the product creation. Commodity chain literature considers firms as the nodes in a number of chains that transform inputs into outputs through a series of interconnected stages of production, later linked to distribution and consumption activities. Andersen and Christensen define five major types of connective nodes in supply networks: Local integrator, Export base, Import base, International spanner and Global integrator Hobday et al. argue that the core capability of the firms stem from their ability to manage network of components and subsystem suppliers.

To capture both vertical and horizontal links across the sequence of production process, Lazzarini introduced the concept of Netchain: "a set of networks comprised of horizontal ties between firms within a particular industry or group, which are sequentially arranged based on vertical ties between firms in different layers ... Netchain analysis explicitly differentiates between horizontal (transactions in the same layer) and vertical ties (transactions between layers), mapping how agents in each layer are related to each other and to agents in other layers". Critical studies have explored production networks in the domain of ethics of production, for instance focusing on local effects or labor relations.
