= Rural development =

Improving quality of life in rural areas

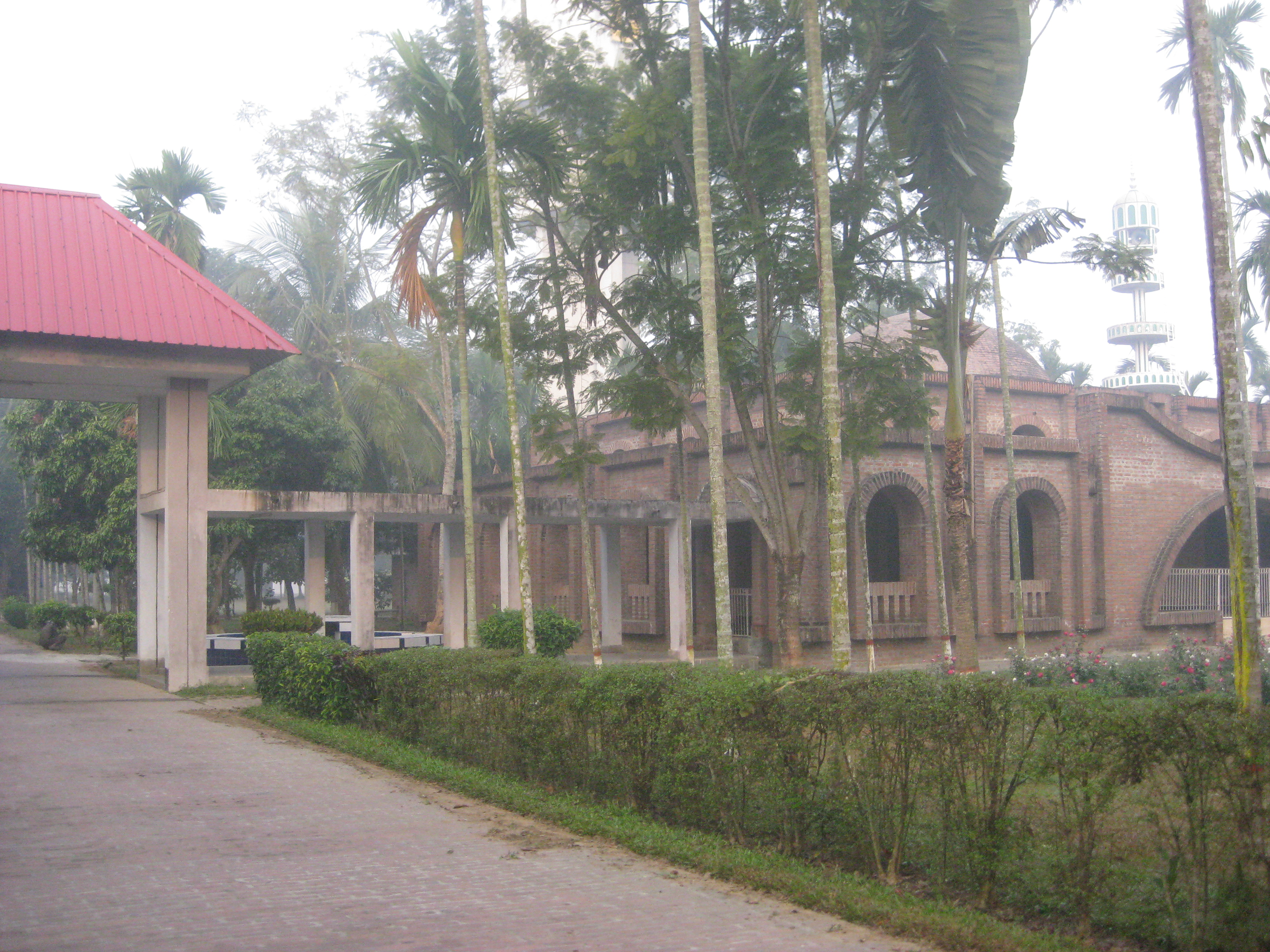
A rural development academy in Bogra, Bangladesh. Many government and non-governmental agencies invest in capacity building and opportunities for rural communities to gain greater access to economic opportunities.

Rural development is the process of improving the quality of life and economic well-being of people living in rural areas, often relatively isolated and sparsely populated areas. Often, rural regions have experienced rural poverty, poverty greater than urban or suburban economic regions due to lack of access to economic activities, and lack of investments in key infrastructure such as education.

Rural development has traditionally centered on the exploitation of land-intensive natural resources such as agriculture and forestry. However, changes in global production networks and increased urbanization have changed the character of rural areas. Increasingly rural tourism, niche manufacturers, and recreation have replaced resource extraction and agriculture as dominant economic drivers. The need for rural communities to approach development from a wider perspective has created more focus on a broad range of development goals rather than merely creating incentive for agricultural or resource-based businesses.

Education, entrepreneurship, physical infrastructure, and social infrastructure all play an important role in developing rural regions. Rural development is also characterized by its emphasis on locally produced economic development strategies. In contrast to urban regions, which have many similarities, rural areas are highly distinctive from one another. For this reason there are a large variety of rural development approaches used globally.

== Rural poverty ==
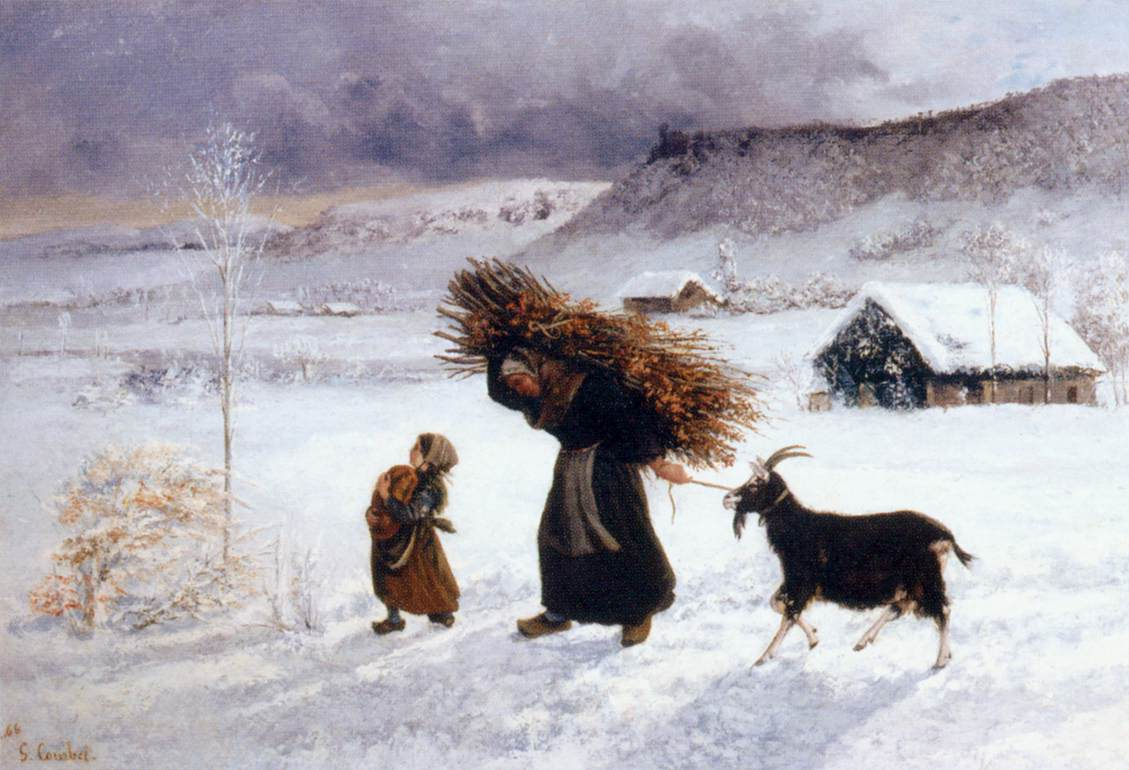
Gustave Courbet depicted nineteenth century rural poverty in this painting.

Rural poverty refers to situations where people living in non-urban regions are in a state or condition of lacking the financial resources and essentials for living. It takes account of factors of rural society, rural economy, and political systems that give rise to the marginalization and economic disadvantage found there. Rural areas, because of their small, spread-out populations, typically have less well maintained infrastructure and a harder time accessing markets, which tend to be concentrated in population centers.

Rural communities also face disadvantages in terms of legal and social protections, with women and marginalized communities frequently having a harder time accessing land, education and other support systems that help with economic development. Several policies have been tested in both developing and developed economies, including rural electrification and access to other technologies such as internet, gender parity, and improved access to credit and income.

In academic studies, rural poverty is often discussed in conjunction with spatial inequality, which in this context refers to the inequality between urban and rural areas. Both rural poverty and spatial inequality are global phenomena, but like poverty in general, there are higher rates of rural poverty in developing countries than in developed countries.

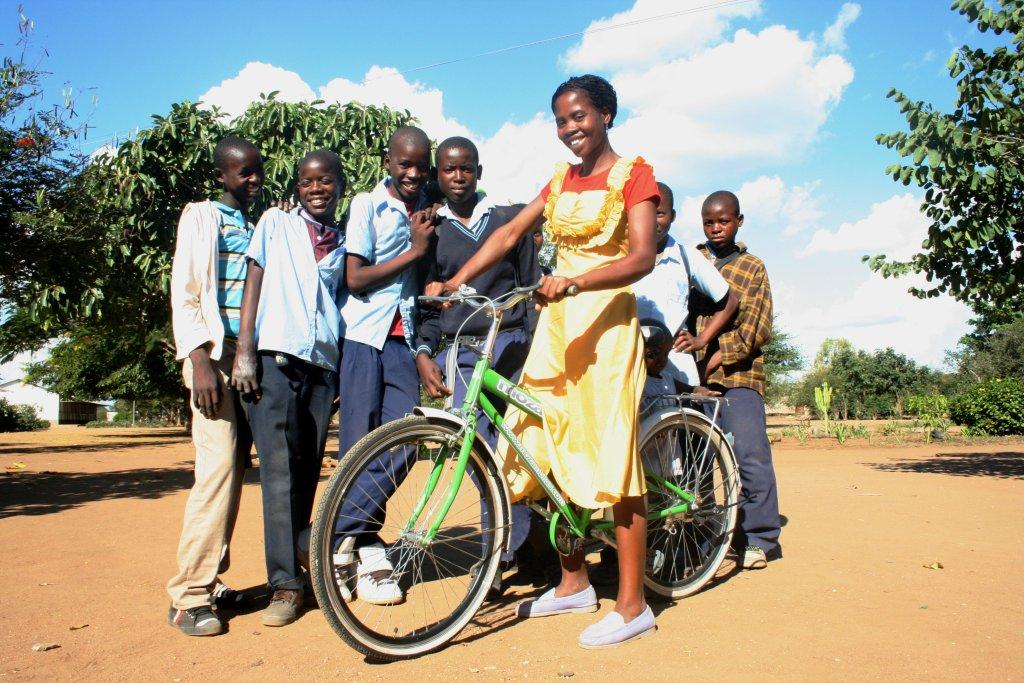
Many parts of rural Africa, such as this community in Mozambique, experience rural poverty. This woman was given access to a bicycle through a rural development program through a Bicycle poverty reduction program. Access to affordable transportation has been a key part of gaining access to greater economic mobility in many parts of the world. For example, distributing bicycles was one of the key strategies used by China to reduce rural poverty in the 20th century.

Eradicating rural poverty through effective policies and economic growth is a continuing difficulty for the international community, as it invests in rural development. According to the International Fund for Agricultural Development, 70 percent of the people in extreme poverty are in rural areas, most of whom are smallholders or agricultural workers whose livelihoods are heavily dependent on agriculture. These food systems are vulnerable to extreme weather, which is expected to affect agricultural systems the world over more as climate change increases.

Thus the climate crisis is expected to reduce the effectiveness of programs reducing rural poverty and cause displacement of rural communities to urban centers. Sustainable Development Goal 1: No Poverty sets international goals to address these issues, and is deeply connected with investments in a sustainable food system as part of Sustainable Development Goal 2: Zero Hunger.

== Approaches to development ==
Rural development actions are intended to further the social and economic development of rural communities.

Rural development programs were historically top-down approaches from local or regional authorities, regional development agencies, NGOs, national governments or international development organizations. However, a critical 'organization gap' identified during the late 1960s, reflecting on the disjunction between national organizations and rural communities led to a great focus on community participation in rural development agendas. Oftentimes this was achieved through political decentralization policies in developing countries, particularly popular among African countries, or policies that shift the power of socio-politic-economic decision-making and the election of representatives and leadership from centralized governments to local governments. As a result, local populations can also bring about endogenous initiatives for land development. The term rural development is not limited to issues of developing countries. In fact many developed countries have very active rural development programs.

Rural development aims at finding ways to improve rural lives with the participation of rural people themselves, so as to meet the required needs of rural communities. The outsider may not understand the setting, culture, language and other things prevalent in the local area. As such, rural people themselves have to participate in their sustainable rural development. In developing countries like Nepal, Pakistan, India, Bangladesh, integrated development approaches are being followed up. In this context, many approaches and ideas have been developed and implemented, for instance, bottom-up approaches, PRA- Participatory Rural Appraisal, RRA- Rapid Rural Appraisal, and Working With People (WWP). The New Rural Reconstruction Movement in China has been actively promoting rural development through their ecological farming projects.

=== The role of NGOs/non-profits in developing countries ===
Because decentralization policies made development problems the responsibility of local governments, it also opened the door for non-governmental organizations (NGOs), nonprofits, and other foreign actors to become more involved in the approach to these issues. For example, the elimination of statist approaches to development caused an exponential increase in the number of NGOs active in Africa, and additionally caused them to take on increasingly important roles. Consequently, nonprofits and NGOs are also greatly involved in the provisioning of needs in developing countries and they play an increasingly large role in supporting rural development.

These organizations are often criticized for taking over responsibilities that are traditionally carried out by the state, causing governments to become ineffective in handling these responsibilities over time. Within Africa, NGOs carry out the majority of sustainable building and construction through donor-funded, low-income housing projects. Furthermore, they are often faulted for being easily controlled by donor money and oriented to serve the needs of local elites above the rest of the population. As a result of this critique, many NGOs have started to include strategies in their projects that promote community participation.

Many scholars argue that NGOs are an insufficient solution to a lack of development leadership as a result of decentralization policies. Human rights expert Susan Dicklitch points to the historical context of colonialism, organization-specific limitations, and regime restraints as hindrances to the promises of NGOs. She notes that "NGOs are increasingly relegated to service provision and gap-filling activities as by the retreating state, but those supportive functions are not matched with increased political efficacy".

== International examples ==
=== Uganda ===
In Uganda specifically, several mid-century centrist administrations, particularly the regimes of Idi Amin (1971–1979) and Milton Obote (1981–1986), described as brutal and ineffective led to a sharp drop in responsiveness to citizen's needs between 1966 and 1986. As a result of these administrations, several constraints were placed on local governments that prevented effective development initiatives: every single employee in local governments had to be appointed by the president, all local budgets and bylaws had to be approved by the Minister of Local Government, and this Minister could dissolve any local government council.

Because of the several shortcomings of the dictatorial government in promoting the participation of citizens in local development efforts, a decentralization campaign was officially launched in Uganda in 1992, with its legislative culmination occurring in 1997 with the passing of the Local Governments Act. This act led to the transfer of power to local governments in an attempt to encourage citizen participation and further rural development. Regarding funding under the decentralization structure, local governments receive a majority of their funds in block grants from the national government, mostly as conditional grants but with some unconditional and equalization grants administered as well. Furthermore, local governments were given the power to collect taxes from their constituents, however, this usually only accounts for less than 10 percent of the local government's budget.

==== Debates in decentralization efforts ====
Some scholars express concern that decentralization efforts in Uganda may not actually be leading to an increase in participation and development. For example, despite increases over the years in local councils and civil society organizations (CSOs) in rural Uganda, efforts are consistently undermined by a lacking socio-economic structure leading to high rates of illiteracy, poor agricultural techniques, market access, and transportation systems. These shortcomings are often a result of taxes and payments imposed by local authorities and administration agents that inhibit farmers' access to larger markets. Furthermore, the overall financial strength of local governments is considerably weaker than that of the national government, which adversely affects their responsiveness to the needs of their citizens and success in increasing participation in community development initiatives. Finally, civil society organizations are often ineffective in practice at mobilizing for the community's interests. Umar Kakumba, a scholar at Makerere University in Uganda, notes of CSOs:

The CSOs' inability to effectively mobilize for and represent the local community's interests is linked to the disabling regulatory environment with cumbersome and elaborate procedures for registration and restrictions on what constitutes allowable advocacy activities; their desire to complement the work of government rather than questioning it; the difficulties in raising adequate resources from their membership; the inability to exercise internal democracy and accountability; the urban/elite orientation of most NGOs; and the donor funding that encourages a number of CSOs to emerge in order to clinch a share of the donor monies.

=== Nigeria ===
Since independence, several rural development and extension education programs have been implemented in Nigeria.

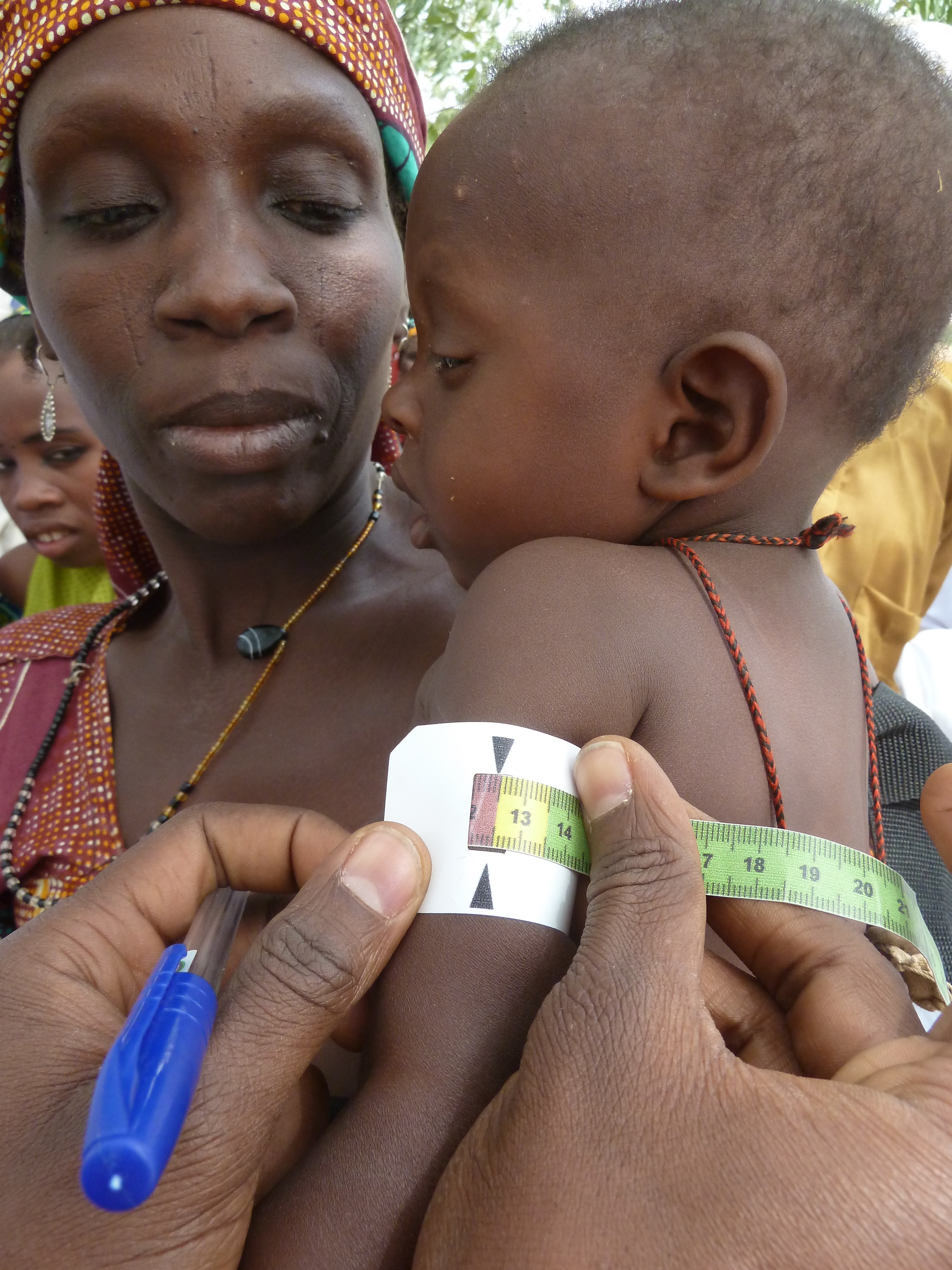
A child is checked for signs of malnutrition in Katsina State, Nigeria, March 2011

In Nigeria, several subsequent governments have implemented different policies in an attempt to develop the rural areas and alleviate the poverty rate that has become a prominent decadence in such areas. However, very little success has been recorded so far.

== Rural development agencies ==
In many countries, the national and subnational government delegates rural development to agencies and support centers.

=== List of agencies ===
- International Institute of Rural Reconstruction
- Technical Centre for Agricultural and Rural Cooperation ACP-EU (CTA) Agricultural and rural information provider
- USDA Rural Development, an agency of the United States Department of Agriculture
- European Agricultural Fund for Rural Development, a part of the Common Agricultural Policy by the European Commission's Directorate-General for Agriculture and Rural Development
- England Rural Development Programme by DEFRA
- Agricultural Development & Training Society, India
- Ministry of Villages, Development of Disadvantaged Regions, and Transmigration, Indonesia
- Tipperary Institute, Ireland
- Azerbaijan Rural Investment Project in Azerbaijan
- Nimbkar Agricultural Research Institute, India
- Philippine Rural Reconstruction Movement, Philippines

== See also ==
- Comilla Project, the first comprehensive rural development project in developing countries
- Development studies
- District Rural Development Agencies (India)
- International Fund for Agricultural Development (IFAD)
- Regional development
- RIGA Project
- Rural flight
- Rural sociology
- Rural management
- Social policy and Economic policy
- Urban development
