= RIGA Project =

Organization

Rural Income Generating Activities Activités Rurales Génératrices de Revenus Actividades Generadoras de Ingreso Rural
- Abbreviation: RIGA
- Formation: 2005
- Type: Research Project
- Headquarters: Rome, Italy
- Head: Alberto Zezza (Team Leader)
- Parent organization: Food and Agriculture Organization of the United Nations
- Website: http://www.fao.org/es/ESA/riga/english/index_en.htm

The Rural Income Generating Activities (RIGA) Project is a collaboration between the Food and Agriculture Organization, the World Bank, and American University (Washington, DC) that seeks to contribute to the understanding of the income generating activities, both agricultural and non-agricultural, of rural households in developing countries. The RIGA project achieves this by two means. First, through the development of an innovative database of income sources from various developing countries, which is available free of charge to researchers via the project’s website. Second, by producing studies and publications that use the database to analyze pressing economic and policy issues.

== Purpose ==
The RIGA Project's purpose is to create an income measure that is comparable within and between countries.

The RIGA Project Logo

According to the RIGA Project website, the key questions addressed by the RIGA Project include:

- What are the relationships between the various Rural Income Generating Activities (RIGAs)?
- What types of RIGAs are associated with poverty reduction?
- What is the relationship between various Rural Non-Farm activities and agriculture?
- What is the link between RIGAs and food security?

In order to answer these questions, the RIGA Project developed a standardized income calculation method that is applied only to country surveys that meet strict criteria of data requirements. The definition of income utilized closely adheres to the one set out by the International Labour Organization. The "Resolution Concerning Household Income and Expenditure Statistics" passed by ILO outlines that household income includes all monetary and in-kind receipts that a household receives, which should include income from wage employment, self-employment, property, own consumption of household goods, and both public and private transfers. Since agriculture remains the principal activity for rural households, the RIGA Project also considers income generated from on-farm activities, both those sold and consumed by the household.

== History ==
The need for standardized income data has arisen from the desire of the development community to understand the economic activities of rural households, especially the rural non-farm activities that have been continually overlooked even as the importance of the rural non-farm economy increases. With this in mind, the RIGA Project was initiated as a collaboration between the Food and Agriculture Organization, the World Bank, and American University (Washington, DC). Only after consultation on the methodology between the partners, did the analysis and compilation of the data begin in 2005. Since 2005, the RIGA Project has created income aggregates for almost 30 countries, which became available to the public, free of charge, with the launch of the website in April 2009. The work of the Project has continued to expand with the addition of RIGA-L. The RIGA-Labor data provides a more in-depth look into the wage employment element of income generating activities, with analysis possible both at the individual and job level.

== Data ==
The database contains an increasing number of surveys from countries in Africa, Asia, Eastern Europe and Latin America. Some of the countries have surveys for multiple years, with some of the multi-year countries (e.g. Indonesia, Nepal, Nicaragua, and Vietnam) including panel datasets.

=== Africa ===
Ghana - Ghana Living Standards Survey 1992

Ghana - Ghana Living Standards Survey 1998

Kenya - Integrated Household Budget Survey 2004-2005

Madagascar - Enquête Permanente Auprès Des Ménages 1993-1994

Madagascar - Enquête Permanente Auprès Des Ménages 2000-2001

Malawi - Integrated Household Survey II 2004-2005

Nigeria - Living Standards Survey 2003-2004

=== Asia ===
Bangladesh - Household Income-Expenditure Survey 2000

Indonesia - Family Life Survey- Wave 1 1993

Indonesia - Family Life Survey- Wave 3 2000

Nepal - Living Standards Survey I 1995-1996

Nepal - Living Standards Survey II 2003-2004

Pakistan -Integrated Household Survey 1991

Pakistan -Integrated Household Survey 2001

Vietnam - Living Standards Survey 1992-1993

Vietnam - Living Standards Survey 1997-1998

Vietnam - Living Standards Survey 2002

=== Eastern Europe and Central Asia ===
Albania - Living Standards Measurement Survey 2002

Albania - Living Standards Measurement Survey 2005

Bulgaria - Integrated Household Survey 1995

Bulgaria - Integrated Household Survey 2001

Tajikistan - Living Standards Survey - 2003

=== Latin America ===
Ecuador - Estudio de Condiciones de Vida 1995

Ecuador - Estudio de Condiciones de Vida 1998

Guatemala - Encuesta de Condiciones de Vida 2000

Nicaragua - Encuesta Nacional de Hogares Sobre Medición de Niveles de Vida 1998

Nicaragua - Encuesta Nacional de Hogares Sobre Medición de Niveles de Vida 2001

Panama - Encuesta de Niveles de Vida 1997

Panama - Encuesta de Niveles de Vida 2003

- Survey list as of March 2010

== Publications ==
A Cross Country Comparison of Rural Income Generating Activities January 2010 World Development. B. Davis, P. Winters, G. Carletto, K. Covarrubias, E.J. Quiñones, A. Zezza, C. Azzarri, K. Stamoulis and S. DiGiuseppe.

Assets, Activities and Rural Income Generation: Evidence from a Multicountry Analysis. July 2009 P. Winters, B. Davis, G. Carletto, K. Covarrubias, E.J. Quiñones, A. Zezza, C. Azzarri, and K. Stamoulis.

Rural Income Generating Activities: Whatever Happened to the Institutional Vacuum? Evidence from Ghana, Guatemala, Nicaragua and Vietnam July 2009 A. Zezza, G. Carletto, B. Davis, K. Stamoulis and P. Winters.

Wage inequality in international perspective: Effects of location, sector, and gender. March 2009 T. Hertz, P. Winters, A. P. de la O, E. Quiñones, B. Davis, A. Zezza

Accounting for the Diversity of Rural Income Sources in Developing Countries: The Experience of the Rural Income Generating Activities Project June 2009 K. Covarrubias, A.P. de la O Campos, and A. Zezza

A Profile of the Rural Poor April 2009 A. Valdés, W. Foster, G. Anríquez, C. Azzarri, K. Covarrubias, B. Davis, S. DiGiuseppe, T. Essam, T. Hertz, A.P. de la O, E. Quiñones, K. Stamoulis, P. Winters and A. Zezza

Assets, Activities and Rural Poverty Alleviation: Evidence from a Multicountry Analysis January 2009 P. Winters, B. Davis, G. Carletto, K.Covarrubias, K.Stamoulis, E. Quiñones, and A. Zezza

A Cross Country Comparison of Rural Income Generating Activities January 2009 B. Davis, P. Winters, G. Carletto, K. Covarrubias, E. Quiñones, A. Zezza, K. Stamoulis, and S. Di Giuseppe

Patterns of Rural Development: A Cross-Country Comparison Using Microeconomic Data August 2008 P. Winters, T. Essam, B. Davis, A. Zezza, G. Carletto, and K. Stamoulis

Rural Wage Employment in Developing Countries August 2008 P. Winters, A.P. de la O, E. Quiñones, T. Hertz, B. Davis, A Zezza, K. Covarrubias, and K. Stamoulis

The Impact of Rising Food Prices on the Poor August 2008 A. Zezza, B. Davis, C. Azzarri, K. Covarrubias, L. Tasciotti, and G. Anr¡quez

Rural Household Access to Assets and Agrarian Institutions: A Cross Country Comparison March 2008 A. Zezza, P. Winters, B. Davis, G. Carletto, K. Covarrubias, E. Quiñones, K. Stamoulis, L. Tasciotti, and S. Di Giuseppe

Does Urban Agriculture Enhance Dietary Diversity? Empirical Evidence from a Sample of Developing Countries March 2008 (report short version) A. Zezza and L. Tasciotti

Rural income generating activities in developing countries:re-assessing the evidence 2007 (powerpoint presentation) G. Carletto, K. Covarrubias, B. Davis, M. Krausova, K. Stamoulis, P. Winters and A. Zezza

Rural Income Generating Activities: Whatever Happened to the Institutional Vacuum? Evidence from Ghana, Guatemala, Nicaragua and Vietnam November 2007 A. Zezza, G. Carletto, B. Davis, K. Stamoulis and P. Winters

Rural Income Generating Activities Study: Methodological note on the construction of income aggregates October 2007. G. Carletto, K. Covarrubias, B. Davis, M. Krausova and P. Winters

Rural Household Access to Assets and Agrarian Institutions: A Cross Country Comparison May 2007 A. Zezza, P. Winters, B. Davis, G. Carletto, K. Covarrubias, E. Quiñones, K. Stamoulis, T. Karfakis, L. Tasciotti, S. DiGiuseppe and G. Bonomi

Rural Income Generating Activities: A Cross Country Comparison May 2007 B. Davis, P. Winters, G. Carletto, K. Covarrubias, E. Quiñones, A. Zezza, K. Stamoulis, G. Bonomi and S. DiGiuseppe
