= List of cicadas of Australia =

The list scope includes outlying islands: 1. Cocos (Keeling) Islands; 2. Christmas Island; 3. Ashmore Reef; 4. Torres Strait Islands; 5. Lord Howe Island; 6. Norfolk Island; 7. Macquarie Island; 8. Heard Island and McDonald Islands

This is a list of the cicadas found in Australia including its outlying islands and territories. The outlying islands covered include: Christmas, Cocos (Keeling), Ashmore, Torres Strait, Coral Sea, Lord Howe, Norfolk, Macquarie, and Heard/McDonald.

The taxonomy followed is from Moulds 2012, Marshall 2018, and Popple 2018.

== Family Cicadidae Latreille, 1802 ==
=== Subfamily Cicadinae Latreille, 1802 ===
==== Tribe Burbungini Moulds, 2005 ====
Genus Burbunga Distant, 1905

- Burbunga albofasciata Distant, 1907 (Pale Bark Cicada)
- Burbunga aterrima (Distant, 1914) (Western Screamer)
- Burbunga gilmorei (Distant, 1882) (Western Bark Cicada)
- Burbunga hillieri (Distant, 1907) (Desert Screamer)
- Burbunga inornata Distant, 1905 (Western Screamer)
- Burbunga mouldsi Olive, 2012 (Mareeba Bark Cicada)
- Burbunga nanda (Burns, 1964) (Charcoal Screamer)
- Burbunga nigrosignata (Distant 1904) (Floury Bark Cicada)
- Burbunga occidentalis (Distant, 1912) (South-western Whiner)
- Burbunga parva Moulds, 1994 (Small Northern Bark Cicada)
- Burbunga queenslandica Moulds, 1994 (Queensland Bark Cicada)

==== Tribe Cicadini Latreille ====
Genus Diceropyga Stål, 1870

- Diceropyga subapicalis (Walker, 1868) (Australian Dicer)

==== Tribe Cryptotympanini Handlirsch, 1925 ====
Genus Anapsaltoda Ashton, 1921

- Anapsaltoda cowanae Moulds & Popple, 2023 (Green Emperor)
- Anapsaltoda pulchra Ashton, 1921 (Golden Emperor)

Genus Arenopsaltria Ashton, 1921 (Sandgrinders)

- Arenopsaltria dryas Moulds & Marshall, 2025
- Arenopsaltria exmouthensis Moulds & Marshall, 2025
- Arenopsaltria fullo (Walker, 1850) (Sandgrinder)
- Arenopsaltria nubivena (Walker, 1858) (Eastern Sandgrinder)
- Arenopsaltria pygmaea (Distant, 1904) (Pygmy Sandgrinder)

Genus Henicopsaltria Stål, 1866

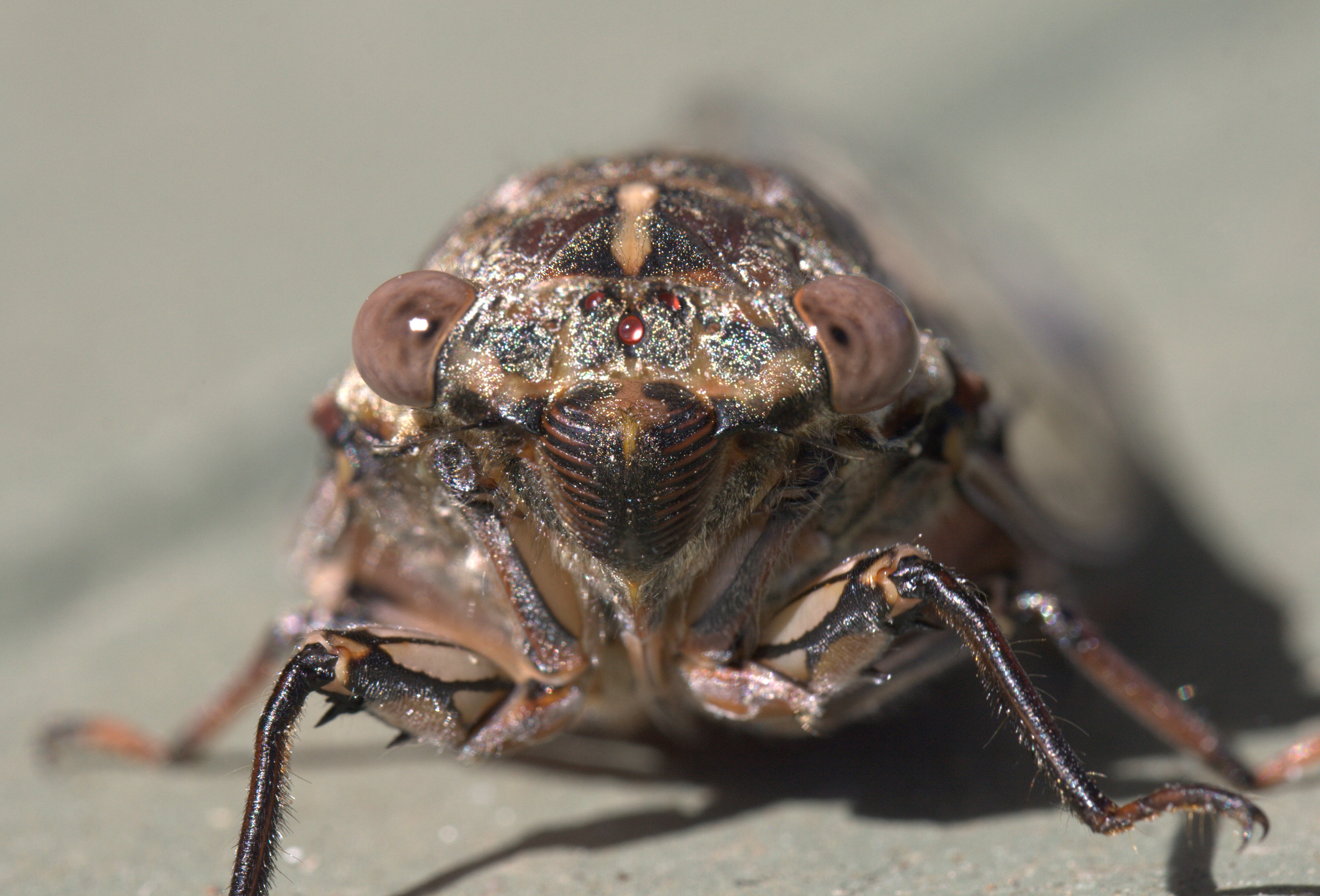
Henicopsaltria eydouxii

- Henicopsaltria danielsi Moulds, 1993 (McIvor River Grinder)
- Henicopsaltria eydouxii (Guérin-Méneville, 1838) (Razor Grinder)
- Henicopsaltria kelsalli Distant, 1910 (Cape York Grinder)
- Henicopsaltria rufivelum Moulds, 1978 (Jungle Grinder)

Genus Neopsaltoda Distant, 1910

- Neopsaltoda crassa Distant, 1910 (Dark Knight)

Genus Psaltoda Stål, 1861

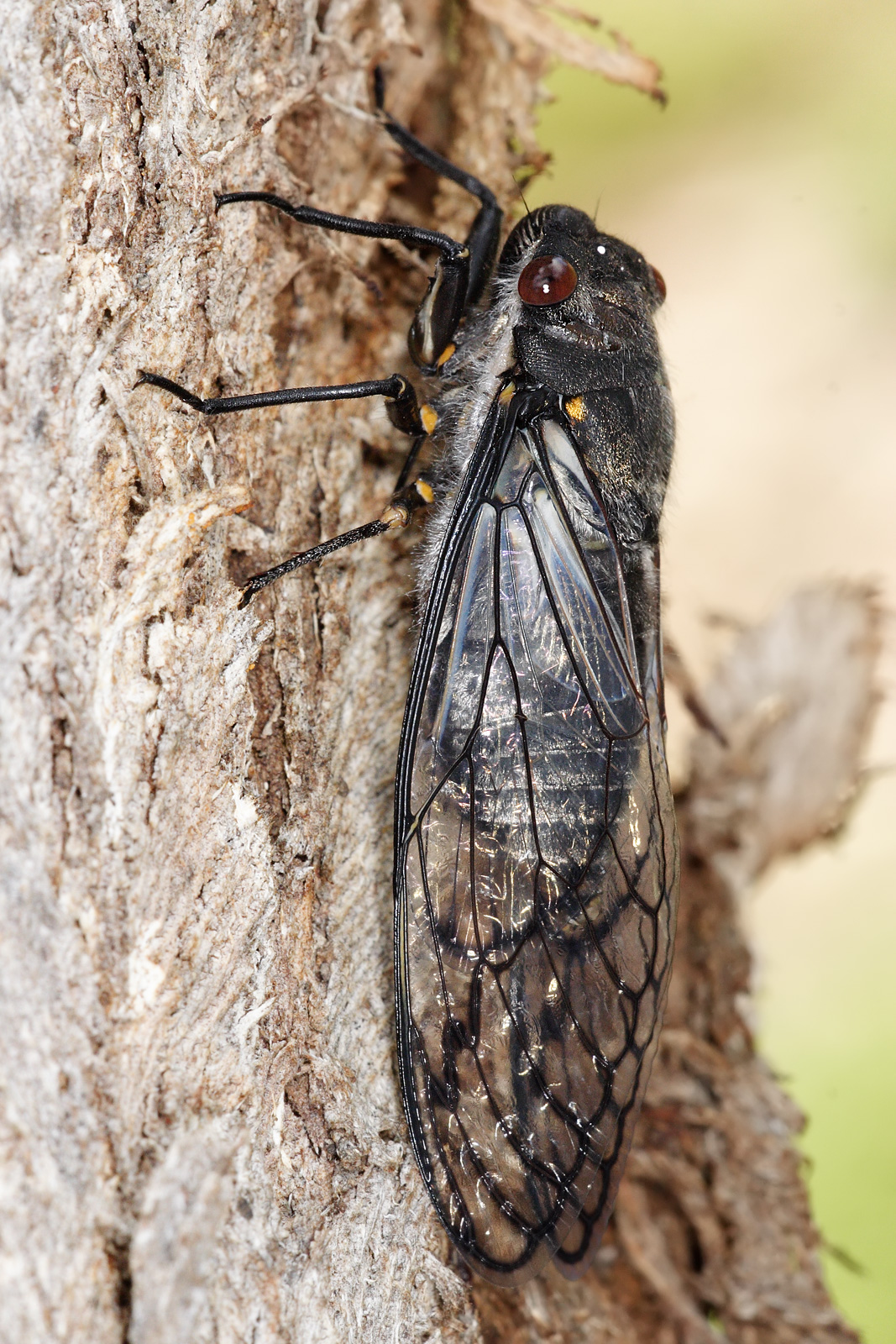
Psaltoda moerens

- Psaltoda adonis Ashton, 1914 (Forest Demon)
- Psaltoda antennetta Moulds, 2002 (Clubbed Sage)
- Psaltoda aurora Distant, 1881 (Red Roarer)
- Psaltoda brachypennis Moss and Moulds, 2000 (Phantom Knight)
- Psaltoda claripennis Ashton, 1921 (Clanger)
- Psaltoda flavescens Distant, 1892 (Golden Knight)
- Psaltoda fumipennis Ashton, 1912 (Smoky Sage)
- Psaltoda harrisii (Leach, 1814) (Yellowbelly)
- Psaltoda insularis Ashton, 1914 (Lord Howe Island Cicada)
- Psaltoda maccallumi Moulds, 2002 (Dark Sage)
- Psaltoda magnifica Moulds, 1984 (Green Baron)
- Psaltoda moerens (Germar, 1834) (Redeye)
- Psaltoda mossi Moulds, 2002 (Little Baron)
- Psaltoda pictibasis (Walker, 1858) (Black Friday)
- Psaltoda plaga (Walker, 1850) (Silver Knight)

==== Tribe Cyclochilini Distant, 1904 ====
Genus Cyclochila Amyot & Serville, 1843

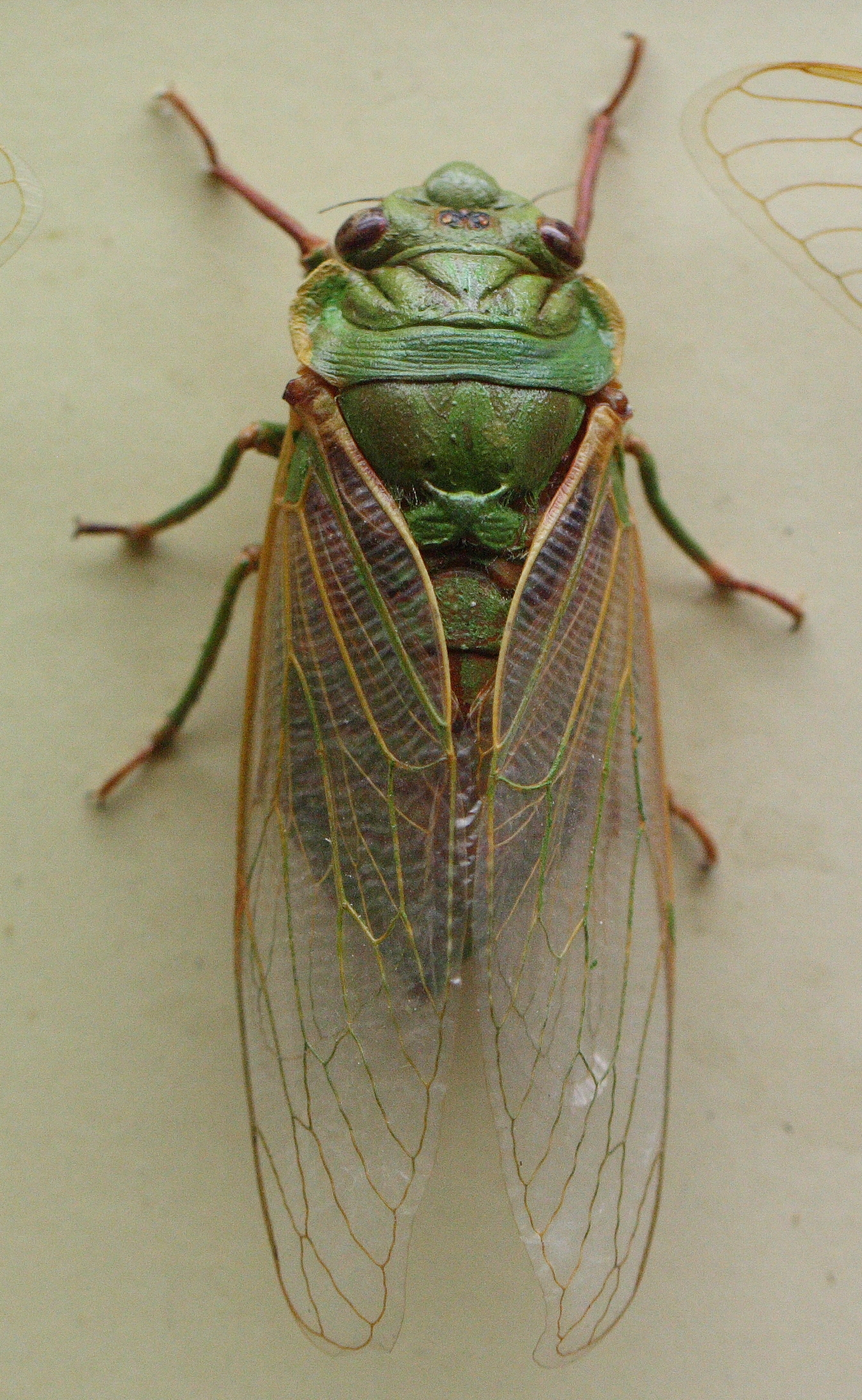
Cyclochila australasiae, Greengrocer

- Cyclochila australasiae (Donovan, 1805) (Greengrocer, Masked Devil, Yellow Monday)
- Cyclochila virens Distant, 1906 (Northern Greengrocer)

==== Tribe Jassopsaltriini Moulds, 2005 ====
Genus Jassopsaltria Ashton, 1914

- Jassopsaltria aeroides Moulds & Marshall, 2021 (Shark Bay Fizzer)
- Jassopsaltria cinnamomea Moulds & Marshall, 2021 (Red Bluff Fizzer)
- Jassopsaltria danielsorum Moulds & Marshall, 2021 (Keep River Fizzer)
- Jassopsaltria gracilens Moulds & Marshall, 2021 (Caramel Fizzer)
- Jassopsaltria minilyaensis Moulds & Marshall, 2021 (Minilya Fizzer)
- Jassopsaltria rufifacies Ashton, 1914 (Green Fizzer)

==== Tribe Kimberpsaltriini Moulds, Marshall and Popple, 2021 ====
Genus Kimberpsaltria Moulds, Marshall and Popple, 2021

- Kimberpsaltria taenia Moulds, Marshall and Popple, 2021 (Kimberley Rattle-stripe)

==== Tribe Macrotristriini Moulds, 2018 ====
Genus Illyria Moulds, 1985

- Illyria australensis (Kirkaldy, 1909) (Semi-arid Rattler)
- Illyria burkei (Distant, 1882) (Rattler)
- Illyria hilli (Ashton, 1914) (Northern Rattler)
- Illyria ignis (Emery, Emery and Ong, 2022) (Kimberley Rattler)
- Illyria major Moulds, 1985 (Desert Rattler)
- Illyria viridis Moulds, 2022 (Green Rattler)

Genus Macrotristria Stål, 1870

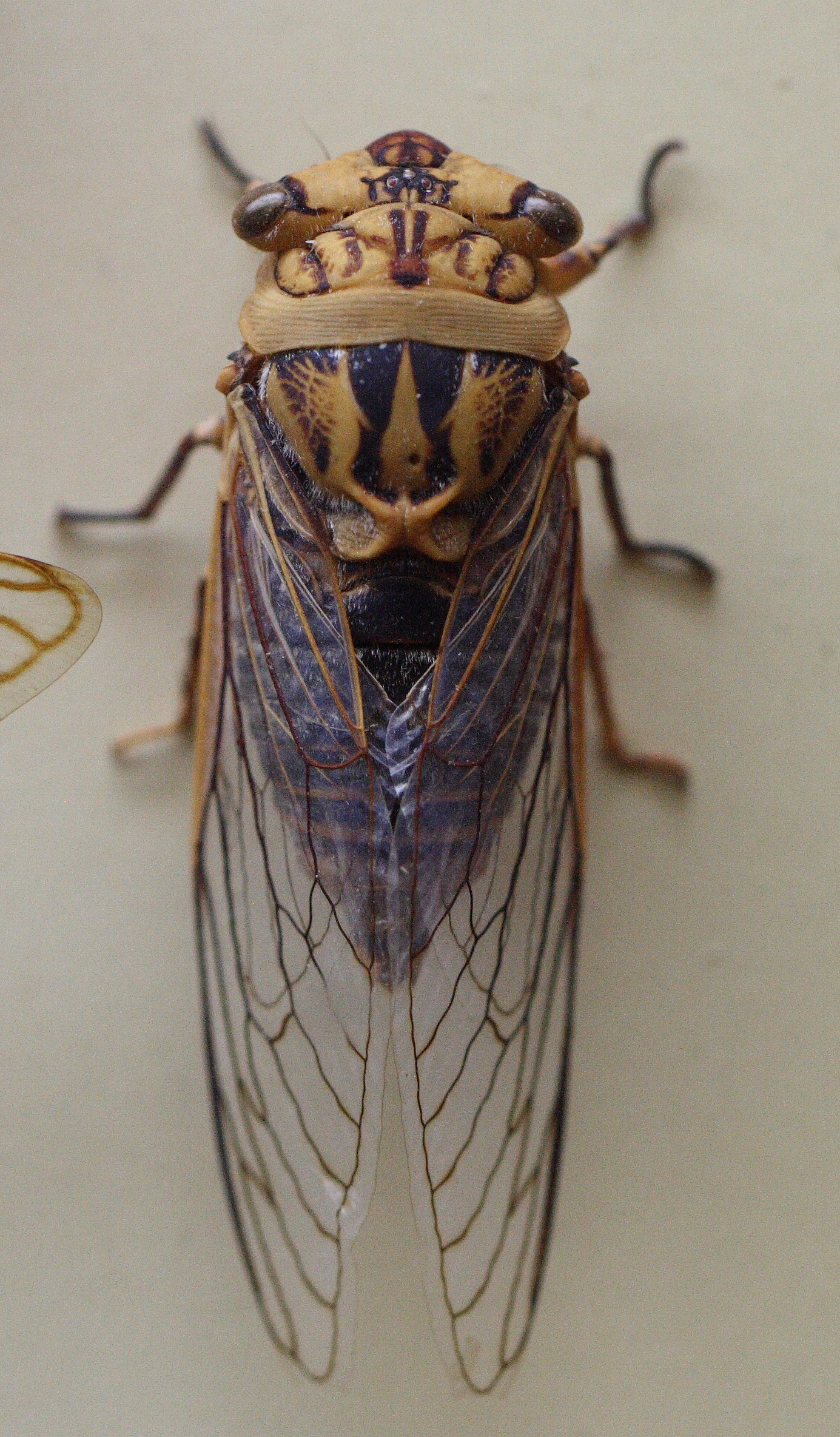
Macrotristria godingi

- Macrotristria angularis (Germar, 1834) (Cherrynose)
- Macrotristria bindalia Burns, 1964 (Corroboree Cicada)
- Macrotristria doddi Ashton, 1912 (Darwin Whiner)
- Macrotristria dorsalis Ashton, 1912 (Little Whiner)
- Macrotristria douglasi Burns, 1964 (Kimberley Whiner)
- Macrotristria extrema (Distant, 1892) (Western Whiner)
- Macrotristria frenchi (Distant, 1892) (Northern Steamer)
- Macrotristria godingi Distant, 1907 (Tiger Cherrynose)
- Macrotristria hieroglyphicalis (Kirkaldy, 1909) (Derby Whiner)
- Macrotristria intersecta (Walker, 1850) (Corroboree Cicada)
- Macrotristria kabikabia Burns, 1964 (Black Cherrynose)
- Macrotristria kulungura Burns, 1964 (Coastal Whiner)
- Macrotristria lachlani Moulds, 1992 (Far Northern Cherrynose)
- Macrotristria maculicollis Ashton, 1914 (False Cherrynose)
- Macrotristria stevewilsoni Popple, 2016 (Shoalwater Cherrynose)
- Macrotristria sylvara (Distant, 1901) (Green Cherrynose)
- Macrotristria thophoides Ashton, 1914 (False Drummer)
- Macrotristria vittata Moulds, 1992 (Cape York Cherrynose)
- Macrotristria worora Burns, 1964 (Kimberley Whiner)

==== Tribe Platypleurini Schmidt, 1918 ====
Genus Oxypleura Amyot & Serville, 1843

- Oxypleura calypso (Kirby, 1889) (Christmas Island Cicada)

==== Tribe Talcopsaltriini Moulds, 2008 ====
Genus Talcopsaltria Moulds, 2008

- Talcopsaltria olivei Moulds, 2008 (Tetradonta Cicada)

==== Tribe Tamasini Moulds, 2005 ====
Genus Parnkalla Distant, 1905

- Parnkalla muelleri (Distant, 1882) (Grass Faerie)

Genus Parnquila Moulds, 2012

- Parnquila hillieri (Distant, 1906) (Cane Grass Buzzer)
- Parnquila magna (Distant, 1913) (Goldfields Buzzer)
- Parnquila venosa (Distant, 1907) (Spinifex Buzzer)
- Parnquila unicolor (Ashton, 1921) (Perth Buzzer)

Genus Tamasa Distant, 1905

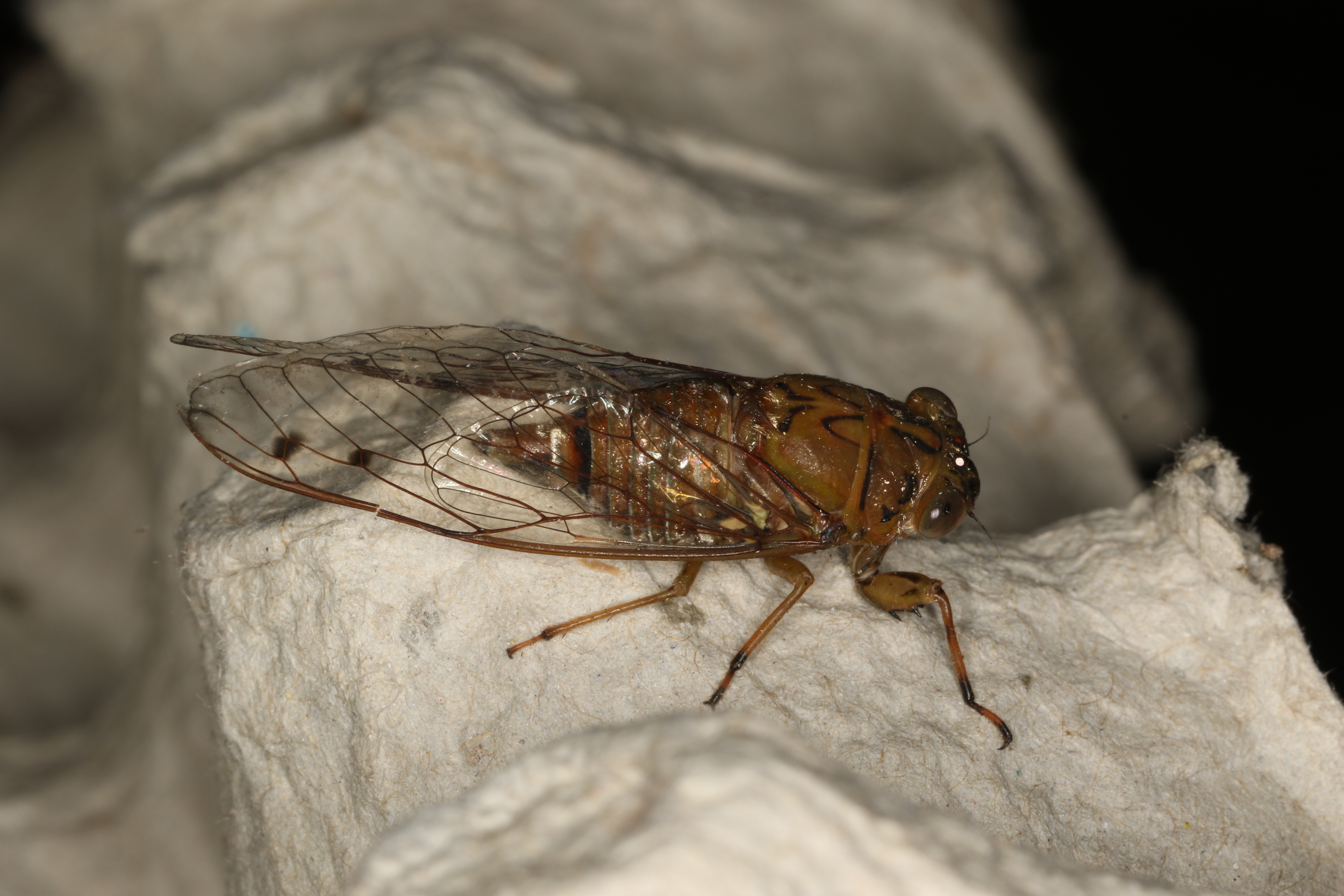
Tamasa tristigma

- Tamasa burgessi (Distant, 1905) (Two-toned Bunyip)
- Tamasa caverna Moulds and Olive, 2014 (Boulder Bunyip)
- Tamasa doddi (Goding and Froggatt, 1904) (Dodd's Bunyip)
- Tamasa rainbowi Ashton, 1912 (Green Bunyip)
- Tamasa tristigma (Germar, 1834) (Eastern Bunyip)

==== Tribe Thophini Distant, 1904 ====
Genus Arunta Distant, 1904

- Arunta interclusa (Walker, 1858) (Mangrove Drummer)
- Arunta perulata (Guérin-Méneville, 1831) (White Drummer)

Genus Thopha Amyot & Serville, 1843

- Thopha colorata Distant, 1907 (Orange Drummer)
- Thopha emmotti Moulds, 2001 (Desert Double Drummer)
- Thopha hutchinsoni Moulds, 2008 (North-western Double Drummer)
- Thopha saccata (Fabricius, 1803) (Eastern Double Drummer)
- Thopha sessiliba Distant, 1892 (Northern Double Drummer)

=== Subfamily Cicadettinae Buckton, 1889 ===
==== Tribe Cicadettini Buckton, 1889 ====
Genus Adelia Moulds, 2012

- Adelia borealis (Goding and Froggatt, 1904) (Broad-winged Tiger)

Genus Atrapsalta Owen & Moulds, 2016

- Atrapsalta audax Popple & Stolarski, 2024 (Adelaide Black Squeaker)
- Atrapsalta collina (Ewart, 1989) (Sandstone Squeaker)
- Atrapsalta corticina (Ewart, 1989) (Bark Squeaker)
- Atrapsalta dolens (Walker, 1850) (South-western Bark Squeaker)
- Atrapsalta emmotti (Owen & Moulds, 2016) (Channel Country Squeaker)
- Atrapsalta encaustica (Germar, 1834) (Black Squeaker)
- Atrapsalta furcilla Owen & Moulds, 2016 (Southern Mountain Squeaker)
- Atrapsalta fuscata (Ewart, 1989) (Small Bark Squeaker)
- Atrapsalta siccana (Ewart, 1989) (Bulloak Squeaker)
- Atrapsalta vinea Owen & Moulds, 2016 (Clare Valley Squeaker)

Genus Auscala Moulds, 2012

- Auscala flammea Emery, Emery & Hutchinson, 2020 (Red Mallee Creaker)
- Auscala spinosa (Goding & Froggatt, 1904) (Creaking Branch Cicada)

Genus Austropunia Moulds & Marshall, 2025

- Austropunia cheloides Moulds & Marshall, 2025 (Munjina Peeper)

Genus Birrima Distant, 1906

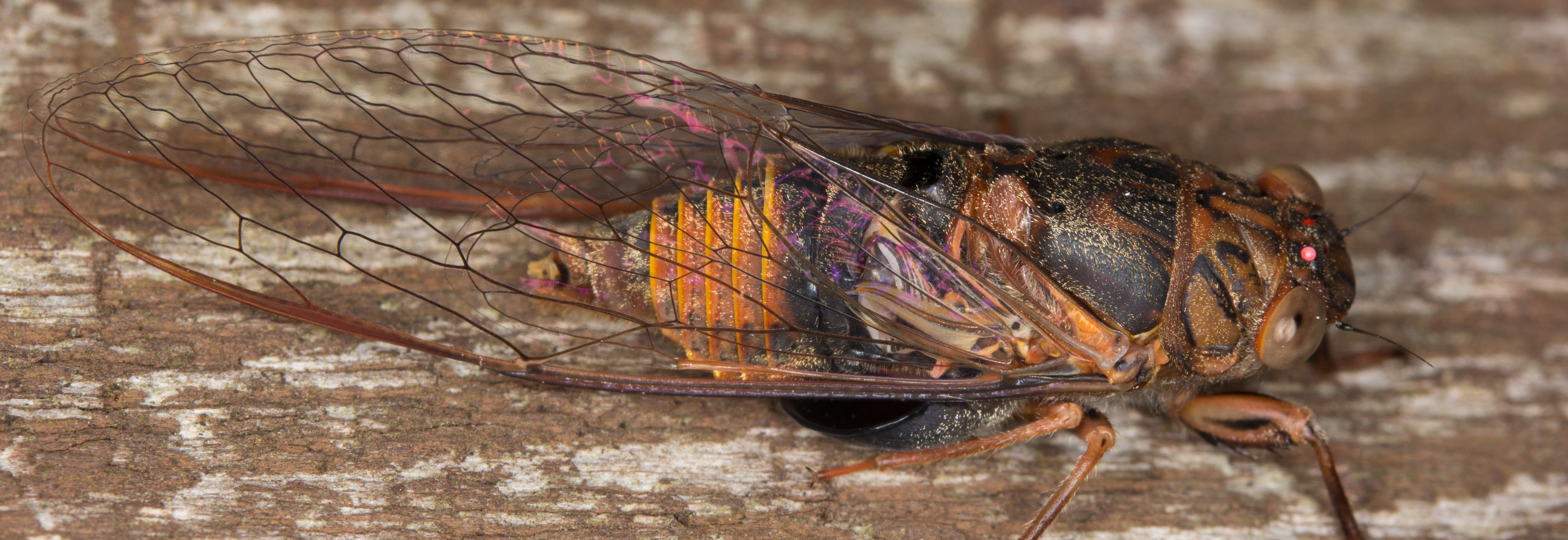
Birrima varians

- Birrima castanea (Goding & Froggatt, 1904) (Red Tree-ticker)
- Birrima varians (Germar, 1834) (Black Tree-ticker)

Genus Brevia Moulds & Marshall, 2025

- Brevia bullula Moulds & Marshall, 2025 (Grey Bubbler)

Genus Caliginopsalta Ewart, 2005

- Caliginopsalta percola Ewart, 2005 (Royal Casuarina Ticker)

Genus Calipsalta Moulds & Marshall, 2022

- Calipsalta brunnea Moulds & Marshall, 2022 (Brown Spinifex Rattler)
- Calipsalta fumosa Moulds & Marshall, 2022 (Pale Green Spinifex Rattler)
- Calipsalta viridans Moulds & Marshall, 2022 (Green Spinifex Rattler)

Genus Chelapsalta Moulds, 2012

- Chelapsalta puer (Walker, 1850) (Cassinia Cicada)
- Chelapsalta myoporae Ewart, Popple and Marshall, 2015 (Copper Shrub-buzzer)

Genus Clinata Moulds, 2012

- Clinata nodicosta (Goding & Froggatt, 1904) (Western Bent-winged Clicker)

Genus Clinopsalta Moulds, 2012

- Clinopsalta adelaida (Ashton, 1914) (Murray Acacia Cicada)
- Clinopsalta autumna Popple & Emery, 2017 (Ferny Acacia Cicada)
- Clinopsalta tigris (Ashton, 1914) (Small Acacia Cicada)
- Clinopsalta semilunata Popple & Emery, 2017 (Semilunata Cicada)

Genus Cognadanga Moulds & Marshall, 2025

- Cognadanga capricornica Moulds & Marshall, 2025 (Asphalt Cicada)
- Cognadanga isos Moulds & Marshall, 2025 (Woomera Urchip)

Genus Crotopsalta Ewart, 2005

- Crotopsalta fronsecetes Ewart, 2005 (Eastern Ticker)
- Crotopsalta plexis Ewart, 2005 (Wilga Ticker)
- Crotopsalta strenulum Ewart, 2005 (Rapid Ticker)
- Crotopsalta poaecetes Ewart, 2005 (Cloncurry Ticker)
- Crotopsalta leptotigris Ewart, 2009 (Cravens Peak Ticker)

Genus Diemeniana Distant, 1905

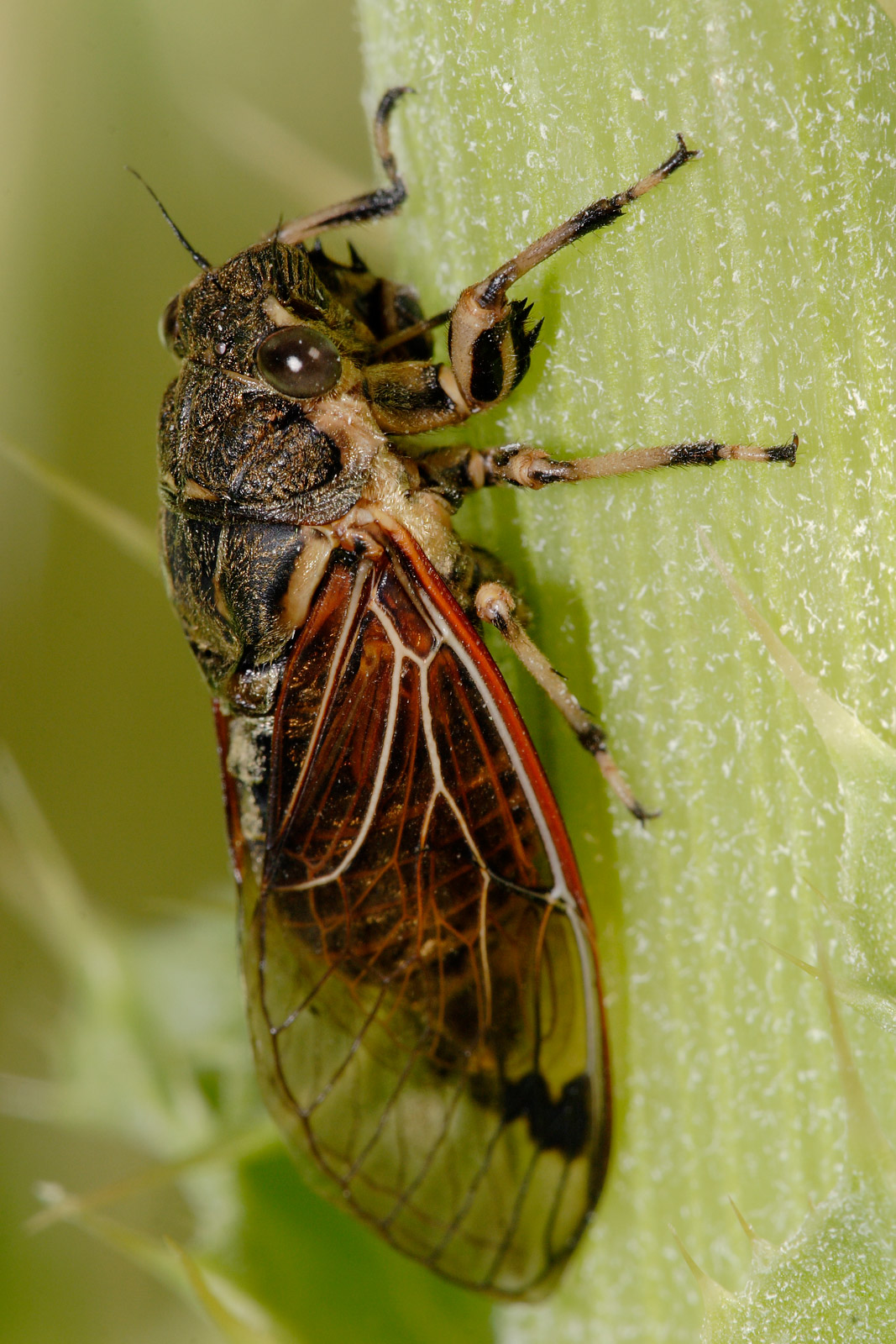
Diemeniana frenchi

- Diemeniana cincta (Fabricius, 1803) (Tasman Twanger)
- Diemeniana euronotiana (Kirkaldy, 1909) (Golden Twanger)
- Diemeniana frenchi (Distant, 1907) (Crop Duster)
- Diemeniana hirsuta (Goding & Froggatt, 1904) (Black Twanger)
- Diemeniana neboissi Burns, 1958 (Auburn Crop Duster)

Genus Dipsopsalta Moulds, 2012

- Dipsopsalta signata (Distant, 1914) (Desert Grass-buzzer)

Genus Drymopsalta Ewart, 2005

- Drymopsalta acrotela Ewart & Popple, 2013 (Top End Heath-buzzer)
- Drymopsalta crepitum Ewart, 2005 (Cape York Heath-buzzer)
- Drymopsalta daemeli (Distant, 1905) (Brown Heath-buzzer)
- Drymopsalta hobsoni Ewart & Popple, 2013 (Inglewood Heath-buzzer)
- Drymopsalta wallumi Ewart & Popple, 2013 (Wallum Heath-buzzer)

Genus Erempsalta Moulds, 2012

- Erempsalta hermannsburgensis (Distant, 1907) (Turkey Bush Cicada)

Genus Ewartia Moulds, 2012

- Ewartia adusta Moulds & Marshall, 2022) (Sporty Wattle Cicada)
- Ewartia brevis (Ashton, 1912) (Cooktown Wattle Cicada)
- Ewartia carina Popple, 2017) (Cape York Wattle Cicada)
- Ewartia cuensis (Distant, 1913) (Western Wattle Cicada)
- Ewartia etesia Popple, 2017) (Northern Wattle Cicada)
- Ewartia lapidosa Popple, 2017) (Inland Wattle Cicada)
- Ewartia oldfieldi (Distant, 1883) (Broad-striped Wattle Cicada)
- Ewartia roberti Popple, 2017) (Thin-striped Wattle Cicada)
- Ewartia thamna Popple, 2017) (Shrub Wattle Cicada)

Genus Falcatpsalta Owen and Moulds, 2016

- Falcatpsalta aquilus (Ewart, 1989) (Sooty Squeaker)

Genus Froggattoides Distant, 1910

- Froggattoides pallidus (Ashton, 1912) (Western Bent-wing)
- Froggattoides typicus Distant, 1910 (Eastern Bent-wing)

Genus Gagatopsalta Ewart, 2005

- Gagatopsalta obscura Ewart, 2005 (Clip-clop Cicada)
- Gagatopsalta auranti Ewart, 2005 (Painted Brigalow Ticker)

Genus Galanga Moulds, 2012

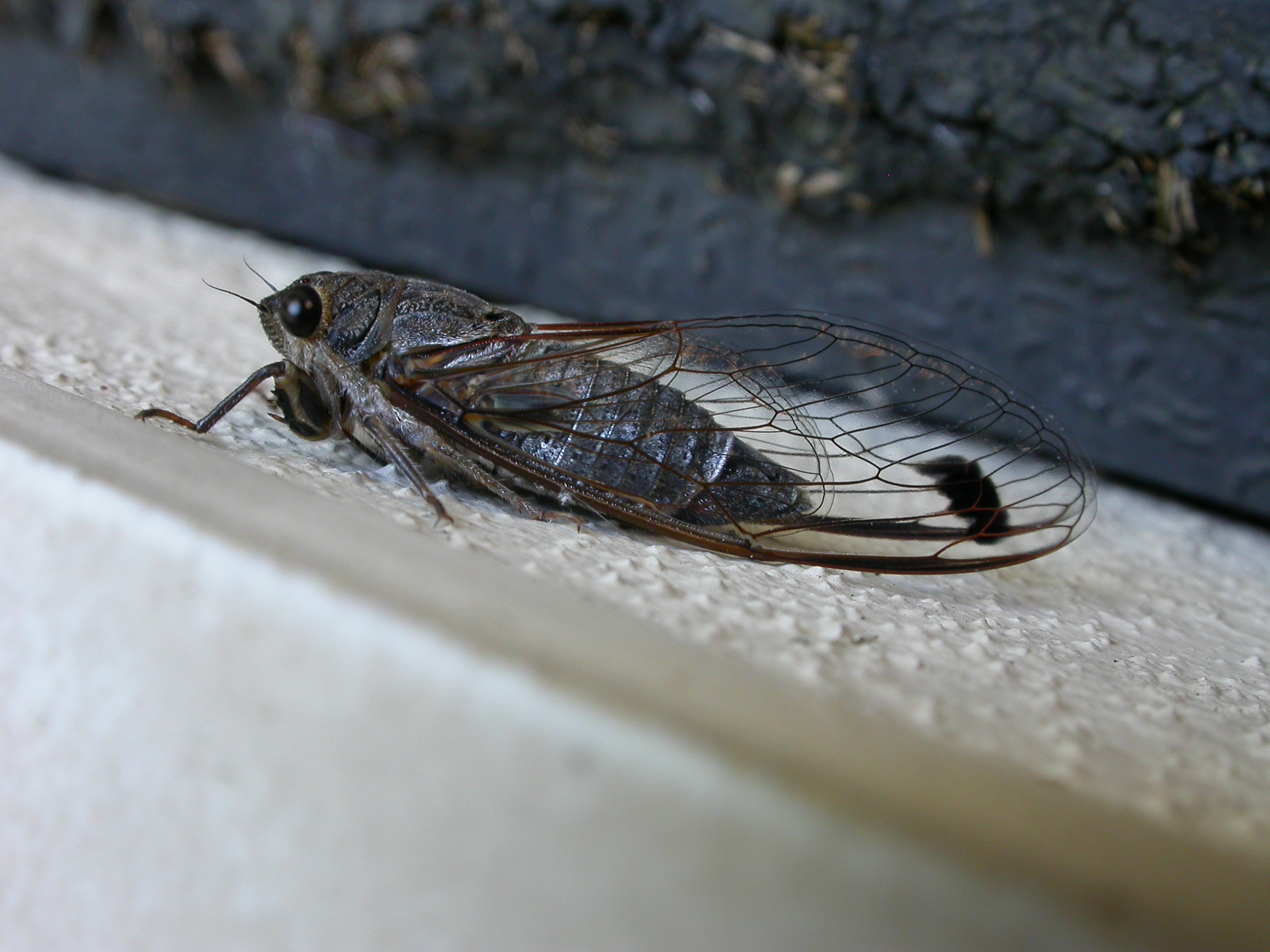
Galanga labeculata

- Galanga labeculata (Distant 1882) (Double-spotted Cicada)

Genus Gelidea Moulds, 2012

- Gelidea torrida (Erichson, 1842) (Southern Spotted Cicada)

Genus Graminitigrina Ewart and Marques, 2008

- Graminitigrina aurora Ewart, Popple and Hill, 2017 (Emerald Grass-ticker)
- Graminitigrina bolloni Ewart and Marques, 2008 (Southern Grass-clicker )
- Graminitigrina bowensis Ewart and Marques, 2008 (Northern Grass-clicker)
- Graminitigrina carnarvonensis Ewart and Marques, 2008 (Maranoa Grass-clicker)
- Graminitigrina einasleighi Ewart, Popple and Hill, 2017 (Ornamental Grass-clicker)
- Graminitigrina flindensis Ewart, Popple and Hill, 2017 (Hughenden Grass-clicker)
- Graminitigrina karumbae Ewart and Marques, 2008 (Far Northern Grass-clicker)
- Graminitigrina selwynensis Ewart, Popple and Hill, 2017 (Selwyn Range Grass-clicker)
- Graminitigrina triodiae Ewart and Marques, 2008 (Central Grass-clicker)
- Graminitigrina uluruensis Ewart, Popple and Hill, 2017 (Uluru Grass-clicker)

Genus Gudanga Distant, 1905

- Gudanga adamsi Moulds, 1996 (Northern Brigalow Blackwing)
- Gudanga aurea Moulds, 1996 (Golden Blackwing)
- Gudanga boulayi Distant, 1905 (Red Blackwing)
- Gudanga browni (Distant, 1913) (Orange Blackwing)
- Gudanga emmotti Ewart and Popple, 2013 (Noonbah Blackwing)
- Gudanga kalgoorliensis Moulds, 1996 (Kalgoorlie Blackwing)
- Gudanga kolos Moulds & Marshall, 2025 (Wingpatch)
- Gudanga lithgowae Ewart and Popple, 2013 (Southern Brigalow Blackwing)
- Gudanga nowlandi Ewart and Popple, 2013 (Mulga Blackwing)
- Gudanga pterolongata Olive, 2007 (Croydon Blackwing)
- Gudanga solata Moulds, 1996 (Dark Red Blackwing)

Genus Haemopsalta Owen and Moulds, 2016

- Haemopsalta aktites (Ewart, 1989) (Beach Squeaker)
- Haemopsalta eximia Emery & Emery, 2021 (Dharug Squeaker)
- Haemopsalta flammeata Owen & Moulds, 2016 (Sunray Squeaker)
- Haemopsalta georgina Owen & Moulds, 2016 (Tasmanian Squeaker)
- Haemopsalta rubea (Goding & Froggatt, 1904) (Red Squeaker)

Genus Heliopsalta Moulds, 2012

- Heliopsalta polita (Popple, 2003) (Enamel Cicada)

Genus Heremusina Ewart, 2018

- Heremusina pipatio Ewart, 2018 (Cloncurry Watch-winder)
- Heremusina udeoecetes Ewart, 2018 (Alice Springs Watch-winder)

Genus Kalarko Moulds & Marshall, 2022

- Kalarko ferruginosus Moulds & Marshall, 2022 (Flying Red Snapper)

Genus Kikihia Dugdale, 1972

- Kikihia convicta (Distant, 1892) (Norfolk Island Cicada)

Genus Kobonga Distant, 1906

- Kobonga apicans Moulds and Kopestonsky, 2001 (Northern Robust Clicker)
- Kobonga apicata (Ashton, 1914) (Western Clicker)
- Kobonga froggatti Distant, 1913 (Maroon Clicker )
- Kobonga fuscomarginata (Distant, 1914) (Slow Dinger)
- Kobonga godingi (Distant, 1905) (Southern Robust Clicker)
- Kobonga oxleyi (Distant, 1882) (Moree Dinger)
- Kobonga umbrimargo (Walker, 1858) (Orange Clicker)

Genus Limnopsalta Moulds, 2012

- Limnopsalta stradbrokensis (Distant, 1915) (Wallum Sedge-clicker)

Genus Marteena Moulds, 1986

- Marteena rubricincta (Goding and Froggatt, 1904) (Mallee Chirper)

Genus Mugadina Moulds, 2012

- Mugadina cloncurryi Ewart, 2022 (Straw Grass-ticker)
- Mugadina emma (Goding & Froggatt, 1904) (Amber Grass-ticker)
- Mugadina hamiltoni Ewart, 2022 (Hamilton Grass-ticker)
- Mugadina marshalli (Distant, 1911) (Yellow Grass-ticker)
- Mugadina superba Ewart & Moulds, 2021 (Superb Grass-ticker)

Genus Myopsalta Moulds, 2012

- Myopsalta albiventris Popple, 2017 (Pale-bellied Grass Buzzer)
- Myopsalta atrata (Goding and Froggatt, 1904) (Orange-bellied Buzzer)
- Myopsalta bassiana Popple, 2017 (Bassian Buzzer)
- Myopsalta binotata (Goding and Froggatt, 1904) (Robust Smoky Buzzer)
- Myopsalta bisonabilis Popple and Stolarski, 2024 (Adelaide Buzzer)
- Myopsalta chrysopedia Popple, 2017 (Black Sandplain Buzzer)
- Myopsalta coolahensis Emery, Emery and Popple, 2015 (Coolah Grass Buzzer)
- Myopsalta crucifera (Ashton, 1914) (Brown Buzzer)
- Myopsalta gordoni Popple, 2017 (Black Acacia Buzzer)
- Myopsalta leona Popple, 2017 (Black Brigalow Buzzer)
- Myopsalta longicauda Popple, 2017 (Wavering Buzzer)
- Myopsalta riverina Popple, 2017 (Eastern Mallee Buzzer)
- Myopsalta septa Popple, 2017 (Warwick Grass Buzzer)
- Myopsalta lactea (Distant, 1905) (Dark Smoky Buzzer)
- Myopsalta libritor Emery, Emery and Popple, 2015 (Coolah Repeater)
- Myopsalta mackinlayi (Distant, 1882) (Fence Buzzer)
- Myopsalta majurae Popple, 2017 (Mt Ainslie Buzzer)
- Myopsalta melanobasis Popple, 2017 (Broad-winged Buzzer)
- Myopsalta parvula Popple, 2017 (Black Mountain Tinkler)
- Myopsalta platyptera Popple, 2017 (Theodore Chirper)
- Myopsalta umbra Popple, 2017 (Olive Vine Buzzer)
- Myopsalta waterhousei (Distant, 1905) (Smoky Buzzer)
- Myopsalta wollomombii (Coombs, 1995) (New England Grass Buzzer)
- Myopsalta xerograsidia Popple, 2017 (Fishing Reel Buzzer)

Genus Nanopsalta Moulds, 2012

- Nanopsalta basalis (Goding and Froggatt, 1904) (Paperbark Tree-buzzer)

Genus Neopunia Moulds, 2012

- Neopunia graminis (Goding and Froggatt, 1904) (Fluoro Grass Pixie)

Genus Noongara Moulds, 2012

- Noongara issoides (Distant, 1905) (Perth Stubby-wing)

Genus Palapsalta Moulds, 2012

- Palapsalta belli Emery, Emery and Hutchinson, 2018 (Pilbara Tree-buzzer)
- Palapsalta circumdata (Walker, 1852) (Bronze Tree-buzzer)
- Palapsalta eyrei (Distant, 1882) (Yellow Tree-buzzer)
- Palapsalta ligneocauda Emery, Emery and Hutchinson, 2018 (Lime Tree-buzzer)
- Palapsalta palaga Owen and Moulds, 2016 (Northern River Tree-buzzer)
- Palapsalta serpens Owen and Moulds, 2016 (Pale-sided Tree-buzzer)
- Palapsalta virgulata (Ewart, 1989) (Striped Tree-buzzer)
- Palapsalta vitellina (Ewart, 1989) (Eastern River Tree-buzzer)

Genus Paraclinata Moulds & Marshall, 2025

- Paraclinata chlorotes Moulds & Marshall, 2025 (Green Wingbanger)
- Paraclinata nullarboris Moulds & Marshall, 2025 (Nullarbor Wingbanger)

Genus Paradina Moulds, 2012

- Paradina leichardti (Distant, 1882) (Black Grass-ticker)

Genus Parvopsalta Moulds & Marshall, 2022

- Parvopsalta victoriae Moulds & Marshall, 2022 (Podgy Black Chirper)

Genus Pauropsalta Goding and Froggatt, 1904

- Pauropsalta accola Owen and Moulds, 2016 (Subcoastal Squawker)
- Pauropsalta adelphe Owen and Moulds, 2016 (Top End Frog Squawker)
- Pauropsalta agasta Owen and Moulds, 2016 (Kimberley Frog Squawker)
- Pauropsalta borealis Goding and Froggatt, 1904 (Little Orange Squawker)
- Pauropsalta castanea Goding and Froggatt, 1904 (Flinders Squawker)
- Pauropsalta confinis Owen and Moulds, 2016 (Seismic Squawker)
- Pauropsalta conflua Owen and Moulds, 2016 (Small Mallee Squawker)
- Pauropsalta contigua Owen and Moulds, 2016 (Oven Squawker)
- Pauropsalta elgneri (Ashton, 1912) (Cape York Galloper)
- Pauropsalta ewarti Owen and Moulds, 2016 (Herberton Squawker)
- Pauropsalta extensa Goding and Froggatt, 1904 (Slender Squawker)
- Pauropsalta extrema (Distant, 1892) (Typewriter)
- Pauropsalta herveyensis Owen and Moulds, 2016 (Herveys Range Squawker)
- Pauropsalta infrasila Moulds, 1987 (Tropical Orange Squawker)
- Pauropsalta infuscata (Goding and Froggatt, 1904) (Large Mallee Squawker)
- Pauropsalta juncta Owen and Moulds, 2016 (Stirling Squawker)
- Pauropsalta katherina Owen and Moulds, 2016 (Kathy's Squawker)
- Pauropsalta kriki Owen and Moulds, 2016 (River Galloper)
- Pauropsalta melanopygia Germar, 1834) (Strident Sqawker)
- Pauropsalta mneme (Walker, 1850) (Alarm Clock Squawker)
- Pauropsalta opaca Ewart, 1989 (Fairy Dust Squawker)
- Pauropsalta rubra Goding & Froggatt, 1904 (Sale Squeaker)
- Pauropsalta similis Owen and Moulds, 2016 (Kimberley Squawker)
- Pauropsalta sinavilla Owen and Moulds, 2016 (Pilbara Squawker)
- Pauropsalta stigmatica Distant, 1905 (Small Adelaide Squawker)
- Pauropsalta walkeri Moulds and Owen, 2011 (Normanton Squawker)

Genus Pedana Moulds & Marshall, 2022

- Pedana hesperia Moulds & Marshall, 2022 (Buzzing Stubby-wing)

Genus Pegapsaltria Moulds & Marshall, 2022

- Pegapsaltria lutea Moulds & Marshall, 2022 (Flying Yellow Fairy)

Genus Pericallea Moulds, Marshall & Hutchinson, 2022

- Pericallea ewartioides Popple, 2024 (Gold Silver Heath-buzzer)
- Pericallea katherina Moulds, Marshall & Hutchinson, 2022 (Green Silver Heath-buzzer)

Genus Physeema Moulds, 2012

- Physeema bellatrix (Ashton, 1914) (Esperance Ticker)
- Physeema convergens (Walker, 1850) (Duke)
- Physeema labyrinthica (Walker, 1850) (Southern Coastal Ticker)
- Physeema latorea (Walker, 1850) (Northern Sandplain Ticker)
- Physeema quadricincta (Walker, 1850) (Tick-tock)

Genus Pipilopsalta Ewart, 2005

- Pipilopsalta ceuthoviridis Ewart, 2005 (Green Desert Ticker)

Genus Platypsalta Moulds, 2012

- Platypsalta dubia (Goding and Froggatt, 1904) (Black Scrub-buzzer)
- Platypsalta mixta (Distant, 1914) (Black Scrub-buzzer)

Genus Plerapsalta Moulds, 2012

- Plerapsalta incipiens (Walker, 1850) (Tiny Ambertail)
- Plerapsalta multifascia (Walker, 1850) (Neon Ambertail)

Genus Popplepsalta Owen and Moulds, 2016

- Popplepsalta aeroides Owen and Moulds, 2016 (Blue-banded Scratcher)
- Popplepsalta annulata (Goding and Froggatt, 1904) (Sprinkler Squeaker)
- Popplepsalta ayrensis (Ewart, 1989) (Ephemeral Squeaker)
- Popplepsalta blackdownensis (Popple, 2013) (Blackdown Squeaker)
- Popplepsalta corymbiae (Popple, 2013) (Western Red-eyed Squeaker)
- Popplepsalta decora (Popple, 2013) (Static Squeaker)
- Popplepsalta granitica (Popple, 2013) (Northern Red-eyed Squeaker)
- Popplepsalta inversa (Popple, 2013) (Retro Squeaker)
- Popplepsalta kobongoides (Popple, 2013) (Mimic Squeaker)
- Popplepsalta notialis (Popple, 2013)
  - Popplepsalta notialis incitata (Popple, 2013) (Inland Sprinkler Squeaker)
  - Popplepsalta notialis notialis (Popple, 2013) (Southern Red-eyed Squeaker)
- Popplepsalta rubristrigata (Goding and Froggatt, 1904) (Red Scratcher)
- Popplepsalta simplex (Popple, 2013) (Atherton Squeaker)
- Popplepsalta subtropica (Popple, 2013) (Subtropical Red-eyed Squeaker)
- Popplepsalta torrensis (Popple, 2013) (Hughenden Red-eyed Squeaker)
- Popplepsalta tremula (Popple, 2013) (Maraca Squeaker)

Genus Punia Moulds, 2012

- Punia hyas Moulds, 2020
- Punia kolos Moulds, 2020
- Punia limpida Moulds, 2020
- Punia minima (Goding & Froggatt, 1904) (Grass Pygmy)
- Punia queenslandica Moulds, 2020

Genus Pyropsalta Moulds, 2012

- Pyropsalta amnica Moulds & Marshall, 2022 (Perth Bandit)
- Pyropsalta melete (Walker, 1850) (Red Bandit)
- Pyropsalta patula Moulds & Marshall, 2022 (Pale Bandit)
- Pyropsalta rhythmica Moulds & Marshall, 2022 (Orange Bandit)

Genus Relictapsalta Owen and Moulds, 2016

- Relictapsalta nigristriga (Goding and Froggatt, 1904) (Dusty Squawker)

Genus Samaecicada Popple and Emery, 2010

- Samaecicada mallee Popple, 2023 (Mallee Fairy)
- Samaecicada subolivacea (Ashton, 1912) (Red-eyed Fairy)

Genus Simona Moulds, 2012

- Simona erema Ewart, Popple and Marshall, 2015 (Roaring Senna Cicada)
- Simona retracta Ewart, Popple and Marshall, 2015 (Charleville Eremophila Cicada)
- Simona sancta (Distant, 1913) (Western Eremophila Cicada)

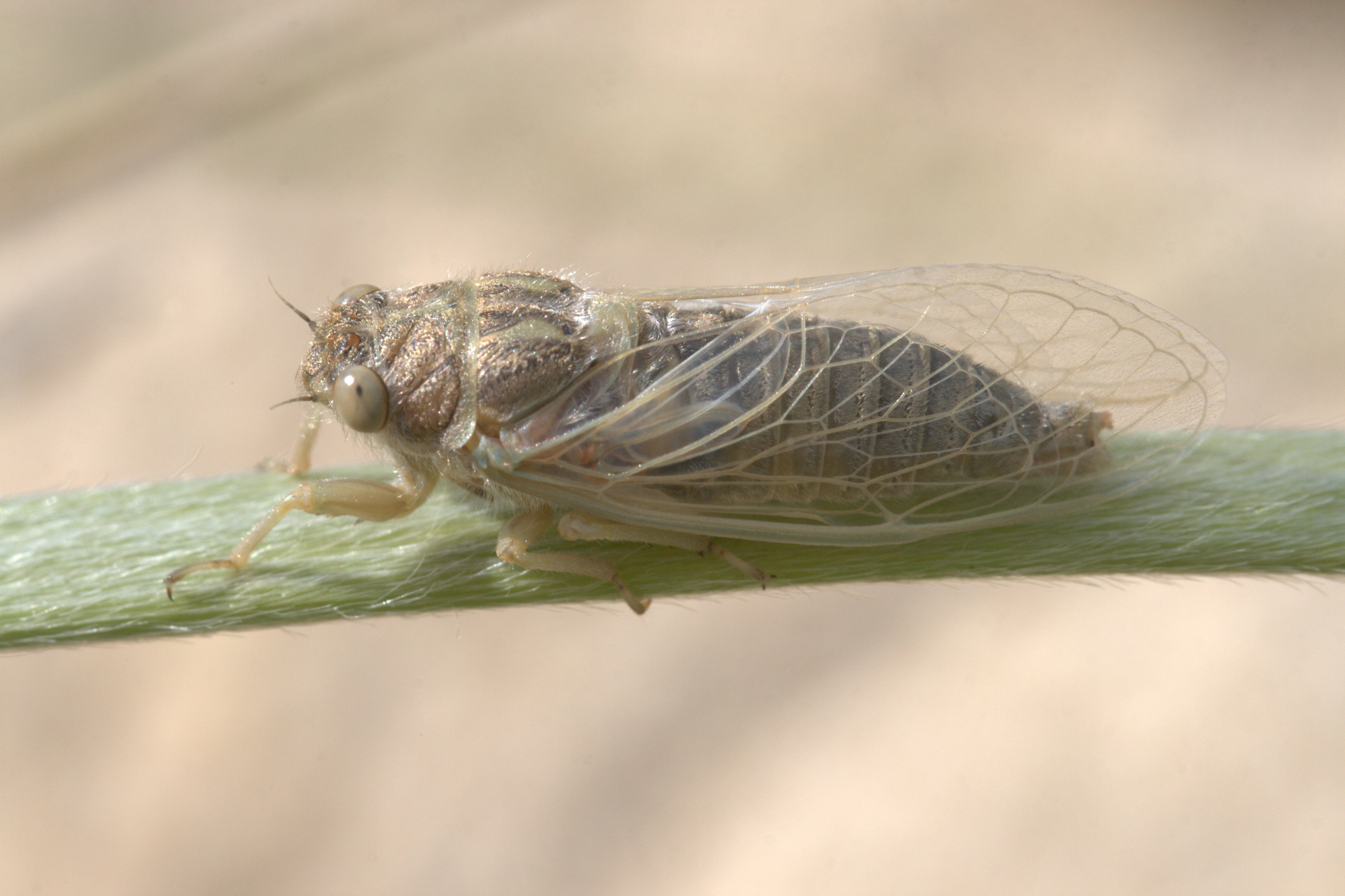
Sylphoides arenaria

Genus Sylphoides Moulds, 2012

- Sylphoides arenaria (Distant, 1907) (Sand Fairy)

Genus Taurella Moulds, 2012

- Taurella forresti (Distant, 1882) (Hibiscus Cicada)
- Taurella froggatti (Distant, 1907) (Red Fairy)
- Taurella viridis (Ashton, 1912) (Emerald Fairy)

Genus Telmapsalta Moulds, 2012

- Telmapsalta hackeri (Distant, 1915) (Paperbark Cicada)

Genus Terepsalta Moulds, 2012

- Terepsalta infans (Walker, 1850) (Southern Stubby Grass-ticker)
- Terepsalta leichhardti Ewart, 2013 (Northern Stubby Grass-ticker)

Genus Toxala Moulds, 2012

- Toxala verna (Distant, 1912) (Bent-winged Grass-buzzer)
- Toxala mckinnonae Popple, 2015 (Herberton Grass-buzzer)

Genus Urabunana Distant, 1905

- Urabunana sericeivitta (Walker, 1862) (Eastern Grass-buzzer)

Genus Uradolichos Moulds, 2012

- Uradolichos longipennis (Ashton, 1914) (Candy Tiger-squawker)
- Uradolichos rotunda Owen and Moulds, 2016 (Dark Tiger-squawker)

Genus Xeropsalta Ewart, 2018

- Xeropsalta aridula Ewart, 2018 (Simpson Desert Grass-shaker)
- Xeropsalta eremica Moulds & Marshall, 2025 (Nullarbor Green)
- Xeropsalta festiva (Distant, 1907) (Bee Gleeper)
- Xeropsalta rattrayi Ewart, 2018 (Green Grass-shaker)
- Xeropsalta thomsoni Ewart, 2018 (Birdsville Grass-ticker)

Genus Yoyetta Moulds, 2012

- Yoyetta aaede (F.Walker, 1850) (Adelaide Firetail)
- Yoyetta abdominalis (Distant, 1892) (Golden-haired Firetail)
- Yoyetta australicta Popple & Emery, 2022 (Southern Ticking Ambertail)
- Yoyetta bushi Emery, 2025
- Yoyetta celis (Moulds, 1988) (Silver Princess)
- Yoyetta corbinorum Emery, 2025
- Yoyetta corindi Popple & Emery, 2022 (North Coast Ambertail)
- Yoyetta crepita Emery, 2025
- Yoyetta cumberlandi Emery, Emery & Popple, 2015 (Cumberland Ambertail)
- Yoyetta darug Emery, Emery & Popple, 2025 (Sydney Ticking Ambertail)
- Yoyetta delicata Popple & Emery, 2022 (Delicate Ambertail)
- Yoyetta denisoni (Distant, 1893) (Black Firetail)
- Yoyetta douglasi Popple & Emery, 2020 (Grampians Firetail)
- Yoyetta electrica Emery, Emery & Popple, 2019 (Rattling Firetail)
- Yoyetta enigmatica Popple & Emery, 2020 (Restless Firetail)
- Yoyetta fluviatilis Emery, Emery & Popple, 2015 (River Ambertail)
- Yoyetta fumea Emery, Emery & Popple, 2025 (Smoky-winged Ambertail)
- Yoyetta grandis Emery, Emery & Popple, 2019 Red-eyed Firetail)
- Yoyetta humphreyae Moulds & Popple, 2018 (Varied Ambertail)
- Yoyetta hunterorum (Moulds, 1988) (Sydney Treetop Ticker)
- Yoyetta ignita Popple & Emery, 2022 Fiery Ambertail)
- Yoyetta incepta (F.Walker, 1850) (False Ambertail)
- Yoyetta kershawi (Goding & Froggatt, 1904) (Victorian Firetail)
- Yoyetta landsboroughi (Distant, 1882) (Small Bassian Ambertail)
- Yoyetta loftyensis Popple & Emery, 2020 (Mount Lofty Firetail)
- Yoyetta nathani Emery, 2025
- Yoyetta ngarabal Popple & Emery, 2020 (Glade Firetail)
- Yoyetta nigrimontana Emery, Emery & Popple, 2015 (Small Southern Ambertail)
- Yoyetta psammitica Emery, Emery & Popple, 2025 (Sandstone Ambertail)
- Yoyetta regalis Emery, Emery & Popple, 2019 (Red Ringer)
- Yoyetta repetens Emery, Emery & Popple, 2015 (Zipping Ambertail)
- Yoyetta robertsonae Moulds, Popple & Emery, 2020 (Clicking Ambertail)
- Yoyetta robusta Popple & Emery, 2022 (Robust Ambertail)
- Yoyetta serrata Emery, Emery & Popple, 2019 (Serrated Firetail)
- Yoyetta spectabilis Emery, Emery & Popple, 2019 (Wavering Firetail)
- Yoyetta subalpina Emery, Emery & Popple, 2019 (Subalpine Firetail)
- Yoyetta timothyi Emery, Emery & Popple, 2019 (Brown Firetail)
- Yoyetta tristrigata (Goding & Froggatt, 1904) (Tropical Ambertail)
- Yoyetta verrens Emery, Emery & Popple, 2019 (Sweeping Firetail)

==== Tribe Chlorocystini Distant, 1905 ====
Genus Chlorocysta Westwood, 1851

- Chlorocysta fumea (Ashton, 1914) (McIllwraith Range Bottle Cicada)
- Chlorocysta suffusa (Distant, 1907) (Marbled Bottle Cicada)
- Chlorocysta vitripennis (Westwood, 1851) (Lesser Bottle Cicada)

Genus Cystopsaltria Goding and Froggatt, 1904

- Cystopsaltria immaculata Goding and Froggatt, 1904 (Rare Bladder Cicada)

Genus Cystosoma Westwood, 1842

- Cystosoma saundersii Westwood, 1842 (Bladder Cicada)
- Cystosoma schmeltzi Distant, 1882 (Small Bladder Cicada)

Genus Euthemopsaltria Moulds, 2014

- Euthemopsaltria laeta Moulds, 2014 (Reticulate Bottle Cicada)

Genus Glaucopsaltria Goding and Froggatt, 1904

- Glaucopsaltria viridis Goding and Froggatt, 1904 (Bottle Cicada)

Genus Guineapsaltria de Boer, 1993

- Guineapsaltria flava (Goding and Froggatt), 1904 (Green Fairy)

Genus Gymnotympana Stål, 1861

- Gymnotympana rufa (Ashton, 1914) (Crimson Fairy)
- Gymnotympana varicolor (Distant, 1907) (Red Belly)

Genus Owra Ashton, 1912

- Owra insignis Ashton, 1912 (Green Ghost)

Genus Thaumastopsaltria Kirkaldy, 1900

- Thaumastopsaltria globosa (Distant, 1897) (Slender Green Growler)
- Thaumastopsaltria smithersi Moulds, 2012 (Robust Green Growler)

Genus Venustria Goding and Froggatt, 1904

- Venustria superba Goding and Froggatt, 1904 (Frog Cicada)

==== Tribe Pictilini Moulds & Hill, 2018 ====
Genus Amica Moulds & Marshall, 2025

- Amica glauca Moulds & Marshall, 2025 (Bluebush Cicada)
- Amica sitis Moulds & Marshall, 2025 (Woomera Green Friendly)

Genus Chrysocicada Boulard, 1989

- Chrysocicada franceaustralae Boulard, 1989 (Broad-headed Alea)
- Chrysocicada inflata Emery & Emery, 2023 (Narrow-headed Alea)
- Chrysocicada trophis Moulds & Marshall, 2022 (Golden Alea)

Genus Pictila Moulds, 2012

- Pictila occidentalis (Goding and Froggatt, 1904) (Green Mallee Cicada)

==== Tribe Prasiini Matsumura, 1917 ====
Genus Lembeja Distant, 1883

- Lembeja paradoxa (Karsch, 1890) (Bagpipe Cicada)
- Lembeja vitticollis (Ashton, 1912) (Brown Leaf Cicada)

==== Tribe Lamotialnini Boulard, 1976 ====
Genus Aleeta Moulds, 2003

- Aleeta curvicosta (Germar, 1834) (Floury Baker)

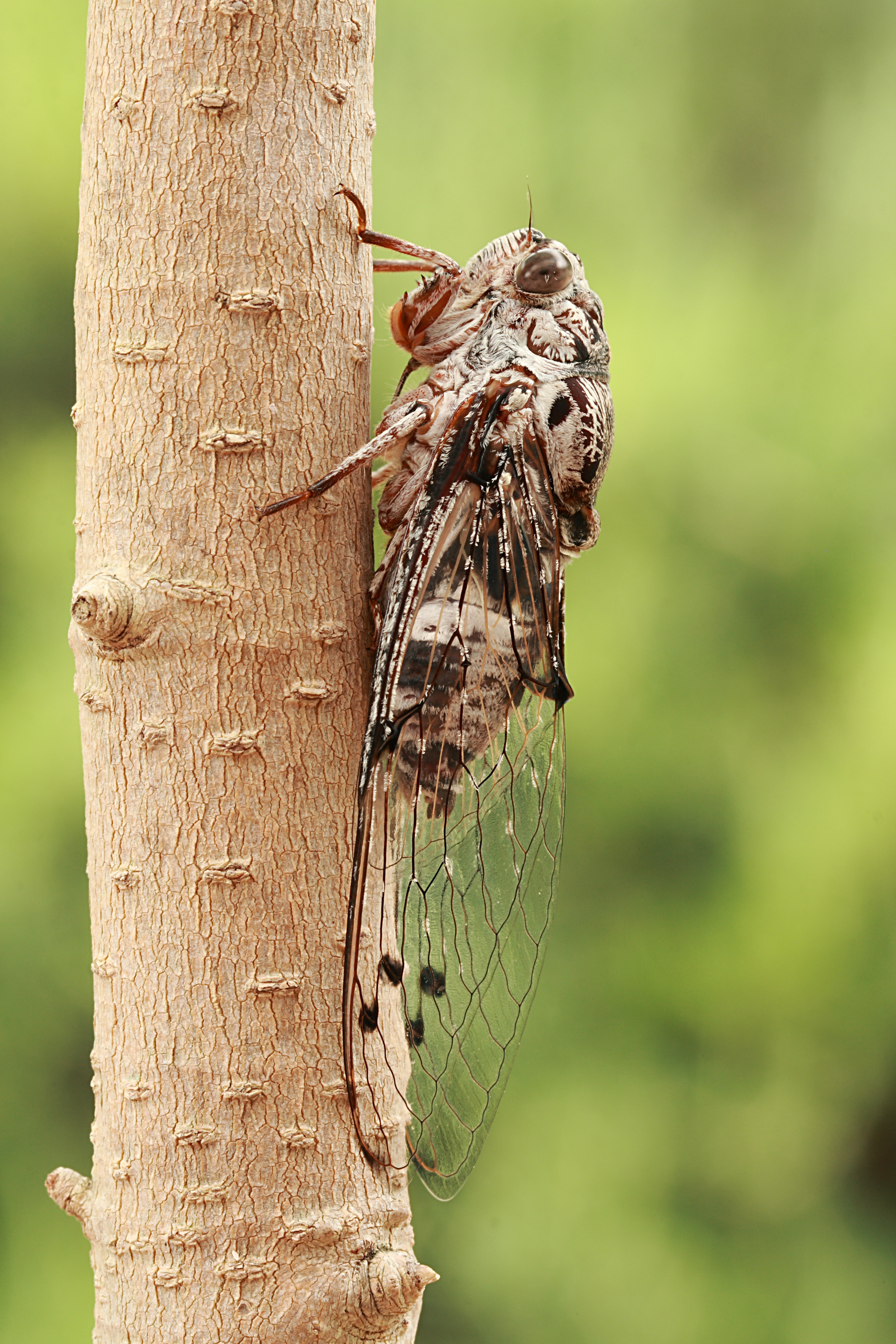
Aleeta curvicosta

Genus Tryella Moulds, 2003

- Tryella adela Moulds, 2003 (Small Maroon Bullet)
- Tryella burnsi Moulds, 2003 (Brown Bullet)
- Tryella castanea (Distant, 1905) (Small Rusty Bullet)
- Tryella crassa Moulds, 2003 (Dusky Bullet)
- Tryella fumipennis Emery, Emery, Hutchinson & Ong, 2022 (Smoky-winged Bullet)
- Tryella graminea Moulds, 2003 (Grass Bullet)
- Tryella infuscata Moulds, 2003 (Large Maroon Bullet)
- Tryella kauma Moulds, 2003 (Silver-striped Bullet)
- Tryella lachlani Moulds, 2003 (Golden Black Bullet)
- Tryella noctua (Distant, 1913) (Chocolate Bullet)
- Tryella occidens Moulds, 2003 (Dusty Brown Bullet)
- Tryella ochra Moulds, 2003 (Golden Brown Bullet)
- Tryella rubra (Goding and Froggatt, 1904) (Large Rusty Bullet)
- Tryella stalkeri (Distant, 1907) (Honey Bullet)
- Tryella willsi (Distant, 1882) (Black Bullet)
- Tryella wuggubun Emery, Emery, Hutchinson & Ong, 2022 (Kimberley Bullet)

== Family Tettigarctidae Distant, 1905 ==
=== Subfamily Tettigarctinae Distant, 1905 ===
==== Tribe Tettigarctini Distant, 1905 ====
Genus Tettigarcta White, 1845

- Tettigarcta crinita Distant, 1883 (Alpine Hairy Cicada)
- Tettigarcta tomentosa White, 1845 (Tasmanian Hairy Cicada)

== See also ==
- An article in the Sydney Morning Herald describing Australian cicadas.
