= List of Cicadettinae genera =

These 228 genera belong to Cicadettinae, a subfamily of cicadas in the family Cicadidae. There are at least 1,200 described species in Cicadettinae.

== Cicadettinae genera ==
- Abagazara Distant, 1905^{c g}
- Abricta Stål, 1866^{c g}
- Abroma Stål, 1866^{i c g}
- Acyroneura Torres, 1958^{i c g}
- Adelia Moulds, 2012^{c g}
- Adeniana Distant, 1905^{c g}
- Aedeastria de Boer, 1990^{c g}
- Aestuansella Boulard, 1981^{c g}
- Ahomana Distant, 1905^{i c g}
- Akamba Distant, 1905^{c g}
- Aleeta Moulds, 2003^{c g}
- Allobroma Duffels, 2011^{c g}
- Amphipsalta Fleming, 1969^{c g}
- Anopercalna Boulard, 2008^{c g}
- Aragualna Champanhet, Boulard & Gaiani, 2000^{i c g}
- Arcystasia Distant, 1882^{c g}
- Arfaka Distant, 1905^{c g}
- Atrapsalta Owen & Moulds, 2016^{c g}
- Auscala Moulds, 2012^{c g}
- Auta Distant, 1897^{c g}
- Baeturia Stål, 1866^{c g}
- Bafutalna Boulard, 1993^{c g}
- Berberigetta Costa, Nunes, Marabuto, Mendes & Simões, 2017^{c g}
- Bijaurana Distant, 1912^{c g}
- Birrima Distant, 1906^{c g}
- Bispinalta Delorme, 2017^{c g}
- Buyisa Distant, 1907^{c g}
- Caledopsalta Delorme, 2017^{c g}
- Caliginopsalta Ewart, 2005^{c g}
- Calopsaltria Stål, 1861^{c g}
- Calyria Stål, 1862^{i c g}
- Carineta Amyot & Audinet-Serville, 1843^{i c g}
- Cephalalna Boulard, 2006^{c g}
- Chalumalna Boulard, 1998^{i c g}
- Chelapsalta Moulds, 2012^{c g}
- Chlorocysta Westwood, 1851^{c g}
- Chloropsalta Haupt, 1920^{c g}
- Chrysocicada Boulard, 1989^{c g}
- Chrysolasia Moulds, 2003^{i c g}
- Cicadatra Kolenati, 1857^{c g}
- Cicadetta Kolenati, 1857^{i c g b} (small grass cicadas)
- Cicadettana Marshall & Hill, 2017^{c g}
- Clinata Moulds, 2012^{c g}
- Clinopsalta Moulds, 2012^{c g}
- Conibosa Distant, 1905^{i c g}
- Crassisternalna Boulard, 1980^{c g}
- Crotopsalta Ewart, 2005^{c g}
- Curvicicada Chou & Lu, 1997^{c g}
- Cystopsaltria Goding & Froggatt, 1904^{c g}
- Cystosoma Westwood, 1842^{c g}
- Daza Distant, 1905^{i c g}
- Decebalus Distant, 1920^{c g}
- Derotettix Berg, 1882^{i c g}
- Diemeniana Distant, 1906^{c g}
- Dimissalna Boulard, 2007^{c g}
- Dinarobia Mamet, 1957^{c g}
- Dipsopsalta Moulds, 2012^{c g}
- Dorachosa Distant, 1892^{i c g}
- Drymopsalta Ewart, 2005^{c g}
- Dulderana Distant, 1905^{i c g}
- Durangona Distant, 1911^{i c g}
- Elachysoma Torres, 1964^{i c g}
- Emathia Stål, 1866^{c g}
- Erempsalta Moulds, 2012^{c g}
- Euboeana Gogala, Trilar & Drosopoulos, 2011^{c g}
- Euryphara Horváth, 1912^{c g}
- Euthemopsaltria Moulds, 2014^{c g}
- Ewartia Moulds, 2012^{c g}
- Falcatpsalta Owen & Moulds, 2016^{c g}
- Fijipsalta Duffels, 1988^{c g}
- Fractuosella Boulard, 1979^{c g}
- Froggattoides Distant, 1910^{c g}
- Gagatopsalta Ewart, 2005^{c g}
- Galanga Moulds, 2012^{c g}
- Gelidea Moulds, 2012^{c g}
- Germalna Delorme
- Ggomapsalta Lee, 2009^{c g}
- Glaucopsaltria Goding & Froggatt, 1904^{c g}
- Graminitigrina Ewart & Marques, 2008^{c g}
- Graptotettix Stål, 1866^{c g}
- Guaranisaria Distant, 1905^{i c g}
- Gudanga Distant, 1905^{c g}
- Guineapsaltria de Boer, 1993^{c g}
- Gymnotympana Stål, 1861^{c g}
- Haemopsalta Owen & Moulds, 2016^{c g}
- Heliopsalta Moulds, 2012^{c g}
- Hemidictya Burmeister, 1835^{i c g}
- Henicotettix Stål, 1858^{c g}
- Herrera Distant, 1905^{i c g}
- Hilaphura Webb, 1979^{c g}
- Hovana Distant, 1905^{c g}
- Huechys Amyot & Audinet-Serville, 1843^{c g}
- Hylora Boulard, 1971^{c g}
- Imbabura Distant, 1911^{i c g}
- Iruana Distant, 1905^{c g}
- Jacatra Distant, 1905^{c g}
- Jafuna Distant, 1912^{c g}
- Kageralna Boulard, 2012^{c g}
- Kanakia Distant, 1892^{c g}
- Katoa Ouchi, 1938^{c g}
- Kikihia Dugdale, 1972^{c g}
- Klapperichicen Dlabola, 1957^{c g}
- Kobonga Distant, 1906^{c g}
- Koranna Distant, 1905^{c g}
- Kosemia Matsumura, 1927^{c g}
- Kumanga Distant, 1905^{c g}
- Lamotialna Boulard, 1976^{c g}
- Lembeja Distant, 1892^{c g}
- Lemuriana Distant, 1905^{g}
- Limnopsalta Moulds, 2012^{c g}
- Linguacicada Chou & Lu, 1997^{c g}
- Luangwana Distant, 1914^{c g}
- Lycurgus China, 1925^{c g}
- Magicicada Davis, 1925^{i c g b} (periodical cicadas)
- Malgotilia Boulard, 1980^{c g}
- Malloryalna Sanborn, 2016^{c g}
- Maoricicada Dugdale, 1972^{c g}
- Mapondera Distant, 1905^{c g}
- Mariekea de Jong & de Boer, 2004^{c g}
- Marteena Moulds, 1986^{c g}
- Masupha Distant, 1892^{c g}
- Melampsalta Kolenati, 1857^{c g}
- Melanesiana Delorme, 2017^{g}
- Mirabilopsaltria de Boer, 1996^{c g}
- Mogannia Amyot & Audinet-Serville, 1843^{c g}
- Monomatapa Distant, 1879^{c g}
- Mouia Distant, 1920^{c g}
- Muda Distant, 1897^{c g}
- Mugadina Moulds, 2012^{c g}
- Murmurillana Delorme, 2016^{c g}
- Murphyalna Boulard, 2012^{c g}
- Musimoia China, 1929^{c g}
- Musoda Karsch, 1890^{c g}
- Myersalna Boulard, 1988^{c g}
- Myopsalta Moulds, 2012^{c g}
- Nanopsalta Moulds, 2012^{c g}
- Nelcyndana Distant, 1906^{c g}
- Neomuda Distant, 1920^{c g}
- Neopunia Moulds, 2012^{c g}
- Nigripsaltria de Boer, 1999^{c g}
- Noongara Moulds, 2012^{c g}
- Nosola Stål, 1866^{i c g}
- Notopsalta Dugdale, 1972^{c g}
- Novemcella Goding, 1925^{i c g}
- Oligoglena Horvath, 1912^{c g}
- Oudeboschia Distant, 1920^{c g}
- Owra Ashton, 1912^{c g}
- Pachypsaltria Stål, 1861^{i c g}
- Pagiphora Horváth, 1912^{c g}
- Pakidetta Sanborn & Ahmed, 2017^{c g}
- Palapsalta Moulds, 2012^{c g}
- Panialna Delorme, 2016^{c g}
- Panka Distant, 1905^{c g}
- Papuapsaltria de Boer, 1995^{c g}
- Paradina Moulds, 2012^{c g}
- Paranistria Metcalf, 1952^{c g}
- Parnisa Stål, 1862^{i c g}
- Parvittya Distant, 1905^{c g}
- Paulaudalna Delorme, 2017^{c g}
- Pauropsalta Goding & Froggatt, 1904^{c g}
- Philipsalta Lee, Marshall & Hill, 2016^{c g}
- Physeema Moulds, 2012^{c g}
- Pictila Moulds, 2012^{c g}
- Pinheya Dlabola, 1963^{c g}
- Pipilopsalta Ewart, 2005^{c g}
- Platypsalta Moulds, 2012^{c g}
- Plerapsalta Moulds, 2012^{c g}
- Popplepsalta Owen & Moulds, 2016^{c g}
- Poviliana Boulard, 1997^{c g}
- Prasia Stål, 1863^{c g}
- Procollina Metcalf, 1952^{i c g}
- Prosotettix Jacobi, 1907^{i c g}
- Prunasis Stål, 1862^{i c g}
- Psallodia Uhler, 1903^{i c g}
- Psalmocharias Kirkaldy, 1908^{c g}
- Pseudokanakia Delorme, 2016^{c g}
- Pseudotettigetta Puissant, 2010^{c g}
- Psilotympana Stål, 1861^{c g}
- Punia Moulds, 2012^{c g}
- Pyropsalta Moulds, 2012^{c g}
- Relictapsalta Owen & Moulds, 2016^{c g}
- Rhinopsalta Melichar, 1908^{c g}
- Rhodopsalta Dugdale, 1972^{c g}
- Rouxalna Boulard, 1999^{c g}
- Samaecicada Popple & Emery, 2010^{c g}
- Sapantanga Distant, 1905^{c g}
- Saticula Stål, 1866^{c g}
- Scieroptera Stål, 1866^{c g}
- Scolopita Chou & Lei, 1997^{c g}
- Scottotympana de Boer, 1991^{c g}
- Shaoshia Wei, Ahmed & Rizvi, 2010^{c g}
- Simona Moulds, 2012^{c g}
- Stellenboschia Distant, 1920^{c g}
- Strepuntalna Delorme, 2017^{c g}
- Sundabroma Duffels, 2011^{c g}
- Sylphoides Moulds, 2012^{c g}
- Taipinga Distant, 1905^{c g}
- Takapsalta Matsumura, 1927^{c g}
- Taphura Stål, 1862^{i c g}
- Taungia Ollenbach, 1929^{c g}
- Taurella Moulds, 2012^{c g}
- Telmapsalta Moulds, 2012^{c g}
- Terepsalta Moulds, 2012^{c g}
- Tettigetta Kolenati, 1857^{c g}
- Tettigettacula Puissant, 2010^{c g}
- Tettigettalna Puissant, 2010^{c g}
- Tettigettula Puissant, 2010^{c g}
- Thaumastopsaltria Kirkaldy, 1900^{c g}
- Tibeta Lei & Chou, 1997^{c g}
- Toulgoetalna Boulard, 1982^{i c g}
- Toxala Moulds, 2012^{c g}
- Toxopeusella Schmidt, 1926^{c g}
- Triglena Fieber, 1875^{c g}
- Trismarcha Karsch, 1891^{c g}
- Tryella Moulds, 2003^{c g}
- Tympanistalna Boulard, 1982^{c g}
- Ueana Distant, 1905^{c g}
- Unduncus Duffels, 2011^{c g}
- Urabunana Distant, 1905^{c g}
- Uradolichos Moulds, 2012^{c g}
- Vagitanus Distant, 1918^{c g}
- Vastarena Delorme, 2016^{c g}
- Venustria Goding & Froggatt, 1904^{c g}
- Viettealna Boulard, 1980^{c g}
- Xossarella Boulard, 1980^{c g}
- Yoyetta Moulds, 2012^{c g}
- Zouga Distant, 1906^{c g}
- † Paleopsalta Moulds, 2018

Data sources: i = ITIS, c = Catalogue of Life, g = GBIF, b = Bugguide.net
