= List of Cicadettini genera =

These 112 genera belong to Cicadettini, a tribe of cicadas in the family Cicadidae. There are at least 520 described species in Cicadettini.

== Cicadettini genera ==
- †Paleopsalta Moulds, 2018
- Adelia Moulds, 2012
- Aestuansella Boulard, 1981
- Amphipsalta Fleming, 1969
- Atrapsalta Owen & Moulds, 2016
- Auscala Moulds, 2012
- Auta Distant, 1897
- Berberigetta Costa, Nunes, Marabuto, Mendes & Simões, 2017
- Birrima Distant, 1906
- Bispinalta Delorme, 2017
- Buyisa Distant, 1907
- Caledopsalta Delorme, 2017
- Caliginopsalta Ewart, 2005
- Chelapsalta Moulds, 2012
- Cicadetta Kolenati, 1857 (small grass cicadas)
- Cicadettana Marshall & Hill, 2017
- Clinata Moulds, 2012
- Clinopsalta Moulds, 2012
- Crotopsalta Ewart, 2005
- Curvicicada Chou & Lu, 1997
- Diemeniana Distant, 1906
- Dimissalna Boulard, 2007
- Dipsopsalta Moulds, 2012
- Drymopsalta Ewart, 2005
- Erempsalta Moulds, 2012
- Euboeana Gogala, Trilar & Drosopoulos, 2011
- Euryphara Horváth, 1912
- Ewartia Moulds, 2012
- Falcatpsalta Owen & Moulds, 2016
- Fijipsalta Duffels, 1988
- Froggattoides Distant, 1910
- Gagatopsalta Ewart, 2005
- Galanga Moulds, 2012
- Gelidea Moulds, 2012
- Germalna Delorme
- Ggomapsalta Lee, 2009
- Graminitigrina Ewart & Marques, 2008
- Graptotettix Stål, 1866
- Gudanga Distant, 1905
- Haemopsalta Owen & Moulds, 2016
- Hea Distant, 1906
- Heliopsalta Moulds, 2012
- Hilaphura Webb, 1979
- Huechys Amyot & Audinet-Serville, 1843
- Kanakia Distant, 1892
- Kikihia Dugdale, 1972
- Kobonga Distant, 1906
- Kosemia Matsumura, 1927
- Limnopsalta Moulds, 2012
- Linguacicada Chou & Lu, 1997
- Maoricicada Dugdale, 1972
- Marteena Moulds, 1986
- Melampsalta Kolenati, 1857
- Melanesiana Delorme, 2017
- Mouia Distant, 1920
- Mugadina Moulds, 2012
- Murmurillana Delorme, 2016
- Myersalna Boulard, 1988
- Myopsalta Moulds, 2012
- Nanopsalta Moulds, 2012
- Neopunia Moulds, 2012
- Nigripsaltria Boer, 1999
- Noongara Moulds, 2012
- Notopsalta Dugdale, 1972
- Oligoglena Horvath, 1912
- Pakidetta Sanborn & Ahmed, 2017
- Palapsalta Moulds, 2012
- Panialna Delorme, 2016
- Paradina Moulds, 2012
- Parvittya Distant, 1905
- Paulaudalna Delorme, 2017
- Pauropsalta Goding & Froggatt, 1904
- Philipsalta Lee, Marshall & Hill, 2016
- Physeema Moulds, 2012
- Pinheya Dlabola, 1963
- Pipilopsalta Ewart, 2005
- Platypsalta Moulds, 2012
- Plerapsalta Moulds, 2012
- Popplepsalta Owen & Moulds, 2016
- Poviliana Boulard, 1997
- Pseudokanakia Delorme, 2016
- Pseudotettigetta Puissant, 2010
- Punia Moulds, 2012
- Pyropsalta Moulds, 2012
- Relictapsalta Owen & Moulds, 2016
- Rhodopsalta Dugdale, 1972
- Rouxalna Boulard, 1999
- Samaecicada Popple & Emery, 2010
- Saticula Stål, 1866
- Scieroptera Stål, 1866
- Scolopita Chou & Lei, 1997
- Simona Moulds, 2012
- Stellenboschia Distant, 1920
- Strepuntalna Delorme, 2017
- Sylphoides Moulds, 2012
- Takapsalta Matsumura, 1927
- Taurella Moulds, 2012
- Telmapsalta Moulds, 2012
- Terepsalta Moulds, 2012
- Tettigetta Kolenati, 1857
- Tettigettacula Puissant, 2010
- Tettigettalna Puissant, 2010
- Tettigettula Puissant, 2010
- Tibeta Lei & Chou, 1997
- Toxala Moulds, 2012
- Toxopeusella Schmidt, 1926
- Tympanistalna Boulard, 1982
- Ueana Distant, 1905
- Urabunana Distant, 1905
- Uradolichos Moulds, 2012
- Vastarena Delorme, 2016
- Xossarella Boulard, 1980
- Yoyetta Moulds, 2012
