= Pedana (cicada) =

Scientific classification
- Kingdom: Animalia
- Phylum: Arthropoda
- Clade: Pancrustacea
- Class: Insecta
- Order: Hemiptera
- Suborder: Auchenorrhyncha
- Infraorder: Cicadomorpha
- Superfamily: Cicadoidea
- Family: Cicadidae
- Subfamily: Cicadettinae
- Genus: Pedana; Moulds & Marshall, 2022

Genus of cicadas

Pedana is a genus of cicadas in the family Cicadidae, subfamily Cicadettinae and tribe Cicadettini. It is endemic to Australia. It was described in 2022 by Australian entomologists Maxwell Sydney Moulds and David C. Marshall.

== Etymology ==
The genus name Pedana is derived from Greek pedanos (‘short’), with reference to the short wings of the type species.

== Species ==
As of 2025 there was one described species in the genus:

- Pedana hesperia Moulds & Marshall, 2022 (Buzzing Stubby-wing)
