= Kimberpsaltria =

Scientific classification
- Kingdom: Animalia
- Phylum: Arthropoda
- Clade: Pancrustacea
- Class: Insecta
- Order: Hemiptera
- Suborder: Auchenorrhyncha
- Infraorder: Cicadomorpha
- Superfamily: Cicadoidea
- Family: Cicadidae
- Subfamily: Cicadinae
- Genus: Kimberpsaltria; Moulds, Marshall & Popple, 2021

Genus of cicadas

Kimberpsaltria is a monotypic genus of cicadas in the family Cicadidae and tribe Kimberpsaltriini, that is endemic to Australia. It was described in 2021 by Australian entomologists Maxwell Sydney Moulds, David Marshall and Lindsay Popple.

== Species ==
There is a single species in the genus: Kimberpsaltria taenia Moulds, Marshall and Popple, 2021 is also known as the Kimberley rattle-stripe.

== Etymology ==
The generic name Kimberpsaltria is a combination derived from the Kimberley region where the genus is found, and psaltria (Greek: a female harpist). The specific epithet taenia (Latin: ‘band’ or ‘stripe’) refers to the distinctive dorsal body stripe and striped abdomen of live specimens.

== Description ==
The length of the forewing is 29–33 mm.

== Distribution and habitat ==
The species is found in the Kimberley region of north-west Western Australia, from the Gibb River Road at the junction of Durack River and Bamboo Creek north-west to the Mitchell Plateau. It inhabits tropical eucalypt woodland.

== Behaviour ==
Adults have been recorded in October and November, clinging to the trunks and branches of the eucalypt trees, uttering alternating, cricket-like, grinding calls.
