= Parvopsalta =

Scientific classification
- Kingdom: Animalia
- Phylum: Arthropoda
- Clade: Pancrustacea
- Class: Insecta
- Order: Hemiptera
- Suborder: Auchenorrhyncha
- Infraorder: Cicadomorpha
- Superfamily: Cicadoidea
- Family: Cicadidae
- Subfamily: Cicadettinae
- Genus: Parvopsalta; Moulds & Marshall, 2022

Genus of cicadas

Parvopsalta is a genus of cicadas in the family Cicadidae, subfamily Cicadettinae and tribe Cicadettini. It is endemic to Australia. It was described in 2022 by Australian entomologists Maxwell Sydney Moulds and David C. Marshall.

== Etymology ==
The genus name Parvopsalta is a combination derived from Latin parvus (‘little’), and psalta, a suffix traditionally used in the generic names of many cicada species.

== Species ==
As of 2025 there was one described species in the genus:

- Parvopsalta victoriae Moulds & Marshall, 2022 (Podgy Black Chirper)
