= Pegapsaltria =

Scientific classification
- Kingdom: Animalia
- Phylum: Arthropoda
- Clade: Pancrustacea
- Class: Insecta
- Order: Hemiptera
- Suborder: Auchenorrhyncha
- Infraorder: Cicadomorpha
- Superfamily: Cicadoidea
- Family: Cicadidae
- Subfamily: Cicadettinae
- Genus: Pegapsaltria; Moulds & Marshall, 2022

Genus of cicadas

Pegapsaltria is a genus of cicadas in the family Cicadidae, subfamily Cicadettinae and tribe Cicadettini. It is endemic to Australia. It was described in 2022 by Australian entomologists Maxwell Sydney Moulds and David C. Marshall.

== Etymology ==
The genus name Pegapsaltria is derived from Pegasus, the winged horse of Greek mythology, with reference to the horse-head shape of the theca of the type species.

== Species ==
As of 2025 there was one described species in the genus:

- Pegapsaltria lutea Moulds & Marshall, 2022 (Flying Yellow Fairy)
