= Kalarko =

Scientific classification
- Kingdom: Animalia
- Phylum: Arthropoda
- Clade: Pancrustacea
- Class: Insecta
- Order: Hemiptera
- Suborder: Auchenorrhyncha
- Infraorder: Cicadomorpha
- Superfamily: Cicadoidea
- Family: Cicadidae
- Subfamily: Cicadettinae
- Genus: Kalarko; Moulds & Marshall, 2022

Genus of cicadas

Kalarko is a genus of cicadas, also known as spinifex rattlers, in the family Cicadidae, subfamily Cicadettinae and tribe Cicadettini. It is endemic to Australia. It was described in 2022 by Australian entomologists Maxwell Sydney Moulds and David C. Marshall.

== Etymology ==
The genus name Kalarko is an arbitray combination of letters.

== Species ==
As of 2025 there was one described species in the genus:

- Kalarko ferruginosus Moulds & Marshall, 2022 (Flying Red Snapper)
