= Parnkalla =

Parnkalla may refer to:

- Parnkalla people
- Parnkalla language
- Parnkalla (cicada), a genus of cicadas
