= Brevia =

Scientific classification
- Kingdom: Animalia
- Phylum: Arthropoda
- Clade: Pancrustacea
- Class: Insecta
- Order: Hemiptera
- Suborder: Auchenorrhyncha
- Superfamily: Cicadoidea
- Family: Cicadidae
- Subfamily: Cicadettinae
- Tribe: Cicadettini
- Genus: Brevia; Moulds & Marshall, 2025

Genus of cicadas

Brevia is a genus of cicadas in the family Cicadidae, subfamily Cicadettinae and tribe Cicadettini. It is endemic to Australia. It was described in 2025 by Australian entomologists Maxwell Sydney Moulds and David C. Marshall. As of 2025 the genus contained one valid species, also known as the grey bubbler.

== Species ==
Brevia bullula Moulds & Marshall, 2025

== Etymology ==
The generic name Brevia, from Latin brevis (“short”), is an anatomical reference to the short pseudoparameres on the aedeagus. The specific epithet bullula comes from Latin bulla (“bubble”) referring to the bubbly lilt of the male's song.

== Description ==
The length of the forewing is 11–13 mm; body length is 12–13 mm.

== Distribution and habitat ==
The species occurs in the southern quarter of the Northern Territory, near Roxby Downs, Coober Pedy and Parachilna in northern South Australia, and from the vicinity of Broken Hill in western New South Wales.

== Behaviour ==
Adults have been observed from late December to February, clinging to grass stems, their appearance probably dependent on heavy summer rains, the males emitting repeated, low-frequency, bubbly rattling calls.
