= Pictila =

Scientific classification
- Kingdom: Animalia
- Phylum: Arthropoda
- Clade: Pancrustacea
- Class: Insecta
- Order: Hemiptera
- Suborder: Auchenorrhyncha
- Infraorder: Cicadomorpha
- Superfamily: Cicadoidea
- Family: Cicadidae
- Subfamily: Cicadettinae
- Genus: Pictila; Moulds, 2012

Genus of cicadas

Pictila is a genus of cicadas in the family Cicadidae, subfamily Cicadettinae and tribe Pictilini. It is endemic to Australia. It was described in 2012 by Australian entomologist Maxwell Sydney Moulds.

== Etymology ==
The genus name Pictila is derived from Latin pictilis (‘painted’), with reference to the colourful abdomen of the type species.

== Species ==
As of 2025 there was one described species in the genus:

- Pictila occidentalis Goding & Froggatt, 1904 (Green Mallee Cicada)
