= Talcopsaltria =

Scientific classification
- Kingdom: Animalia
- Phylum: Arthropoda
- Clade: Pancrustacea
- Class: Insecta
- Order: Hemiptera
- Suborder: Auchenorrhyncha
- Superfamily: Cicadoidea
- Family: Cicadidae
- Subfamily: Cicadinae
- Tribe: Talcopsaltriini
- Genus: Talcopsaltria; Moulds, 2008

Genus of true bugs

Talcopsaltria is a genus of cicadas in the family Cicadidae. It is endemic to Australia. The genus was first described in 2008 by Maxwell Sydney Moulds.

== Species ==
There is one species.

- Talcopsaltria olivei Moulds, 2008 (Tetradonta Cicada)
