= Neopsaltoda =

Scientific classification
- Kingdom: Animalia
- Phylum: Arthropoda
- Clade: Pancrustacea
- Class: Insecta
- Order: Hemiptera
- Suborder: Auchenorrhyncha
- Infraorder: Cicadomorpha
- Superfamily: Cicadoidea
- Family: Cicadidae
- Subfamily: Cicadinae
- Genus: Neopsaltoda; Distant, 1910

Genus of cicadas

Neopsaltoda is a monotypic genus of cicadas in the family Cicadidae, that is endemic to Australia. It was described in 1910 by English entomologist William Lucas Distant.

== Species ==
There is a single species in the genus:

Neopsaltoda crassa Distant, 1910 is also known as the dark knight.

== Description ==
The length of the forewing is 38–45 mm.

== Distribution and habitat ==
The species is restricted to the McIlwraith Range of the Cape York Peninsula in Far North Queensland, where it inhabits vine thicket scrub with she-oaks or paperbarks.

== Behaviour ==
Adults can be heard from late December to January, clinging to the upper branches of the trees, uttering strong, rich, pulsing calls.
