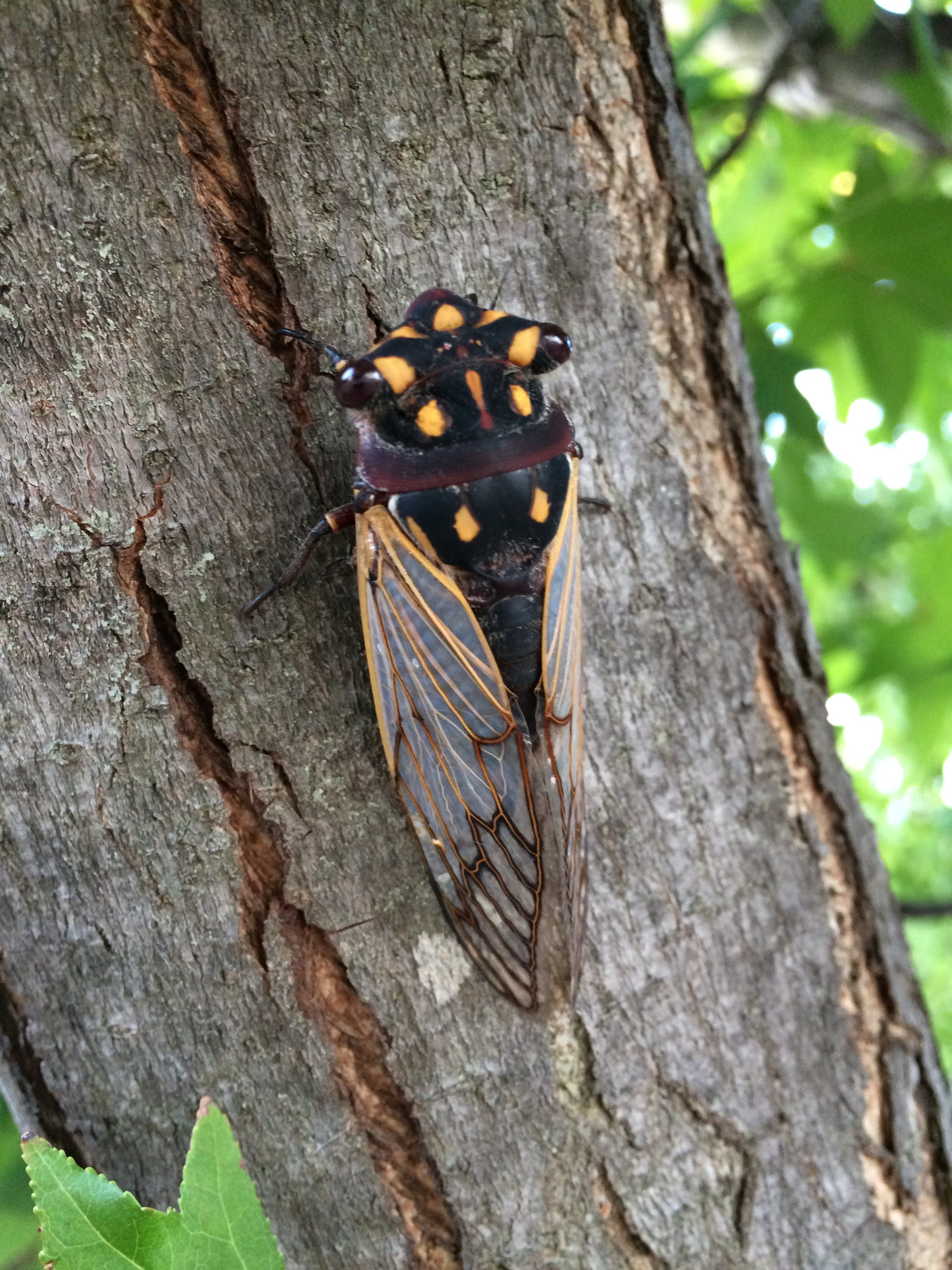

Scientific classification
- Kingdom: Animalia
- Phylum: Arthropoda
- Class: Insecta
- Order: Hemiptera
- Suborder: Auchenorrhyncha
- Family: Cicadidae
- Genus: Macrotristria
- Species: M. angularis

Binomial name
- Macrotristria angularis (Germar, 1834)

= Macrotristria angularis =

Species of true bug

Macrotristria angularis, commonly known as the cherrynose, is an Australian cicada native to eastern Australia, where it is found in sclerophyll forests.

== Taxonomy ==
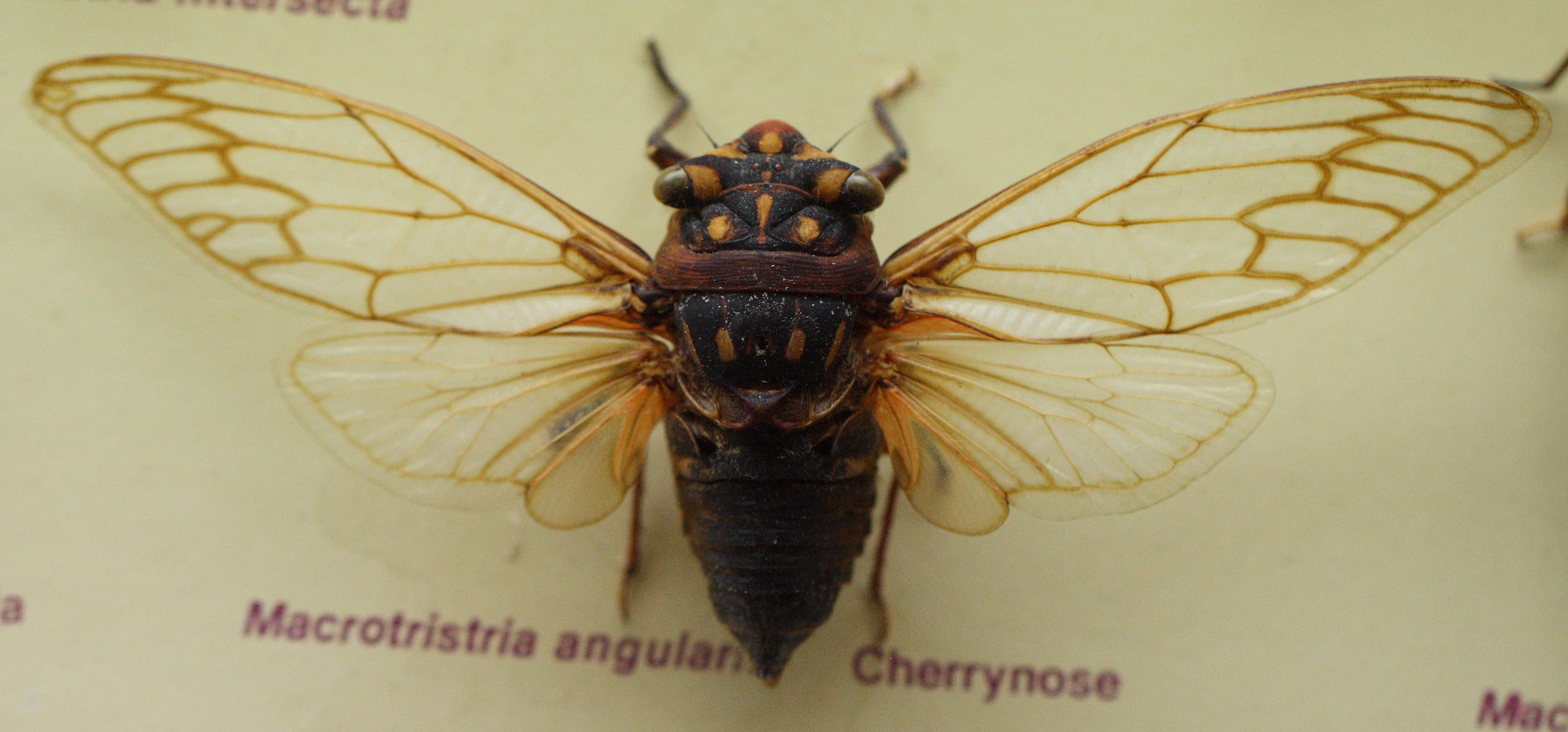
specimen in the Australian Museum

German naturalist Ernst Friedrich Germar described the cherrynose in 1834 as Cicada angularis, reporting its type locality incorrectly as Sierra Leone. Swedish entomologist Carl Stål named the genus Macrotristria in 1870, though this was misspelt as Macrotristia and Macrotistria in some later publications. The cherrynose is the type species of the genus.

The cherrynose gets its common name from a red structure that resembles a nose, yet is in fact a structure containing muscles that help the cicada suck xylem from trees with its proboscis. An alternate common name is whiskey drinker.

== Description ==
The cherrynose is a medium- to large cicada, the male and female similar in appearance. The head and thorax are black (or red-brown in North and Central Queensland) with orange markings. The postclypeus is red. The underparts are brown to blackish. They have an array of cuticular nanostructures on the transparent panes of their wings - conical protuberances with a spacing and height of about 200 nm, tipped with a spherical cap with a radius of curvature of around 25-45 nm. These act as anti-wetting and anti-reflective surfaces.

The call has a trilling sound and is made in the day and at sunset.

== Distribution and habitat ==
The adult cherrynose is found on the upper branches and trunks of tall eucalypts in sclerophyll forests, and is becoming rare in the Sydney region. They have also been recorded from sheoaks, apples (Angophora), native cypress (Callitris) and Tamarix aphylla.

== See also ==
- List of cicadas of Australia
