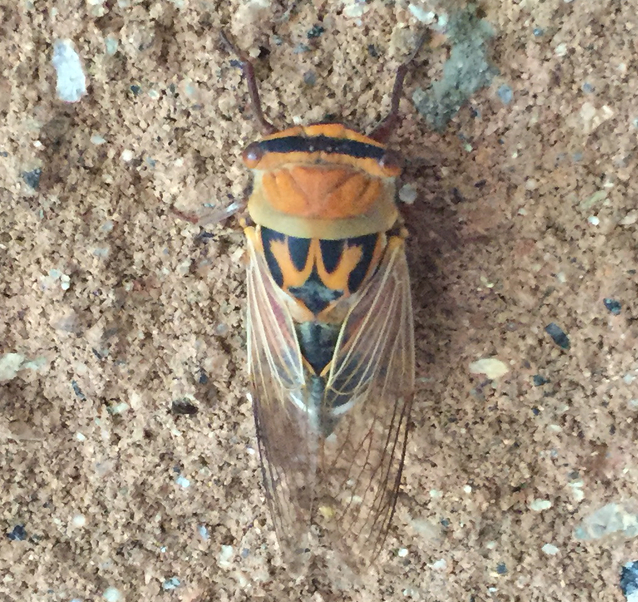

Scientific classification
- Kingdom: Animalia
- Phylum: Arthropoda
- Clade: Pancrustacea
- Class: Insecta
- Order: Hemiptera
- Suborder: Auchenorrhyncha
- Family: Cicadidae
- Genus: Thopha
- Species: T. colorata

Binomial name
- Thopha colorata Distant, 1907

= Thopha colorata =

Species of true bug

Thopha colorata, also known as the golden drummer or orange drummer, is an Australian cicada native to Central Australia. Adult cicadas alight exclusively on river red gums (Eucalyptus camaldulensis). The nymph is 18–20 millimetres (0.71–0.79 in) long and is a dull brown colour.

== See also ==
- List of cicadas of Australia
