= Austropunia =

Scientific classification
- Kingdom: Animalia
- Phylum: Arthropoda
- Clade: Pancrustacea
- Class: Insecta
- Order: Hemiptera
- Suborder: Auchenorrhyncha
- Family: Cicadidae
- Subfamily: Cicadettinae
- Tribe: Cicadettini
- Genus: Austropunia; Moulds & Marshall, 2025

Genus of cicadas

Austropunia is a genus of cicadas in the family Cicadidae, subfamily Cicadettinae and tribe Cicadettini. It is endemic to Australia. It was described in 2025 by Australian entomologists Maxwell Sydney Moulds and David C. Marshall. As of 2025 the genus contained one valid species, also known as the Munjina peeper.

== Species ==
Austropunia cheloides Moulds & Marshall, 2025

== Etymology ==
The generic name Austropunia is a combination derived from “Australia” and from the genus “Punia”, to which it is closely related. The specific epithet cheloides comes from the Greek chele (“claw”) and -oides (“similar to”), referring to the shape of the upper pygofer lobes of the male cicadas.

== Description ==
The length of the forewing is 13–18 mm; body length is 12–15 mm.

== Distribution and habitat ==
The species occurs in the Pilbara region of north-western Western Australia, between the Fortescue and De Grey Rivers, and in the central Northern Territory. The associated habitat is spinifex and low shrubs.

== Behaviour ==
Adults have been observed from late December to February, their appearance probably dependent on summer monsoonal rains, the males emitting high-pitched buzzing calls.
