= Nanopsalta =

Scientific classification
- Kingdom: Animalia
- Phylum: Arthropoda
- Clade: Pancrustacea
- Class: Insecta
- Order: Hemiptera
- Suborder: Auchenorrhyncha
- Infraorder: Cicadomorpha
- Superfamily: Cicadoidea
- Family: Cicadidae
- Subfamily: Cicadettinae
- Genus: Nanopsalta; Moulds, 2012

Genus of cicadas

Nanopsalta is a genus of cicadas in the family Cicadidae, subfamily Cicadettinae and tribe Cicadettini. It was described in 2012 by Australian entomologist Maxwell Sydney Moulds.

== Etymology ==
The genus name Nanopsalta is a combination derived from Latin nanus (‘dwarf’ or ‘little’), with reference to the size of the type specimen, and psalta (from Latin psaltria – a female harpist), which is a suffix traditionally used in the generic names of cicadas.

== Species ==
As of 2025 there was one described species in the genus:

- Nanopsalta basalis (Goding & Froggatt, 1904) (Paperbark Tree-buzzer)
