= Erempsalta =

Scientific classification
- Kingdom: Animalia
- Phylum: Arthropoda
- Clade: Pancrustacea
- Class: Insecta
- Order: Hemiptera
- Suborder: Auchenorrhyncha
- Infraorder: Cicadomorpha
- Superfamily: Cicadoidea
- Family: Cicadidae
- Subfamily: Cicadettinae
- Genus: Erempsalta; Moulds, 2012

Genus of cicadas

Erempsalta is a monotypic genus of cicadas in the family Cicadidae, subfamily Cicadettinae and tribe Cicadettini. It was described in 2012 by Australian entomologist Maxwell Sydney Moulds. The single species occurs in Central Australia, with the type specimen collected at Hermannsburg.

== Etymology ==
The genus name Erempsalta is a combination derived from the Greek eremia ('solitude', 'desert' or 'wilderness'), with reference to the arid and isolated type locality, combined with Latin psalta (from psaltria, a female harpist) which is a traditional suffix for many cicada generic names.

== Species ==
As of 2025 there was one described species in the genus:

- Erempsalta hermannsburgensis (Distant, 1907) (Turkey Bush Cicada)
