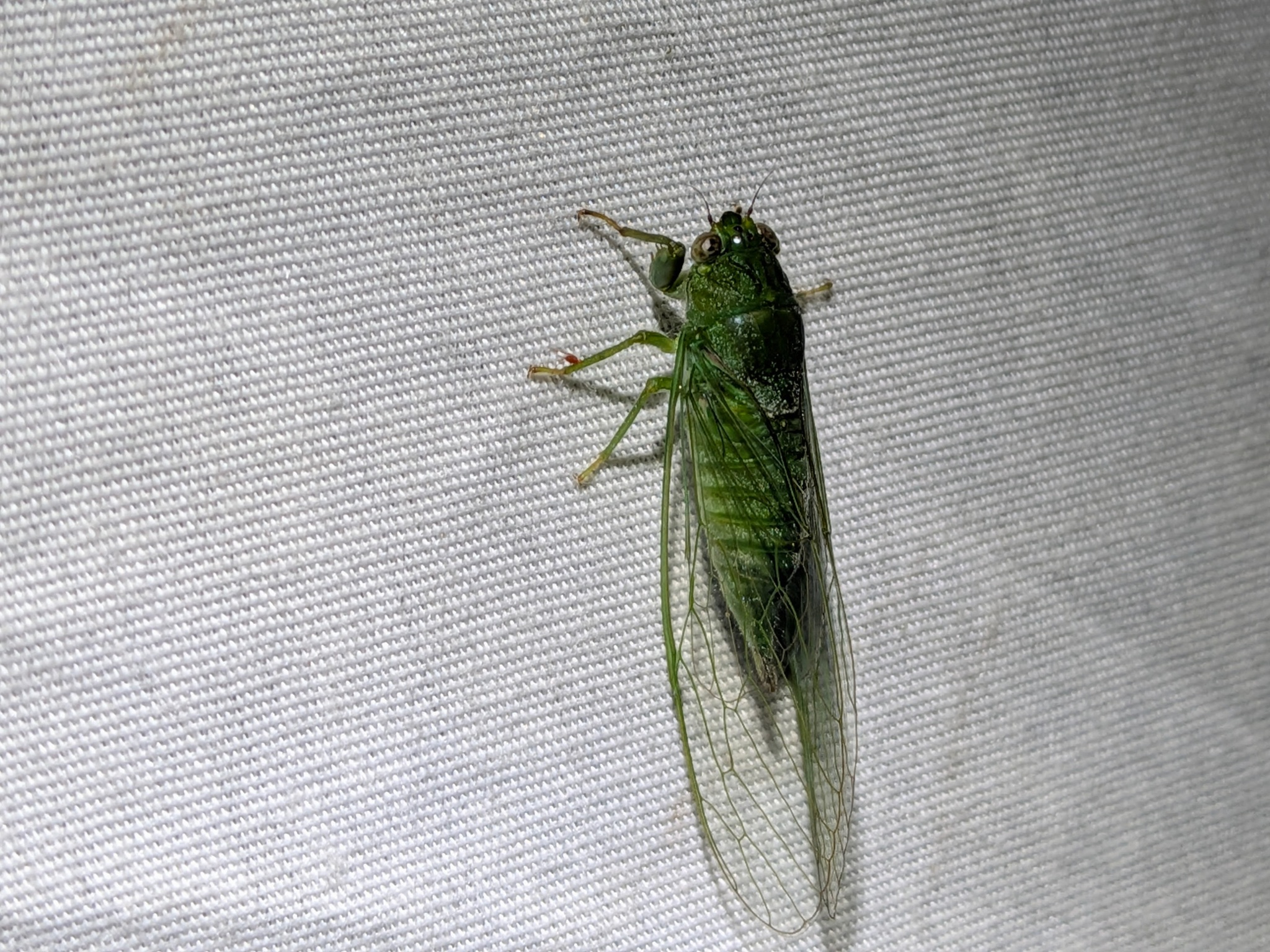
- Arfaka fulva

Scientific classification
- Kingdom: Animalia
- Phylum: Arthropoda
- Class: Insecta
- Order: Hemiptera
- Suborder: Auchenorrhyncha
- Family: Cicadidae
- Genus: Arfaka; Distant, 1905

= Arfaka =

Genus of insects

Arfaka is a genus of true bugs belonging to the family Cicadidae.

Species:

- Arfaka fulva Walker, 1870
- Arfaka hariola Stål, 1863
