= Heliopsalta =

Scientific classification
- Kingdom: Animalia
- Phylum: Arthropoda
- Clade: Pancrustacea
- Class: Insecta
- Order: Hemiptera
- Suborder: Auchenorrhyncha
- Infraorder: Cicadomorpha
- Superfamily: Cicadoidea
- Family: Cicadidae
- Subfamily: Cicadettinae
- Genus: Heliopsalta; Moulds, 2012

Genus of cicadas

Heliopsalta is a monotypic genus of cicadas in the family Cicadidae, subfamily Cicadettinae and tribe Cicadettini. It was described in 2012 by Australian entomologist Maxwell Sydney Moulds. The single species occurs in southern Queensland.

== Etymology ==
The genus name Heliopsalta is a combination of Greek helios (the sun), and psalta from Latin psaltria (a female harpist), a traditional suffix in the generic names of cicadas.

== Species ==
As of 2025 there was one described species in the genus:

- Heliopsalta polita (Popple, 2003) (Enamel Cicada)
