= Noongara =

Scientific classification
- Kingdom: Animalia
- Phylum: Arthropoda
- Clade: Pancrustacea
- Class: Insecta
- Order: Hemiptera
- Suborder: Auchenorrhyncha
- Infraorder: Cicadomorpha
- Superfamily: Cicadoidea
- Family: Cicadidae
- Subfamily: Cicadettinae
- Genus: Noongara; Moulds, 2012

Genus of cicadas

Noongara is a monotypic genus of cicadas in the family Cicadidae, subfamily Cicadettinae and tribe Cicadettini. It is endemic to Australia. It was described in 2012 by Australian entomologist Maxwell Sydney Moulds.

== Etymology ==
The genus name Noongara is derived from the name of the Noongar people of south-western Australia.

== Species ==
As of 2025 there was one described species in the genus:

- Noongara issoides (Distant, 1905) (Perth Stubby-wing)
