= Dipsopsalta =

Scientific classification
- Kingdom: Animalia
- Phylum: Arthropoda
- Clade: Pancrustacea
- Class: Insecta
- Order: Hemiptera
- Suborder: Auchenorrhyncha
- Infraorder: Cicadomorpha
- Superfamily: Cicadoidea
- Family: Cicadidae
- Subfamily: Cicadettinae
- Genus: Dipsopsalta; Moulds, 2012

Genus of cicadas

Dipsopsalta is a monotypic genus of cicadas in the family Cicadidae, subfamily Cicadettinae and tribe Cicadettini. It was described in 2012 by Australian entomologist Maxwell Sydney Moulds. The single species occurs in Western Australia.

== Etymology ==
The genus name Dipsopsalta is derived from the Greek dipsa ('dry' or 'thirsty'), with reference to the semi-arid habitat of the type species, combined with Latin psalta (from psaltria, a female harpist) which is a traditional suffix for many cicada generic names.

== Species ==
As of 2025 there was one described species in the genus:

- Dipsopsalta signata (Distant, 1914) (Desert Grass-buzzer)
