= Limnopsalta =

Scientific classification
- Kingdom: Animalia
- Phylum: Arthropoda
- Clade: Pancrustacea
- Class: Insecta
- Order: Hemiptera
- Suborder: Auchenorrhyncha
- Infraorder: Cicadomorpha
- Superfamily: Cicadoidea
- Family: Cicadidae
- Subfamily: Cicadettinae
- Genus: Limnopsalta; Moulds, 2012

Genus of cicadas

Limnopsalta is a monotypic genus of cicadas in the family Cicadidae, subfamily Cicadettinae and tribe Cicadettini. It was described in 2012 by Australian entomologist Maxwell Sydney Moulds. The single species occurs in coastal south-eastern Queensland.

== Etymology ==
The genus name Limnopsalta is a combination of Greek limno (‘marsh’ or ‘lake’), referring to the favoured habitat of the type species, and psalta from Latin psaltria (a female harpist), a traditional suffix in the generic names of cicadas.

== Species ==
As of 2025 there was one described species in the genus:

- Limnopsalta stradbrokensis (Distant, 1915) (Wallum Sedge-clicker)
