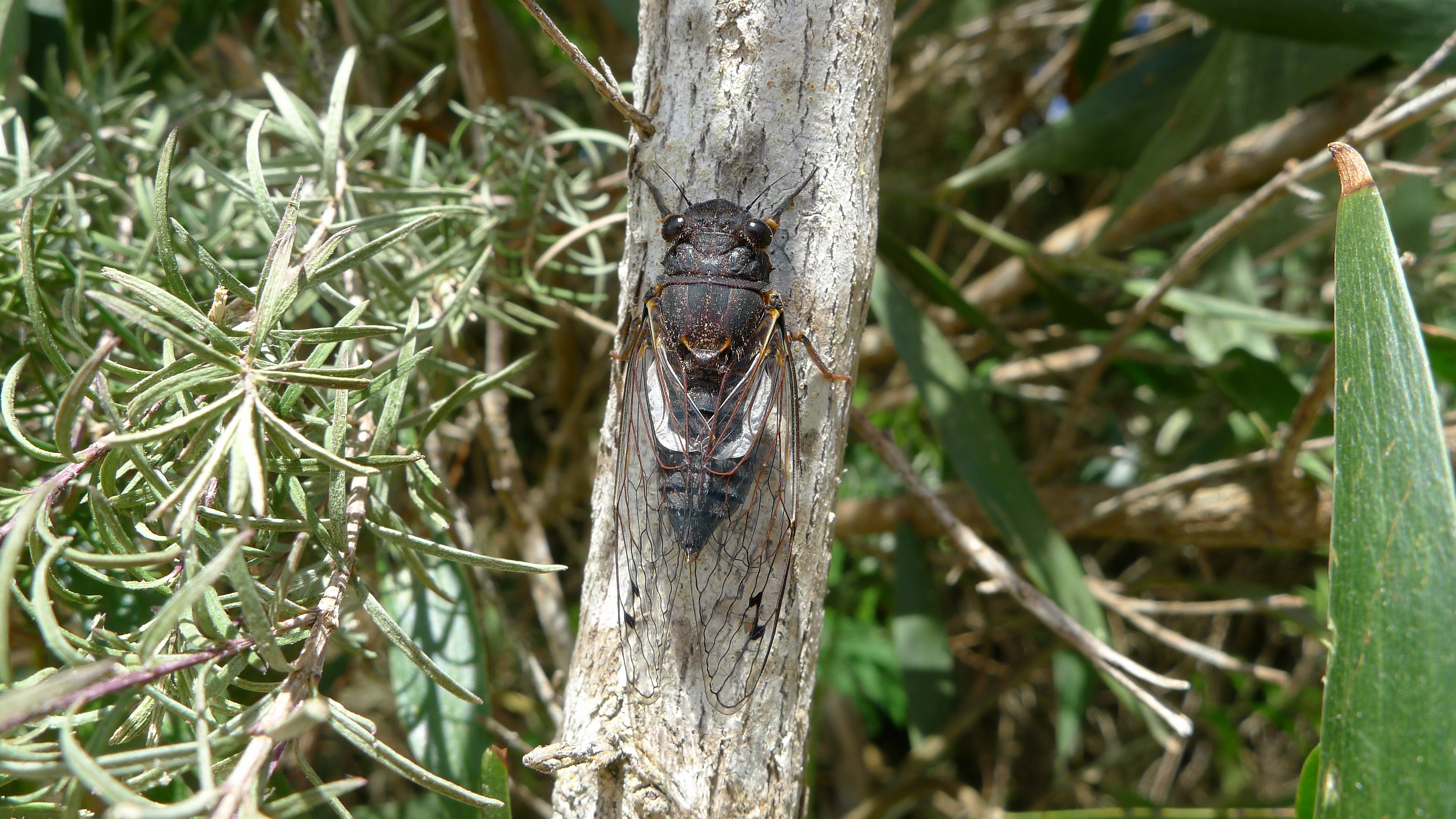

Scientific classification
- Kingdom: Animalia
- Phylum: Arthropoda
- Clade: Pancrustacea
- Class: Insecta
- Order: Hemiptera
- Suborder: Auchenorrhyncha
- Infraorder: Cicadomorpha
- Superfamily: Cicadoidea
- Family: Cicadidae
- Subfamily: Cicadettinae
- Genus: Gelidea; Moulds, 2012

= Gelidea =

Genus of cicadas

Gelidea is a monotypic genus of cicadas in the family Cicadidae, subfamily Cicadettinae and tribe Cicadettini. It was described in 2012 by Australian entomologist Maxwell Sydney Moulds. The single species occurs in southern Victoria and Tasmania.

== Etymology ==
The genus name Gelidea is derived from the Latin gelidus (‘cold’ or ‘frosty’), with reference to the cool temperate climate of the type locality.

== Species ==
As of 2025 there was one described species in the genus:

- Gelidea torrida (Erichson, 1842) (Southern Spotted Cicada, White Flash Cicada)
