= Neopunia =

Scientific classification
- Kingdom: Animalia
- Phylum: Arthropoda
- Clade: Pancrustacea
- Class: Insecta
- Order: Hemiptera
- Suborder: Auchenorrhyncha
- Infraorder: Cicadomorpha
- Superfamily: Cicadoidea
- Family: Cicadidae
- Subfamily: Cicadettinae
- Genus: Neopunia; Moulds, 2012

Genus of cicadas

Neopunia is a monotypic genus of cicadas in the family Cicadidae, subfamily Cicadettinae and tribe Cicadettini. It is endemic to Australia. It was described in 2012 by Australian entomologist Maxwell Sydney Moulds.

== Etymology ==
The genus name Neopunia is a combination derived from Greek neo (‘new’), and the cicada genus Punia, to which Neopunia is closely related.

== Species ==
As of 2025 there was one described species in the genus:

- Neopunia graminis (Goding & Froggatt, 1904) (Fluoro Grass Pixie)
