= Telmapsalta =

Scientific classification
- Kingdom: Animalia
- Phylum: Arthropoda
- Clade: Pancrustacea
- Class: Insecta
- Order: Hemiptera
- Suborder: Auchenorrhyncha
- Infraorder: Cicadomorpha
- Superfamily: Cicadoidea
- Family: Cicadidae
- Subfamily: Cicadettinae
- Genus: Telmapsalta; Moulds, 2012

Genus of cicadas

Telmapsalta is a genus of cicadas in the family Cicadidae, subfamily Cicadettinae and tribe Cicadettini. It is endemic to Australia. It was described in 2012 by Australian entomologist Maxwell Sydney Moulds.

== Etymology ==
The genus name Telmapsalta is a combination derived from Greek telma (‘pool’ or ‘marsh’), with reference to the swampy habitat of the type species, and psalta (from Latin psaltria – a female harpist), a suffix traditionally used in the names of many cicada genera.

== Species ==
As of 2025 there was one described species in the genus:

- Telmapsalta hackeri (Distant, 1915) (Paperbark Cicada)
