= Saticula (cicada) =

Scientific classification
- Kingdom: Animalia
- Phylum: Arthropoda
- Clade: Pancrustacea
- Class: Insecta
- Order: Hemiptera
- Suborder: Auchenorrhyncha
- Family: Cicadidae
- Genus: Saticula

Genus of true bugs

Saticula is a genus of cicadas in the family Cicadidae. There are at least two described species in Saticula.

== Species ==
These two species belong to the genus Saticula:

- Saticula coriaria Stal, 1866^{c g}
- Saticula vayssieresi Boulard, 1988^{c g}

Data sources: i = ITIS, c = Catalogue of Life, g = GBIF, b = Bugguide.net
