= Scolopita =

Scientific classification
- Domain: Eukaryota
- Kingdom: Animalia
- Phylum: Arthropoda
- Class: Insecta
- Order: Hemiptera
- Suborder: Auchenorrhyncha
- Family: Cicadidae
- Subfamily: Cicadettinae
- Tribe: Cicadettini
- Genus: Scolopita; Chou & Lei, 1997

Genus of true bugs

External image
- Images at iNaturalist

Scolopita is a genus of Asian cicadas in the tribe Cicadettini (subtribe Cicadettina), erected by Io Chou, Zhong-Ren Lei, et al. in 1997. Species have been recorded from China, Taiwan, Indochina and Malesia.

== Species ==
The Global Biodiversity Information Facility includes:

1. Scolopita cupis Chou & Lu, 1997
2. Scolopita fusca Chou & Lei, 1997
3. Scolopita lusiplex Chou & Lei, 1997
4. Scolopita mokanshanensis (Ôuchi, 1938)
