= Kanakia (cicada) =

Scientific classification
- Kingdom: Animalia
- Phylum: Arthropoda
- Clade: Pancrustacea
- Class: Insecta
- Order: Hemiptera
- Suborder: Auchenorrhyncha
- Family: Cicadidae
- Genus: Kanakia

Genus of true bugs

Kanakia is a genus of cicadas in the family Cicadidae. There are about seven described species in Kanakia.

== Species ==
These seven species belong to the genus Kanakia:

- Kanakia congrua Goding & Froggatt, 1904^{c g}
- Kanakia fuscocosta Delorme, 2016^{c g}
- Kanakia gigas Boulard, 1988^{c g}
- Kanakia paniensis Delorme, 2016^{c g}
- Kanakia rana Delorme, 2016^{c g}
- Kanakia salesnii Delorme, 2016^{c g}
- Kanakia typica Distant, 1892^{c g}

Data sources: i = ITIS, c = Catalogue of Life, g = GBIF, b = Bugguide.net
