= Caliginopsalta =

Scientific classification
- Kingdom: Animalia
- Phylum: Arthropoda
- Clade: Pancrustacea
- Class: Insecta
- Order: Hemiptera
- Suborder: Auchenorrhyncha
- Infraorder: Cicadomorpha
- Superfamily: Cicadoidea
- Family: Cicadidae
- Subfamily: Cicadettinae
- Genus: Caliginopsalta; Ewart, 2005

Genus of cicadas

Caliginopsalta is a genus of cicadas in the family Cicadidae, subfamily Cicadettinae and tribe Cicadettini. It is endemic to Australia. It was described in 2005 by Australian entomologist Anthony Ewart.

== Etymology ==
The genus name Caliginopsalta is a combination derived from Latin caligin (‘dark’ or ‘obscure’), with reference to the obscure habits and habitat of the type species, and psalta, a traditional suffix used in the generic names of many cicadas.

== Species ==
As of 2025 there was one described species in the genus:

- Caliginopsalta percola Ewart, 2005 (Royal Casuarina Ticker)

== Description ==
The length of the forewing is 12–16 mm.

== Distribution and habitat ==
The species occurs in the Brigalow Belt region from Marlborough in Queensland southwards to Barmedman in New South Wales. The associated habitat is woodland, especially with Casuarina cristata, on cracking clay soils.

== Behaviour ==
Adults may be heard from October to February, clinging to tree branches, uttering monotonous, double-clicking calls that may vary in speed.
