= Marteena =

Scientific classification
- Kingdom: Animalia
- Phylum: Arthropoda
- Clade: Pancrustacea
- Class: Insecta
- Order: Hemiptera
- Suborder: Auchenorrhyncha
- Family: Cicadidae
- Subfamily: Cicadettinae
- Genus: Marteena; Moulds, 1986

Genus of cicadas

Marteena is a genus of cicadas in the family Cicadidae, subfamily Cicadettinae and tribe Cicadettini. It is endemic to Australia. It was described in 1986 by Australian entomologist Maxwell Sydney Moulds.

== Species ==
As of 2025 there was one described species in the genus:

- Marteena rubricincta (Goding & Froggatt, 1904) (Mallee Chirper)
