= Clinata =

Scientific classification
- Kingdom: Animalia
- Phylum: Arthropoda
- Clade: Pancrustacea
- Class: Insecta
- Order: Hemiptera
- Suborder: Auchenorrhyncha
- Family: Cicadidae
- Subfamily: Cicadettinae
- Tribe: Cicadettini
- Genus: Clinata; Moulds, 2012

Genus of cicadas

Clinata is a genus of cicadas, also known as bent-winged clickers, in the family Cicadidae, subfamily Cicadettinae and tribe Cicadettini. It was described in 2012 by Australian entomologist Maxwell Sydney Moulds. The cicadas are found in the dryer parts of much of southern inland Australia.

== Etymology ==
The genus name Clinata is a derived from the Latin clinata (‘bent’ or ‘sloping’), with reference to the shape of the forewing costa.

== Species ==
As of 2025 there was one species in the genus:

- Clinata nodicosta (Goding & Froggatt, 1904) (Western Bent-winged Clicker)
