= Falcatpsalta =

Scientific classification
- Kingdom: Animalia
- Phylum: Arthropoda
- Clade: Pancrustacea
- Class: Insecta
- Order: Hemiptera
- Suborder: Auchenorrhyncha
- Family: Cicadidae
- Subfamily: Cicadettinae
- Genus: Falcatpsalta; Owen & Moulds, 2016

Genus of cicadas

Falcatpsalta is a genus of cicadas in the family Cicadidae, subfamily Cicadettinae and tribe Cicadettini. It is endemic to Australia. It was described in 2016 by entomologists Christopher Owen and Maxwell Sydney Moulds.

== Etymology ==
The genus name Falcatpsalta is a combination derived from Latin falcatus (‘sickle-shaped’), with reference to the shape of the upper pygofer lobes, and psalta, a traditional suffix used in the generic names of many cicada species.

== Species ==
As of 2025 there was one described species in the genus:

- Falcatpsalta aquilus (Ewart, 1989) (Sooty Squeaker)
