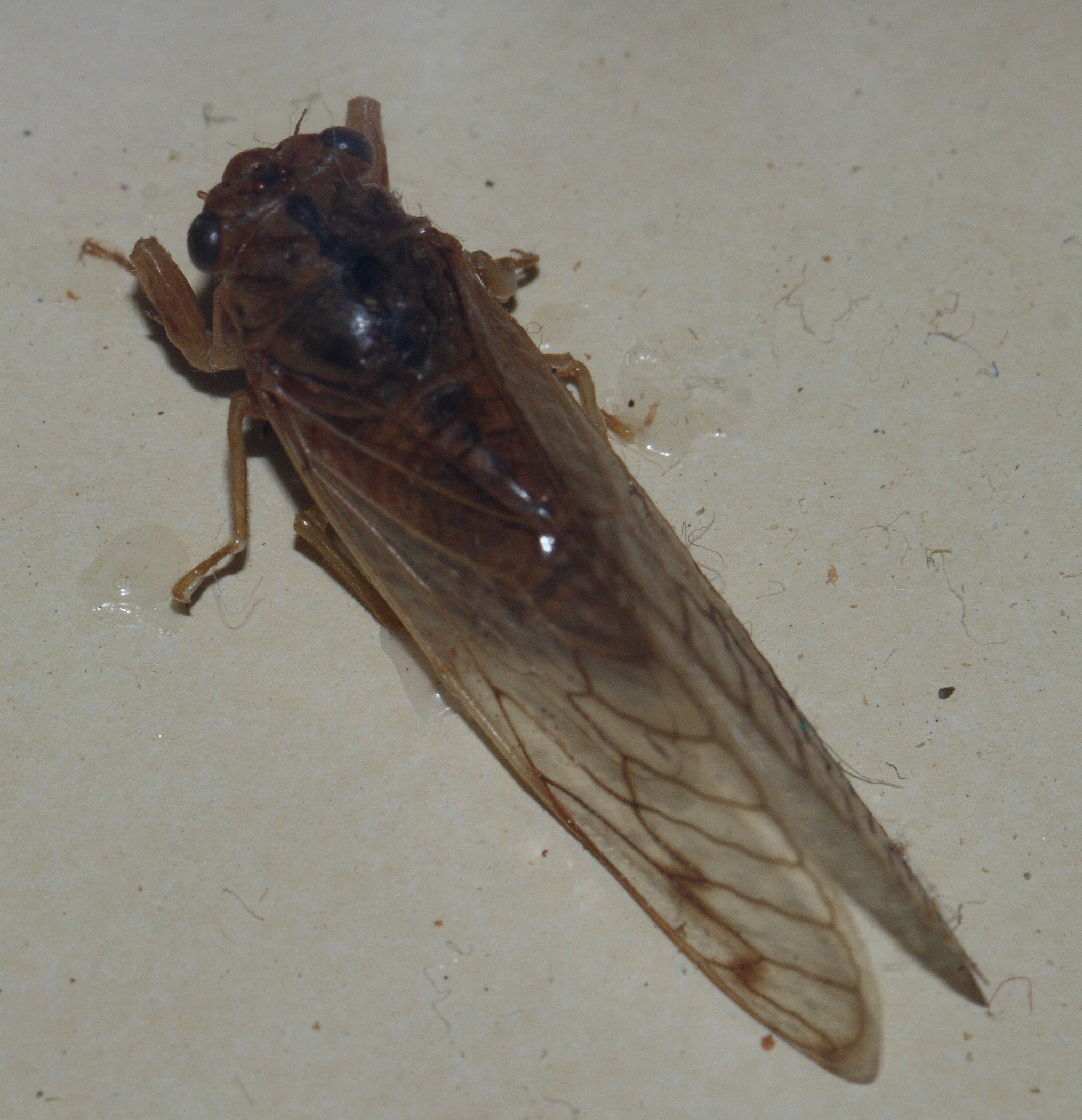
- Parnkalla muelleri

Scientific classification
- Kingdom: Animalia
- Phylum: Arthropoda
- Class: Insecta
- Order: Hemiptera
- Suborder: Auchenorrhyncha
- Family: Cicadidae
- Genus: Parnkalla; Distant, 1905

= Parnkalla (cicada) =

Genus of true bugs

Parnkalla is a genus of cicadas in the family Cicadidae.

== Species ==
There is at least one described species:

- Parnkalla muelleri (Distant, 1882) (Grass Faerie)
