= Relictapsalta =

Scientific classification
- Kingdom: Animalia
- Phylum: Arthropoda
- Clade: Pancrustacea
- Class: Insecta
- Order: Hemiptera
- Suborder: Auchenorrhyncha
- Family: Cicadidae
- Subfamily: Cicadettinae
- Genus: Relictapsalta; Owen & Moulds, 2016

Genus of cicadas

Relictapsalta is a genus of cicadas in the family Cicadidae, subfamily Cicadettinae and tribe Cicadettini. It is endemic to Australia. It was described in 2016 by entomologists Christopher Owen and Maxwell Sydney Moulds.

== Etymology ==
The genus name Relictapsalta is a combination derived from Latin relictus (‘left behind’), referring to the species’ presumed relictual status due to changing environmental conditions on the Cape York Peninsula over the past 30 Ma, with psalta, a traditional suffix used in the generic names of many cicadas.

== Species ==
As of 2025 there was one described species in the genus:

- Relictapsalta nigristriga (Goding & Froggatt, 1904) (Dusty Squawker)
