= Paradina =

Scientific classification
- Kingdom: Animalia
- Phylum: Arthropoda
- Clade: Pancrustacea
- Class: Insecta
- Order: Hemiptera
- Suborder: Auchenorrhyncha
- Family: Cicadidae
- Subfamily: Cicadettinae
- Genus: Paradina; Moulds, 2012

Genus of cicadas

Paradina is a monotypic genus of cicadas in the family Cicadidae, subfamily Cicadettinae and tribe Cicadettini. It is endemic to Australia. It was described in 2012 by Australian entomologist Maxwell Sydney Moulds.

== Etymology ==
The genus name Paradina is a combination derived from Greek para (‘near’ or ‘beside’) with dina, the last part of the name of the genus Mugadina, to which Paradina is closely related.

== Species ==
As of 2025 there was one described species in the genus:

- Paradina leichardti (Distant, 1882) (Black Grass-zipper)
