= Urabunana =

Scientific classification
- Kingdom: Animalia
- Phylum: Arthropoda
- Clade: Pancrustacea
- Class: Insecta
- Order: Hemiptera
- Suborder: Auchenorrhyncha
- Family: Cicadidae
- Subfamily: Cicadettinae
- Genus: Urabunana; Distant, 1905

Genus of cicadas

Urabunana is a genus of cicadas in the family Cicadidae, subfamily Cicadettinae and tribe Cicadettini. It is endemic to Australia. It was described in 1905 by English entomologist William Lucas Distant.

== Species ==
As of 2025 there was one described species in the genus:

- Urabunana sericeivitta (Walker, 1862) (Eastern Grass-buzzer)
