= Pipilopsalta =

Scientific classification
- Kingdom: Animalia
- Phylum: Arthropoda
- Clade: Pancrustacea
- Class: Insecta
- Order: Hemiptera
- Suborder: Auchenorrhyncha
- Family: Cicadidae
- Subfamily: Cicadettinae
- Genus: Pipilopsalta; Ewart, 2005

Genus of cicadas

Pipilopsalta is a genus of cicadas in the family Cicadidae, subfamily Cicadettinae and tribe Cicadettini. It is endemic to Australia. It was described in 2005 by Australian entomologist Anthony Ewart.

== Etymology ==
The genus name Pipilopsalta is a combination derived from pipilo (Latin: ‘chirp’), with reference to the sharp chirping song, and psalta, a traditional suffix used in the generic names of many cicada species.

== Species ==
As of 2025 there was one described species in the genus:

- Pipilopsalta ceuthoviridis Ewart, 2005 (Green Desert Ticker)
