= Adelia (cicada) =

Scientific classification
- Kingdom: Animalia
- Phylum: Arthropoda
- Clade: Pancrustacea
- Class: Insecta
- Order: Hemiptera
- Suborder: Auchenorrhyncha
- Family: Cicadidae
- Tribe: Cicadettini
- Genus: Adelia; Moulds, 2012

Genus of true bugs

Adelia is a genus of cicadas in the family Cicadidae. There is at least one described species.

== Species ==
- Adelia borealis (Goding & Froggatt, 1904) (Broad-winged Tiger)
