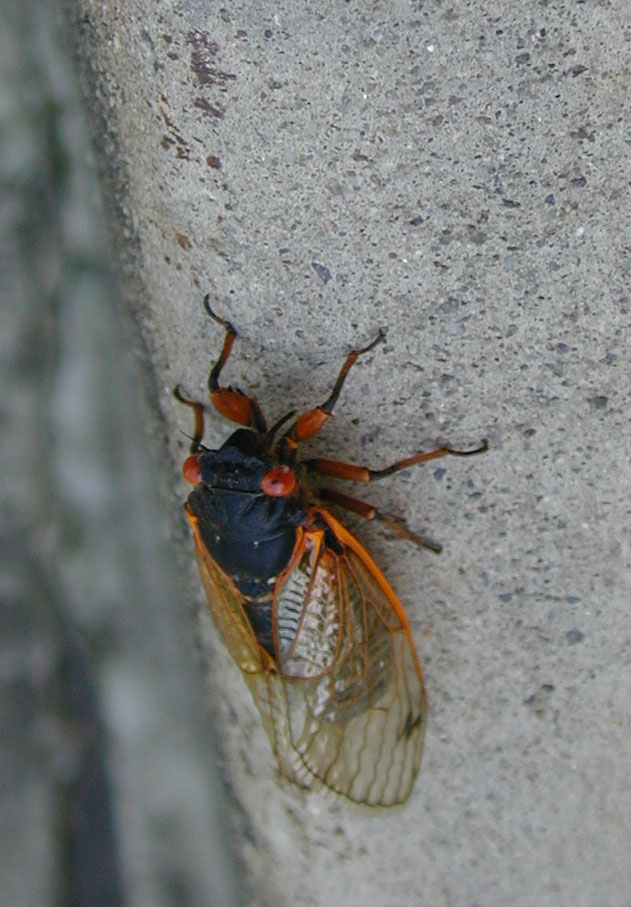
- A Magicicada species cicada

Scientific classification
- Domain: Eukaryota
- Kingdom: Animalia
- Phylum: Arthropoda
- Class: Insecta
- Order: Hemiptera
- Suborder: Auchenorrhyncha
- Infraorder: Cicadomorpha; Evans, 1946

Extant superfamilies
- Cercopoidea; Cicadoidea; Membracoidea

Synonyms
- Clypeorrhyncha Sorensen et al., 1995

= Cicadomorpha =

Cicadomorpha Temporal range: Upper Permian to Holocene

Infraorder of insects

Cicadomorpha is an infraorder of the insect order Hemiptera which contains the cicadas, leafhoppers, treehoppers, and spittlebugs. There are approximately 35,000 described species worldwide. Distributed worldwide, all members of this group are plant-feeders, and many produce either audible sounds or substrate vibrations as a form of communication. The earliest fossils of cicadomorphs first appear during the Late Permian. Notable extinct members include the "giant cicadas" belonging to Palaeontinidae.

== Classification ==
Some authors use the name Clypeorrhyncha (from the Latin clypeus and the Greek ῥύγχος rhúnkhos, 'shielded nose') as a replacement for the extant Cicadomorpha. Nymphs of many Cicadomorphans coat themselves with secretions from specialized Malphigian tubules. They are never coated with hydrophobic wax as seen in the nymphs of Fulgoromorpha. Most Cicadomorphas have a filter chamber in their mid-gut which helps remove excess water from the xylem or phloem sap that they feed on.

Of the three extant superfamilies within the Cicadomorpha, molecular phylogeny studies have placed Membracoidea as a sister group to a clade containing Cicadoidea and Cercopoidea. Within these superfamilies, not all deep phylogeny questions have been resolved.

Modified after Szwedo, 2018.

- †Infraorder Prosbolopsemorpha Szwedo, 2018
  - Superfamily † Prosbolopseoidea Becker-Migdisova, 1946
    - Family † Prosbolopseidae Becker-Migdisova, 1946 (Permian)
  - Superfamily † Pereborioidea Zalessky, 1930
    - † Curvicubitidae Hong, 1984 (Triassic)
    - † Ignotalidae Riek, 1973 (Permian-Triassic)
    - † Pereboriidae Zalessky, 1930 (Permian-Triassic)
  - Superfamily †Dysmorphoptiloidea Handlirsch, 1906
    - †Dysmorphoptilidae Handlirsch, 1906 (Permian- Jurassic)
    - †Eoscarterellidae Evans, 1956 (Permian-Triassic)
    - †Magnacicadiidae Hong & Chen, 1981 (Triassic)
  - Superfamily † Palaeontinoidea Handlirsch, 1906
    - † Dunstaniidae Tillyard, 1916 (Permian–Jurassic)
    - † Mesogereonidae Tillyard, 1921 (Triassic)
    - † Palaeontinidae Handlirsch, 1906 (Triassic–Cretaceous)
  - Superfamily † Hylicelloidea Evans, 1956
    - † Chiliocyclidae Evans, 1956; Triassic
    - † Hylicellidae Evans, 1956 (Triassic–Cretaceous)
    - † Mesojabloniidae Storozhenko, 1992 (Triassic)
- Clade Clypeata Qadri, 1967
  - Superfamily Cercopoidea Westwood, 1838
  - Superfamily Cicadoidea Latreille, 1802
  - Superfamily †Hylicelloidea Evans, 1956
    - † Chiliocyclidae Evans, 1956; Triassic
    - † Hylicellidae Evans, 1956 (Triassic–Cretaceous)
    - † Mesojabloniidae Storozhenko, 1992 (Triassic)
    - † Minlagerrontidae Chen, Szwedo and Wang, 2019 (Cretaceous)
  - Superfamily Membracoidea Rafinesque, 1815
