= Maxwell Sydney Moulds =

Australian entomologist specialising in cicadas

Maxwell Sydney Moulds (b. 1941) is an Australian entomologist. The majority of his books are written about cicadas. He led a morphological analysis that found that cicadas separate naturally into clades according to biogeographical area.

== Bibliography ==
- Bibliography of the Australian butterflies 1773–1973
- Australian Cicadas
- A Review of the Genera of Australian Cicadas
- Embedding Insects and Other Specimens in Clear Plastic
- The Higher Level Classification of Cicadas
- A Revision of the Cicada Genus Abricta Stål
- Labelling insect specimens
