= Punia =

Punia can refer to:

Settlements

- Punia, Democratic Republic of the Congo, a city
  - Punia Airport
  - Punia Territory
- Punia, Lithuania, a town

People

- Bajrang Punia (born 1994), an Indian politician and former freestyle wrestler
- Deepak Punia (cricketer) (born 1993), an Indian former cricketer
- Deepak Punia (wrestler) (born 1999), an Indian freestyle wrestler
- Ravi Kumar Punia (born 1993), an Indian Football Player
- K. R. Punia (1936–2025), an Indian politician
- Mandeep Punia, an Indian freelance journalist
- P. L. Punia (born 1945), an Indian politician
- Pavitra Punia (born 1986), an Indian actress
- Priya Punia (born 1996), an Indian cricketer
- Sapana Punia (born 1988), an Indian racewalker
- Savita Punia (born 1990), an Indian field hockey player
- Seema Punia, (born 1983), an Indian discus thrower
- Tanuj Punia (born 1985), an Indian politician

Other

- Punia (cicada), a genus of cicadas
  - Punia hyas, a species of cicada
  - Punia minima, a species of cicada
  - Punia kolos, a species of cicada
- Puniya, a surname
