= Yoyetta serrata =

Scientific classification
- Kingdom: Animalia
- Phylum: Arthropoda
- Clade: Pancrustacea
- Class: Insecta
- Order: Hemiptera
- Suborder: Auchenorrhyncha
- Family: Cicadidae
- Genus: Yoyetta
- Species: Y. serrata

Binomial name
- Yoyetta serrata Emery, Emery & Popple, 2019

Species of cicada

Yoyetta serrata is a species of cicada, also known as the serrated firetail, in the true cicada family, Cicadettinae subfamily and Cicadettini tribe. The species is endemic to Australia. It was described in 2019 by Australian entomologists David L. Emery, Nathan J. Emery and Lindsay Popple.

== Etymology ==
The specific epithet serrata, from Latin serratus (“serrated”), refers to the sharp-edged yellow markings on the lateral edges of the abdomen of the species.

== Description ==
The length of the forewing is 24–31 mm. Body length is 19–25 mm.

== Distribution and habitat ==
The species occurs from Canberra and the Brindabella Range in the Australian Capital Territory, southwards through the South Eastern Highlands bioregion to Bemm River, and westwards to Gisborne, Victoria. The associated habitat is cool temperate eucalypt forest and woodland.

== Behaviour ==
Adult males may be heard while clinging to the trunks and upper branches of eucalypts, emitting rapid, high-pitched, ticking and chirping calls.
