= Ewartia cuensis =

Scientific classification
- Kingdom: Animalia
- Phylum: Arthropoda
- Clade: Pancrustacea
- Class: Insecta
- Order: Hemiptera
- Suborder: Auchenorrhyncha
- Family: Cicadidae
- Genus: Ewartia
- Species: E. cuensis

Binomial name
- Ewartia cuensis (Distant, 1913)

Synonyms
- Melampsalta cuensis Distant, 1913; Cicadetta cuensis (Distant, 1913)

Species of cicada

Ewartia cuensis is a species of cicada, also known as the western wattle cicada, in the true cicada family, Cicadettinae subfamily and Cicadettini tribe. It is endemic to Australia. It was described in 1913 by English entomologist William Lucas Distant.

== Description ==
The length of the forewing is 19–23 mm.

== Distribution and habitat ==
The species occurs in central-west Western Australia from Cue to Yalgoo. Its associated habitat is low shrubland dominated by wattles and emu bush.

== Behaviour ==
Adults are heard from January to February, clinging to the stems of wattles and other shrubs, uttering rapid, high-pitched, chirping calls.
