= Ewartia carina =

Scientific classification
- Kingdom: Animalia
- Phylum: Arthropoda
- Clade: Pancrustacea
- Class: Insecta
- Order: Hemiptera
- Suborder: Auchenorrhyncha
- Family: Cicadidae
- Genus: Ewartia
- Species: E. carina

Binomial name
- Ewartia carina Popple, 2017

Species of cicada

Ewartia carina is a species of cicada, also known as the Cape York wattle cicada, in the true cicada family, Cicadettinae subfamily and Cicadettini tribe. It is endemic to Australia. It was described in 2017 by Australian entomologist Lindsay Popple.

== Description ==
The length of the forewing is 19–25 mm.

== Distribution and habitat ==
The species’ known distribution is restricted to the McIlwraith and Iron Ranges on the Cape York Peninsula of Far North Queensland. Its associated habitat is dry rainforests and vine thickets.

== Behaviour ==
Adults have been heard in January, uttering high-pitched calls.
