= Yoyetta nigrimontana =

Scientific classification
- Kingdom: Animalia
- Phylum: Arthropoda
- Clade: Pancrustacea
- Class: Insecta
- Order: Hemiptera
- Suborder: Auchenorrhyncha
- Family: Cicadidae
- Genus: Yoyetta
- Species: Y. nigrimontana

Binomial name
- Yoyetta nigrimontana Emery, Emery & Popple, 2015

Species of cicada

Yoyetta nigrimontana is a species of cicada, also known as the small southern ambertail, in the true cicada family, Cicadettinae subfamily and Cicadettini tribe. The species is endemic to Australia. It was described in 2015 by Australian entomologists Nathan J. Emery, David L. Emery and Lindsay Popple.

== Description ==
The length of the forewing is 18–22 mm.

== Distribution and habitat ==
The species occurs in Canberra in the Australian Capital Territory. The associated habitat is eucalypt woodland with a shrubby understorey.

== Behaviour ==
Adult males may be heard in November and December, clinging to the main trunks and branches of eucalypts, and sometimes to power poles, emitting repetitive ticking calls.
