= Yoyetta loftyensis =

Scientific classification
- Kingdom: Animalia
- Phylum: Arthropoda
- Clade: Pancrustacea
- Class: Insecta
- Order: Hemiptera
- Suborder: Auchenorrhyncha
- Family: Cicadidae
- Genus: Yoyetta
- Species: Y. loftyensis

Binomial name
- Yoyetta loftyensis Popple & Emery, 2020

Species of cicada

Yoyetta loftyensis is a species of cicada, also known as the Mount Lofty firetail, in the true cicada family, Cicadettinae subfamily and Cicadettini tribe. The species is endemic to Australia. It was described in 2020 by Australian entomologists Lindsay Popple and David L. Emery.

== Etymology ==
The specific epithet loftyensis refers to the Mount Lofty Ranges, near Adelaide, where the species is abundant.

== Description ==
The length of the forewing is 25–31 mm. Body length is 21–28 mm.

== Distribution and habitat ==
The species occurs in South Australia in the greater Adelaide region and northwards to Wilmington. Associated habitats include tall eucalypt forest and woodland.

== Behaviour ==
Adult males may be heard while clinging high in the upper branches of eucalypts, emitting rapid, high-pitched ticking and chirping calls.
