= Yoyetta enigmatica =

Scientific classification
- Kingdom: Animalia
- Phylum: Arthropoda
- Clade: Pancrustacea
- Class: Insecta
- Order: Hemiptera
- Suborder: Auchenorrhyncha
- Family: Cicadidae
- Genus: Yoyetta
- Species: Y. enigmatica

Binomial name
- Yoyetta enigmatica Popple & Emery, 2020

Species of cicada

Yoyetta enigmatica is a species of cicada, also known as the restless firetail, in the true cicada family, Cicadettinae subfamily and Cicadettini tribe. The species is endemic to Australia. It was described in 2020 by Australian entomologists Lindsay Popple and David L. Emery.

== Etymology ==
The specific epithet enigmatica (Latin: “baffling” or “inexplicable”) refers to the species' habit of suddenly appearing and calling in flight before disappearing again, making the cicadas very difficult to observe or capture.

== Description ==
The length of the forewing is 27–30 mm. Body length is 22–25 mm.

== Distribution and habitat ==
The species occurs in mountainous areas above 800 m elevation, including Springbrook and Lamington National Parks in Queensland, and Barrington Tops, Ebor, Ben Lomond and Mount Kaputar in New South Wales. Associated habitats include open eucalypt forest and heath with emergent eucalypts.

== Behaviour ==
Adult males may be heard from October to January, clinging to the upper branches of eucalypts, emitting rasping "zip" calls, mainly in flight.
