= Atrapsalta siccana =

Scientific classification
- Kingdom: Animalia
- Phylum: Arthropoda
- Clade: Pancrustacea
- Class: Insecta
- Order: Hemiptera
- Suborder: Auchenorrhyncha
- Family: Cicadidae
- Genus: Atrapsalta
- Species: A. siccana

Binomial name
- Atrapsalta siccana (Ewart), 1989

Synonyms
- Pauropsalta siccanus Ewart, 1989

Species of cicada

Atrapsalta siccana is a species of cicada, also known as the bulloak squeaker, in the true cicada family, Cicadettinae subfamily and Cicadettini tribe. It is endemic to Australia. It was described in 1989 by Australian entomologist Anthony Ewart.

== Etymology ==
The specific epithet siccana is derived from Latin siccanus ('dry'), with reference to the species' habitat.

== Description ==
The length of the forewing is 15–17 mm.

== Distribution and habitat ==
The species occurs in inland Queensland, from Hughenden southwards to Goondiwindi. The holotype was collected some 15 km south of Wyseby Junction, on the Injune–Rolleston road. The associated habitat includes low woodland dominated by Allocasuarina luehmannii (bulloak). Adults are typically found on bulloak or sometimes on black cypress.

== Behaviour ==
Adults are heard from December to February, the males clinging to the main trunks of the trees, uttering a monotonous series of single, sharp notes. The females oviposit on the outer branches.
