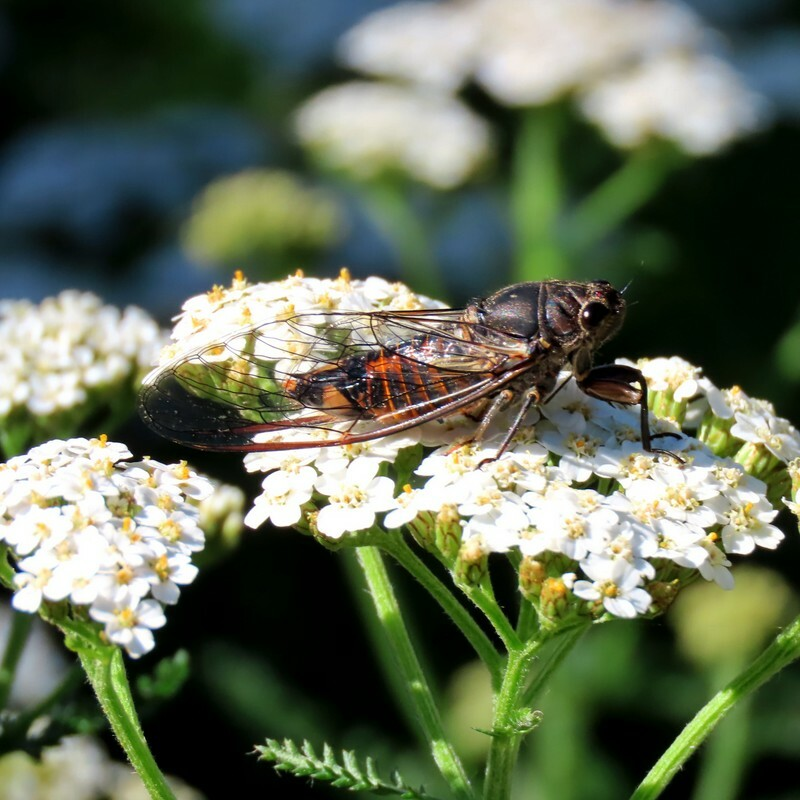

Scientific classification
- Kingdom: Animalia
- Phylum: Arthropoda
- Clade: Pancrustacea
- Class: Insecta
- Order: Hemiptera
- Suborder: Auchenorrhyncha
- Family: Cicadidae
- Genus: Yoyetta
- Species: Y. robertsonae

Binomial name
- Yoyetta robertsonae Moulds, Popple & Emery, 2020

= Yoyetta robertsonae =

Species of cicada

Yoyetta robertsonae is a species of cicada, also known as the clicking ambertail, in the true cicada family, Cicadettinae subfamily and Cicadettini tribe. The species is endemic to Australia. It was described in 2020 by Australian entomologists Maxwell Sydney Moulds, Lindsay Popple and David L. Emery.

== Etymology ==
The specific epithet robertsonae honours Susan Robertson, who collected some of the original specimens of the species, for her contributions to understanding the cicadas of the Australian Capital Territory.

== Description ==
The length of the forewing is 24–33 mm. Body length is 21–25 mm.

== Distribution and habitat ==
The species occurs in eastern Australia, west of the Great Dividing Range, from Barrington Tops in New South Wales southwards through the Australian Capital Territory to near Melbourne in Victoria. The associated habitat is cool temperate eucalypt woodland and open forest.

== Behaviour ==
Adult males may be heard while clinging to the stems and branches of eucalypts, emitting clicking calls interspersed with low-pitched "zeep-zeep" phrases.
