= Yoyetta crepita =

Scientific classification
- Kingdom: Animalia
- Phylum: Arthropoda
- Clade: Pancrustacea
- Class: Insecta
- Order: Hemiptera
- Suborder: Auchenorrhyncha
- Family: Cicadidae
- Genus: Yoyetta
- Species: Y. crepita

Binomial name
- Yoyetta crepita Emery, 2025

Species of cicada

Yoyetta crepita is a species of cicada in the true cicada family, Cicadettinae subfamily and Cicadettini tribe. The species is endemic to Australia. It was described in 2025 by Australian entomologist David L. Emery.

== Etymology ==
The specific epithet crepita (Latin: “rattle” or “crackle”) refers to the crackling chorus of the calls emitted by the males on sunny days.

== Distribution and habitat ==
The species occurs around Kandos and Clandulla in the Bylong Valley, on the western slopes of the Great Dividing Range in New South Wales. The holotype specimen was collected at Clandulla.
