= Atrapsalta corticina =

Scientific classification
- Kingdom: Animalia
- Phylum: Arthropoda
- Clade: Pancrustacea
- Class: Insecta
- Order: Hemiptera
- Suborder: Auchenorrhyncha
- Family: Cicadidae
- Genus: Atrapsalta
- Species: A. corticina

Binomial name
- Atrapsalta corticina (Ewart), 1989

Synonyms
- Pauropsalta corticinus Ewart, 1989

Species of cicada

Atrapsalta corticina is a species or species complex of cicadas, also known as bark squeakers, in the Cicadidae family, Cicadettinae subfamily and Cicadettini tribe. It is endemic to Australia. It was described in 1989 by Australian entomologist Anthony Ewart.

== Etymology ==
The specific epithet corticina is derived from Latin corticosus ('abounding in tree bark').

== Description ==
The length of the forewing is 16–20 mm.

== Distribution and habitat ==
The species complex occurs from central to south-eastern Queensland, southwards into north-eastern New South Wales, as well as in central New South Wales southwards to the northern Victorian border. The holotype was collected at Beerburrum some 60 km north of Brisbane. The associated habitat includes open eucalypt forest and woodland with Eucalyptus tereticornis and Eucalyptus moluccana, especially in riparian areas.

== Behaviour ==
Adults are heard from September to April, clinging to the foliage and branches of eucalypts and heath shrubs, uttering calls characterised by short chirps followed by a brief buzz.
