= Yoyetta tristrigata =

Scientific classification
- Kingdom: Animalia
- Phylum: Arthropoda
- Clade: Pancrustacea
- Class: Insecta
- Order: Hemiptera
- Suborder: Auchenorrhyncha
- Family: Cicadidae
- Genus: Yoyetta
- Species: Y. tristrigata

Binomial name
- Yoyetta tristrigata (Goding & Froggatt, 1904)

Synonyms
- Melampsalta tristrigata Goding & Froggatt, 1904; Cicadetta tristrigata (Goding & Froggatt, 1904)

Species of cicada

Yoyetta tristrigata is a species of cicada, also known as the tropical ambertail, in the true cicada family, Cicadettinae subfamily and Cicadettini tribe. The species is endemic to Australia. It was described in 1904 by entomologists Frederic Webster Goding and Walter Wilson Froggatt.

== Description ==
The length of the forewing is 20–26 mm.

== Distribution and habitat ==
The species occurs in tropical eastern Queensland from Julatten southwards to Rockhampton. Associated habitats include open forest, parkland and gardens.

== Behaviour ==
Adult males are heard from October to April, clinging to the trunks and upper branches of eucalypts, emitting repetitive ticking calls.
