= Yoyetta delicata =

Scientific classification
- Kingdom: Animalia
- Phylum: Arthropoda
- Clade: Pancrustacea
- Class: Insecta
- Order: Hemiptera
- Suborder: Auchenorrhyncha
- Family: Cicadidae
- Genus: Yoyetta
- Species: Y. delicata

Binomial name
- Yoyetta delicata Popple & Emery, 2022

Species of cicada

Yoyetta delicata is a species of cicada, also known as the delicate ambertail, in the true cicada family, Cicadettinae subfamily and Cicadettini tribe. The species is endemic to Australia. It was described in 2022 by Australian entomologists Lindsay Popple and David L. Emery.

== Etymology ==
The specific epithet delicata (Latin: “delicate”) refers to the slender appearance of the cicadas compared with their congeners.

== Description ==
The length of the forewing is 18–22 mm.

== Distribution and habitat ==
The species occurs from southern Queensland southwards to Armidale and Wyong in New South Wales. The associated habitat is tall open eucalypt forest.

== Behaviour ==
Adult males may be heard from November to January, clinging high on the trunks and branches of eucalypts, emitting buzzing and tinkling calls.
