= Yoyetta electrica =

Scientific classification
- Kingdom: Animalia
- Phylum: Arthropoda
- Clade: Pancrustacea
- Class: Insecta
- Order: Hemiptera
- Suborder: Auchenorrhyncha
- Family: Cicadidae
- Genus: Yoyetta
- Species: Y. electrica

Binomial name
- Yoyetta electrica Emery, Emery & Popple, 2019

Species of cicada

Yoyetta electrica is a species of cicada, also known as the rattling firetail, in the true cicada family, Cicadettinae subfamily and Cicadettini tribe. The species is endemic to Australia. It was described in 2019 by Australian entomologists David L. Emery, Nathan J. Emery and Lindsay Popple.

== Etymology ==
The specific epithet electrica refers to the calling songs, the sound of which, with many males calling together, is likened to that made by high voltage power transmission lines.

== Description ==
The length of the forewing is 20–24 mm.

== Distribution and habitat ==
The species occurs at Mount Mellum in south-east Queensland and between Woodburn and Woolgoolga in northern New South Wales. Associated habitats include eucalypt forest and parkland on coastal floodplains.

== Behaviour ==
Adult males may be heard from November to January, clinging to the trunks and upper branches of eucalypts, emitting rapid clicking and rattling calls.
