= Yoyetta australicta =

Scientific classification
- Kingdom: Animalia
- Phylum: Arthropoda
- Clade: Pancrustacea
- Class: Insecta
- Order: Hemiptera
- Suborder: Auchenorrhyncha
- Family: Cicadidae
- Genus: Yoyetta
- Species: Y. australicta

Binomial name
- Yoyetta australicta Popple & Emery, 2022

Species of cicada

Yoyetta australicta is a species of cicada, also known as the southern ticking ambertail, in the true cicada family, Cicadettinae subfamily and Cicadettini tribe. The species is endemic to Australia. It was described in 2022 by Australian entomologists Lindsay Popple and David L. Emery.

== Etymology ==
The specific epithet australicta (Latin: “southern” + “pulse”) refers both to the southern distribution of the species and to the structure of its song.

== Description ==
The length of the forewing is 24–27 mm.

== Distribution and habitat ==
The species occurs in New South Wales from near Coonabarabran southwards to Tallaganda National Park, as well as in the Australian Capital Territory. It is also found in South Australia from Wilpena Pound in the Flinders Ranges southwards to Mount Barker. Associated habitats include eucalypt woodland and parkland.

== Behaviour ==
Adult males may be heard from October to January, clinging to the stems and upper branches of eucalypts, or in flight, emitting sharp ticking or pulsing calls.
