= Yoyetta regalis =

Scientific classification
- Kingdom: Animalia
- Phylum: Arthropoda
- Clade: Pancrustacea
- Class: Insecta
- Order: Hemiptera
- Suborder: Auchenorrhyncha
- Family: Cicadidae
- Genus: Yoyetta
- Species: Y. regalis

Binomial name
- Yoyetta regalis Emery, Emery & Popple, 2019

Species of cicada

Yoyetta regalis is a species of cicada, also known as the red ringer, in the true cicada family, Cicadettinae subfamily and Cicadettini tribe. The species is endemic to Australia. It was described in 2019 by Australian entomologists David L. Emery, Nathan J. Emery and Lindsay Popple.

== Etymology ==
The specific epithet regalis (Latin: “royal” or “kingly”) refers to the colouration and song of the species, as well as to its abundance in the Royal National Park south of Sydney.

== Description ==
The length of the forewing is 27–34 mm. Body length is 23–29 mm.

== Distribution and habitat ==
The species occurs from the Greater Sydney region westwards to Bathurst in central New South Wales, with an isolated population in West Gippsland, Victoria. The associated habitat is eucalypt forest or woodland with a shrubby or heathy understorey.

== Behaviour ==
Adult males may be heard from December to February, clinging to the stems and upper branches of eucalypts and large shrubs, emitting high-frequency fluttering calls.
