= Ewartia lapidosa =

Scientific classification
- Kingdom: Animalia
- Phylum: Arthropoda
- Clade: Pancrustacea
- Class: Insecta
- Order: Hemiptera
- Suborder: Auchenorrhyncha
- Family: Cicadidae
- Genus: Ewartia
- Species: E. lapidosa

Binomial name
- Ewartia lapidosa Popple, 2017

Species of cicada

Ewartia lapidosa is a species of cicada, also known as the inland wattle cicada, in the true cicada family, Cicadettinae subfamily and Cicadettini tribe. It is endemic to Australia. It was described in 2017 by Australian entomologist Lindsay Popple.

== Description ==
The length of the forewing is 20–26 mm.

== Distribution and habitat ==
The species occurs in inland areas of eastern Australia, from Georgetown in northern Queensland southwards to central New South Wales. Its associated habitat includes woodlands with wattle trees, often in rocky areas or with stony soils.

== Behaviour ==
Adults are heard from September to March, clinging to the stems and branches of wattles, uttering lilting calls as well as monotonous, repetitive chirps.
