= Yoyetta corindi =

Scientific classification
- Kingdom: Animalia
- Phylum: Arthropoda
- Clade: Pancrustacea
- Class: Insecta
- Order: Hemiptera
- Suborder: Auchenorrhyncha
- Family: Cicadidae
- Genus: Yoyetta
- Species: Y. corindi

Binomial name
- Yoyetta corindi Popple & Emery, 2022

Species of cicada

Yoyetta corindi is a species of cicada, also known as the North Coast ambertail, in the true cicada family, Cicadettinae subfamily and Cicadettini tribe. The species is endemic to Australia. It was described in 2022 by Australian entomologists Lindsay Popple and David L. Emery.

== Etymology ==
The specific epithet corindi refers to the Corindi River, which is adjacent to the type locality.

== Description ==
The length of the forewing is 19–31 mm.

== Distribution and habitat ==
The species occurs in north-eastern New South Wales. The associated habitat is open forest with a mid-dense shrub layer.

== Behaviour ==
Adult males may be heard from October to March, clinging to the branches of trees and shrubs, or in flight, emitting buzzing or clicking calls.
