= Ewartia roberti =

Scientific classification
- Kingdom: Animalia
- Phylum: Arthropoda
- Clade: Pancrustacea
- Class: Insecta
- Order: Hemiptera
- Suborder: Auchenorrhyncha
- Family: Cicadidae
- Genus: Ewartia
- Species: E. roberti

Binomial name
- Ewartia roberti Popple, 2017

Species of cicada

Ewartia roberti is a species of cicada, also known as the thin-striped wattle cicada, in the true cicada family, Cicadettinae subfamily and Cicadettini tribe. It is endemic to Australia. It was described in 2017 by Australian entomologist Lindsay Popple.

== Description ==
The length of the forewing is 19–27 mm.

== Distribution and habitat ==
The species occurs in south-eastern Queensland and north-eastern New South Wales. Its associated habitat includes the lower to middle storey of open forest with wattle trees, as well as gardens, including Toowoomba and the Brisbane suburbs.

== Behaviour ==
Adults are heard from September to April, clinging to the trunks, stems and branches of wattles, uttering a variety of buzzing and chirping calls.
