= Yoyetta humphreyae =

Scientific classification
- Kingdom: Animalia
- Phylum: Arthropoda
- Clade: Pancrustacea
- Class: Insecta
- Order: Hemiptera
- Suborder: Auchenorrhyncha
- Family: Cicadidae
- Genus: Yoyetta
- Species: Y. humphreyae

Binomial name
- Yoyetta humphreyae Moulds & Popple, 2018

Species of cicada

Yoyetta humphreyae is a species of cicada, also known as the varied ambertail, in the true cicada family, Cicadettinae subfamily and Cicadettini tribe. The species is endemic to Australia. It was described in 2018 by Australian entomologists Maxwell Sydney Moulds and Lindsay Popple.

== Description ==
The length of the forewing is 20–30 mm.

== Distribution and habitat ==
The species occurs in New South Wales, from southern Sydney westwards to the Blue Mountains and northwards to Port Macquarie, with an isolated population west of Coonabarabran in the Warrumbungles. The associated habitat is open forest with a shrubby understorey.

== Behaviour ==
Adult males may be heard from October to January, clinging to the branches of trees and shrubs, emitting ticking and buzzing calls.
