= Atrapsalta encaustica =

Scientific classification
- Kingdom: Animalia
- Phylum: Arthropoda
- Clade: Pancrustacea
- Class: Insecta
- Order: Hemiptera
- Suborder: Auchenorrhyncha
- Family: Cicadidae
- Genus: Atrapsalta
- Species: A. encaustica

Binomial name
- Atrapsalta encaustica (Germar, 1834)

Synonyms
- Cicada encaustica Germar, 1834; Cicada arclus Walker, 1850; Cicada juvenis Walker, 1850

Species of cicada

Atrapsalta encaustica is a species of cicada, also known as the black squeaker, in the true cicada family, Cicadettinae subfamily and Cicadettini tribe. It is endemic to Australia. It was described in 1834 by German entomologist Ernst Friedrich Germar.

== Description ==
The length of the forewing is 15–18 mm.

== Distribution and habitat ==
The species occurs in some elevated areas of south-eastern Queensland, the Warrumbungles, Pilliga Scrub and Blue Mountains of New South Wales, the range extending southwards along the coast to the Victorian border. The associated habitat includes open forest as well as both montane heath and coastal temperate heathland.

== Behaviour ==
Adults are heard from September to March, the males clinging to the trunks of eucalypts, uttering high-pitched calls in bright sunshine.
