= Yoyetta grandis =

Scientific classification
- Kingdom: Animalia
- Phylum: Arthropoda
- Clade: Pancrustacea
- Class: Insecta
- Order: Hemiptera
- Suborder: Auchenorrhyncha
- Family: Cicadidae
- Genus: Yoyetta
- Species: Y. grandis

Binomial name
- Yoyetta grandis Emery, Emery & Popple, 2019

Species of cicada

Yoyetta grandis is a species of cicada, also known as the red-eyed firetail, in the true cicada family, Cicadettinae subfamily and Cicadettini tribe. The species is endemic to Australia. It was described in 2019 by Australian entomologists David L. Emery, Nathan J. Emery and Lindsay Popple.

== Description ==
The length of the forewing is 28–35 mm.

== Distribution and habitat ==
The species occurs from the Brindabella Range in the Australian Capital Territory southwards to Lakes Entrance in eastern Victoria and westwards to the Otway and Grampian ranges. The associated habitat is tall eucalypt forest.

== Behaviour ==
Adult males may be heard from December to January, clinging to the stems and upper branches of eucalypts, including alpine ash trees, emitting loud, sharp, ticking calls.
