= Diemeniana neboissi =

Scientific classification
- Kingdom: Animalia
- Phylum: Arthropoda
- Clade: Pancrustacea
- Class: Insecta
- Order: Hemiptera
- Suborder: Auchenorrhyncha
- Family: Cicadidae
- Genus: Diemeniana
- Species: D. neboissi

Binomial name
- Diemeniana neboissi Burns, 1958

Species of cicada

Diemeniana neboissi is a species of cicada, also known as the auburn crop duster, in the true cicada family, Cicadettinae subfamily and Cicadettini tribe. It is endemic to Australia. It was described in 1958 by Australian entomologist Alexander Noble Burns.

== Description ==
The length of the forewing is 18–22 mm.

== Distribution and habitat ==
The species has a restricted range in the Australian Alps bioregion, in valleys west of Kosciuzsko National Park. The associated habitat is closed grassland.

== Behaviour ==
Adults are heard in December and January, clinging to grass stems, uttering short buzzing calls ending with a stutter.
