= Simona erema =

Scientific classification
- Kingdom: Animalia
- Phylum: Arthropoda
- Clade: Pancrustacea
- Class: Insecta
- Order: Hemiptera
- Suborder: Auchenorrhyncha
- Family: Cicadidae
- Genus: Simona
- Species: S. erema

Binomial name
- Simona erema Ewart, Popple & Marshall, 2015

Species of cicada

Simona erema is a species of cicada, also known as the roaring senna cicada, in the true cicada family, Cicadettinae subfamily and Cicadettini tribe. The species is endemic to Australia. It was described in 2015 by entomologists Anthony Ewart, Lindsay Popple and David C. Marshall.

== Description ==
The length of the forewing is 17–23 mm.

== Distribution and habitat ==
The species is widespread across inland Australia, from the Hamersley Range in Western Australia eastwards, through the southern part of the Northern Territory, to the Simpson Desert in western Queensland. Associated habitats include open and low shrubland, often with Eremophila and Senna shrubs.

== Behaviour ==
Adult males may be heard in January and February, clinging to the stems of shrubs, emitting wavering, buzzing and chirping calls.
