= Yoyetta landsboroughi =

Scientific classification
- Kingdom: Animalia
- Phylum: Arthropoda
- Clade: Pancrustacea
- Class: Insecta
- Order: Hemiptera
- Suborder: Auchenorrhyncha
- Family: Cicadidae
- Genus: Yoyetta
- Species: Y. landsboroughi

Binomial name
- Yoyetta landsboroughi (Distant, 1882)

Synonyms
- Yoyetta toowoombae (Distant, 1915); Melampsalta toowoombae Distant, 1915; Cicadetta toowoombae (Distant, 1915); Melampsalta landsboroughi Distant, 1882; Cicadetta landsboroughi (Distant, 1882)

Species of cicada

Yoyetta landsboroughi is a species of cicada, also known as the small bassian ambertail, in the true cicada family, Cicadettinae subfamily and Cicadettini tribe. The species is endemic to Australia. It was described in 1882 by English entomologist William Lucas Distant.

== Description ==
The length of the forewing is 17–22 mm.

== Distribution and habitat ==
The species occurs in eastern and south-eastern Australia from Toowoomba in Queensland southwards along the Great Dividing Range in New South Wales, through the Australian Capital Territory, into eastern and central Victoria, with an isolated population in the Mount Lofty Ranges of south-eastern South Australia. Associated habitats include temperate open forest, grassy woodland and paddocks with scattered trees.

== Behaviour ==
Adult males may be heard from October to January, clinging to grass stems, fence posts, telegraph poles and the upper branches of eucalypts, emitting high-pitched, electric calls.
