= Tettigettula =

Scientific classification
- Kingdom: Animalia
- Phylum: Arthropoda
- Class: Insecta
- Order: Hemiptera
- Suborder: Auchenorrhyncha
- Family: Cicadidae
- Tribe: Cicadettini
- Genus: Tettigettula; Puissant, 2010

Genus of insects

Tettigettula a genus of cicada belonging to the tribe Cicadettini of the family Cicadidae.

Following a review of a number of species identified as belonging to the genus Tettigetta, based on their morphological characteristics were determined to be four distinct genera: Tettigettalna; Tettigettula; Tettigettacula; and Pseudotettigetta.

== Distribution ==
The genus is endemic to southern Spain.

== Taxonomy ==
Tettigettula contains the following species:

- Tettigettula pygmea
