= Yoyetta incepta =

Scientific classification
- Kingdom: Animalia
- Phylum: Arthropoda
- Clade: Pancrustacea
- Class: Insecta
- Order: Hemiptera
- Suborder: Auchenorrhyncha
- Family: Cicadidae
- Genus: Yoyetta
- Species: Y. incepta

Binomial name
- Yoyetta incepta (Walker, 1850)

Synonyms
- Cicadetta incepta (Walker, 1850); Cicada incepta Walker, 1850

Species of cicada

Yoyetta incepta is a species, or species complex, of cicadas, also known as false ambertails, in the true cicada family, Cicadettinae subfamily and Cicadettini tribe. The species is endemic to Australia. It was described in 1850 by English entomologist Francis Walker.

== Description ==
The length of the forewing is 16–19 mm.

== Distribution and habitat ==
The members of the species complex occur in southern inland Queensland, central western New South Wales and the Adelaide Hills of South Australia. The associated habitat is eucalypt woodland, especially near watercourses.

== Behaviour ==
Adult males may be heard from November to February, clinging to the trunks and upper branches of eucalypts, emitting high-pitched buzzing and ticking calls.
