= Yoyetta ngarabal =

Scientific classification
- Kingdom: Animalia
- Phylum: Arthropoda
- Clade: Pancrustacea
- Class: Insecta
- Order: Hemiptera
- Suborder: Auchenorrhyncha
- Family: Cicadidae
- Genus: Yoyetta
- Species: Y. ngarabal

Binomial name
- Yoyetta ngarabal Popple & Emery, 2020

Species of cicada

Yoyetta ngarabal is a species of cicada, also known as the glade firetail, in the true cicada family, Cicadettinae subfamily and Cicadettini tribe. The species is endemic to Australia. It was described in 2020 by Australian entomologists Lindsay Popple and David L. Emery.

== Etymology ==
The specific epithet ngarabal honours the Ngarabal people, the traditional Aboriginal owners of the Glen Innes area where the species is found.

== Description ==
The length of the forewing is 29–31 mm. Body length is 24–26 mm.

== Distribution and habitat ==
The species occurs in northern New South Wales, from Glen Elgin and the western slopes of the Gibraltar Range. Associated habitats include tall eucalypt forest and woodland.

== Behaviour ==
Adult males may be heard in January, clinging to the upper branches of tall eucalypts, emitting ratcheting and soft ticking calls followed by sharp “zzip” sounds.
