= Simona retracta =

Scientific classification
- Kingdom: Animalia
- Phylum: Arthropoda
- Clade: Pancrustacea
- Class: Insecta
- Order: Hemiptera
- Suborder: Auchenorrhyncha
- Family: Cicadidae
- Genus: Simona
- Species: S. retracta

Binomial name
- Simona retracta Ewart, Popple & Marshall, 2015

Species of cicada

Simona retracta is a species of cicada, also known as the Charleville Eremophila cicada, in the true cicada family, Cicadettinae subfamily and Cicadettini tribe. The species is endemic to Australia. It was described in 2015 by entomologists Anthony Ewart, Lindsay Popple and David C. Marshall.

== Description ==
The length of the forewing is 18–23 mm.

== Distribution and habitat ==
The species is only known from the vicinity of Charleville in South West Queensland. The associated habitat is open shrubland with Eremophila gilesii shrubs.

== Behaviour ==
Adult males may be heard in January and February, clinging to the stems of shrubs, emitting complex rattling, chirping and spluttering calls.
