= Yoyetta hunterorum =

Scientific classification
- Kingdom: Animalia
- Phylum: Arthropoda
- Clade: Pancrustacea
- Class: Insecta
- Order: Hemiptera
- Suborder: Auchenorrhyncha
- Family: Cicadidae
- Genus: Yoyetta
- Species: Y. hunterorum

Binomial name
- Yoyetta hunterorum (Moulds, 1988)

Synonyms
- Cicadetta hunterorum Moulds, 1988

Species of cicada

Yoyetta hunterorum is a species of cicada, also known as the Sydney treetop ticker, in the true cicada family, Cicadettinae subfamily and Cicadettini tribe. The species is endemic to Australia. It was described in 1988 by Australian entomologist Maxwell Sydney Moulds.

== Description ==
The length of the forewing is 20–30 mm.

== Distribution and habitat ==
The species occurs in south-eastern Australia, from the Gosford area of central New South Wales southwards to eastern Victoria. Associated habitats include coastal eucalypt forest and adjacent parkland.

== Behaviour ==
Adult males may be heard from October to February, clinging to the trunks and upper branches of eucalypts, emitting variable clicking calls.
