= Pericallea ewartioides =

Scientific classification
- Kingdom: Animalia
- Phylum: Arthropoda
- Clade: Pancrustacea
- Class: Insecta
- Order: Hemiptera
- Suborder: Auchenorrhyncha
- Family: Cicadidae
- Genus: Pericallea
- Species: P. ewartioides

Binomial name
- Pericallea ewartioides Popple, 2024

Species of cicada

Pericallea ewartioides is a species of cicada, also known as the green silver heath-buzzer, in the true cicada family, Cicadettinae subfamily and Cicadettini tribe. The species is endemic to Australia. It was described in 2024 by Australian entomologist Lindsay Popple.

== Description ==
The length of the forewing is 13–19 mm.

== Distribution and habitat ==
The species occurs in eastern Queensland, from the Blackdown Tableland and Woodgate southwards along the coast to the Moreton Bay islands near Brisbane, with an isolated population in the Gibraltar Range in northern New South Wales. Associated habitats include open forest, wallum heathland and montane heathland, especially with low-growing Rutaceae shrubs such as Phebalium and Boronia species.

== Behaviour ==
Adult males may be heard from September to March, clinging to the stems of heath shrubs, emitting high-pitched buzzing and chirping calls.
