= Atrapsalta emmotti =

Scientific classification
- Kingdom: Animalia
- Phylum: Arthropoda
- Clade: Pancrustacea
- Class: Insecta
- Order: Hemiptera
- Suborder: Auchenorrhyncha
- Family: Cicadidae
- Genus: Atrapsalta
- Species: A. emmotti

Binomial name
- Atrapsalta emmotti Owen & Moulds, 2016

Species of cicada

Atrapsalta emmotti is a species of cicada, also known as the Channel Country squeaker, in the true cicada family, Cicadettinae subfamily and Cicadettini tribe. It is endemic to Australia. It was described in 2016 by entomologists Christopher Owen and Maxwell Sydney Moulds.

== Etymology ==
The species epithet emmotti honours Angus Emmott of Noonbah Station, who collected many specimens, for his contributions to knowledge about the cicadas of western Queensland.

== Description ==
The length of the forewing is 16–21 mm.

== Distribution and habitat ==
The species occurs in the Channel Country of western Queensland, extending over the borders into the Northern Territory and north-eastern South Australia. The associated habitat includes the eucalypt woodlands growing along the major river systems in an arid environment.

== Behaviour ==
Adults are heard from November to February, clinging to the trunks and upper branches of the eucalypts, uttering short, repetitive, low-frequency pulsing calls.
