= Yoyetta nathani =

Scientific classification
- Kingdom: Animalia
- Phylum: Arthropoda
- Clade: Pancrustacea
- Class: Insecta
- Order: Hemiptera
- Suborder: Auchenorrhyncha
- Family: Cicadidae
- Genus: Yoyetta
- Species: Y. nathani

Binomial name
- Yoyetta nathani Emery, 2025

Species of cicada

Yoyetta nathani is a species of cicada in the true cicada family, Cicadettinae subfamily and Cicadettini tribe. The species is endemic to Australia. It was described in 2025 by Australian entomologist David L. Emery.

== Etymology ==
The specific epithet nathani honours ecologist Nathan Emery.

== Distribution and habitat ==
The species occurs from Armidale northwards to Bingara and Inverell, in the New England region of New South Wales. The holotype specimen was collected in the Goonoowigal State Conservation Area at Inverell.
