= Yoyetta robusta =

Scientific classification
- Kingdom: Animalia
- Phylum: Arthropoda
- Clade: Pancrustacea
- Class: Insecta
- Order: Hemiptera
- Suborder: Auchenorrhyncha
- Family: Cicadidae
- Genus: Yoyetta
- Species: Y. robusta

Binomial name
- Yoyetta robusta Popple & Emery, 2022

Species of cicada

Yoyetta robusta is a species of cicada, also known as the robust ambertail, in the true cicada family, Cicadettinae subfamily and Cicadettini tribe. The species is endemic to Australia. It was described in 2022 by Australian entomologists Lindsay Popple and David L. Emery.

== Etymology ==
The specific epithet robusta (Latin: “robust”) refers to the robust appearance of the cicadas compared to their congeners.

== Description ==
The length of the forewing is 26–32 mm.

== Distribution and habitat ==
The species occurs from Stanthorpe in south-eastern Queensland southwards to Glen Innes in north-eastern New South Wales. The associated habitat is open forest.

== Behaviour ==
Adult males may be heard from December to January, clinging to the stems and branches of trees and shrubs, emitting strident double-clicking calls.
