= Yoyetta psammitica =

Scientific classification
- Kingdom: Animalia
- Phylum: Arthropoda
- Clade: Pancrustacea
- Class: Insecta
- Order: Hemiptera
- Suborder: Auchenorrhyncha
- Family: Cicadidae
- Genus: Yoyetta
- Species: Y. psammitica

Binomial name
- Yoyetta psammitica Emery, Emery & Popple, 2025

Species of cicada

Yoyetta psammitica is a species of cicada, also known as the sandstone ambertail, in the true cicada family, Cicadettinae subfamily and Cicadettini tribe. The species is endemic to Australia. It was described in 2025 by Australian entomologists David L. Emery, Nathan J. Emery and Lindsay Popple.

== Etymology ==
The specific epithet psammitica is derived from Greek psammítēs (“sandstone”), referring to the species’ habitat.

== Description ==
The length of the forewing is 25–33 mm.

== Distribution and habitat ==
The species occurs in the Carnarvon Range of Central Queensland as well as from the Warrumbungles southwards to Capertee and Bathurst in New South Wales. Associated habitats are the open eucalypt woodlands on sandstone soils of the western slopes of the Great Dividing Range.

== Behaviour ==
Adult males may be heard, while in flight or perched on trees, emitting ticking and buzzing calls.
