= Ewartia brevis =

Scientific classification
- Kingdom: Animalia
- Phylum: Arthropoda
- Clade: Pancrustacea
- Class: Insecta
- Order: Hemiptera
- Suborder: Auchenorrhyncha
- Family: Cicadidae
- Genus: Ewartia
- Species: E. brevis

Binomial name
- Ewartia brevis (Ashton, 1912)

Synonyms
- Melampsalta brevis Ashton, 1912; Cicadetta brevis (Ashton, 1912)

Species of cicada

Ewartia brevis is a species of cicada, also known as the Cooktown wattle cicada or varnished cicada, in the true cicada family, Cicadettinae subfamily and Cicadettini tribe. It is endemic to Australia. It was described in 1912 by Australian entomologist Julian Howard Ashton.

== Description ==
The length of the forewing is 21–23 mm.

== Distribution and habitat ==
The species is known only from the Cooktown district of Far North Queensland. Its habitat is heathland, tropical bushland, and the edges of vine forests where wattles are present.

== Behaviour ==
Adults are heard from December to February, clinging to the stems and trunks of wattles, uttering buzzing calls followed by a series of chirps.
