= Ewartia thamna =

Scientific classification
- Kingdom: Animalia
- Phylum: Arthropoda
- Clade: Pancrustacea
- Class: Insecta
- Order: Hemiptera
- Suborder: Auchenorrhyncha
- Family: Cicadidae
- Genus: Ewartia
- Species: E. thamna

Binomial name
- Ewartia thamna Popple, 2017

Species of cicada

Ewartia thamna is a species of cicada, also known as the shrub wattle cicada, in the true cicada family, Cicadettinae subfamily and Cicadettini tribe. It is endemic to Australia. It was described in 2017 by Australian entomologist Lindsay Popple.

== Description ==
The length of the forewing is 16–20 mm.

== Distribution and habitat ==
The species is known only from the Northern Territory, from a site east of Mataranka, in the Arnhem Plateau bioregion. Its associated habitat includes low shrubby wattle trees and grass on weathered sandstone sediments.

== Behaviour ==
Adults have been heard in early February, clinging to the branches of wattles, uttering repetitive, lilting calls.
