= Ewartia etesia =

Scientific classification
- Kingdom: Animalia
- Phylum: Arthropoda
- Clade: Pancrustacea
- Class: Insecta
- Order: Hemiptera
- Suborder: Auchenorrhyncha
- Family: Cicadidae
- Genus: Ewartia
- Species: E. etesia

Binomial name
- Ewartia etesia Popple, 2017

Species of cicada

Ewartia etesia is a species of cicada, also known as the northern wattle cicada, in the true cicada family, Cicadettinae subfamily and Cicadettini tribe. It is endemic to Australia. It was described in 2017 by Australian entomologist Lindsay Popple.

== Description ==
The length of the forewing is 18–24 mm.

== Distribution and habitat ==
The species’ known distribution is the Top End of the Northern Territory, extending into the eastern edge of the Kimberley region of Western Australia. Its associated habitat is tropical woodlands with wattle trees.

== Behaviour ==
Adults are heard from October to February, clinging to the branches of wattles, uttering repetitive, lilting calls.
