= Yoyetta corbinorum =

Scientific classification
- Kingdom: Animalia
- Phylum: Arthropoda
- Clade: Pancrustacea
- Class: Insecta
- Order: Hemiptera
- Suborder: Auchenorrhyncha
- Family: Cicadidae
- Genus: Yoyetta
- Species: Y. corbinorum

Binomial name
- Yoyetta corbinorum Emery, 2025

Species of cicada

Yoyetta corbinorum is a species of cicada in the true cicada family, Cicadettinae subfamily and Cicadettini tribe. The species is endemic to Australia. It was described in 2025 by Australian entomologist David L. Emery.

== Etymology ==
The specific epithet corbinorum honours entomological collectors Samantha and Thomas Corbin.

== Distribution and habitat ==
The species inhabits mountain ash forests in the Yarra Ranges of Victoria. The holotype specimen was collected at Toolangi.
