= Simona sancta =

Scientific classification
- Kingdom: Animalia
- Phylum: Arthropoda
- Clade: Pancrustacea
- Class: Insecta
- Order: Hemiptera
- Suborder: Auchenorrhyncha
- Family: Cicadidae
- Genus: Simona
- Species: S. sancta

Binomial name
- Simona sancta (Distant, 1913)

Synonyms
- Melampsalta sancta Distant, 1913; Melampsalta subglusa Ashton, 1914; Cicadetta sancta (Distant, 1913)

Species of cicada

Simona sancta is a species of cicada, also known as the western eremophila cicada, in the true cicada family, Cicadettinae subfamily and Cicadettini tribe. The species is endemic to Australia. It was described in 1913 by English entomologist William Lucas Distant.

== Description ==
The length of the forewing is 18–24 mm.

== Distribution and habitat ==
The species is only known from the vicinity of Cue in the Mid West region of Western Australia. The associated habitat is open, low shrubland.

== Behaviour ==
Adult males may be heard in February, clinging to the stems of shrubs, emitting chirping and buzzing calls terminating in a sharp click.
