= Ewartia oldfieldi =

Scientific classification
- Kingdom: Animalia
- Phylum: Arthropoda
- Clade: Pancrustacea
- Class: Insecta
- Order: Hemiptera
- Suborder: Auchenorrhyncha
- Family: Cicadidae
- Genus: Ewartia
- Species: E. oldfieldi

Binomial name
- Ewartia oldfieldi (Distant, 1883)

Synonyms
- Melampsalta oldfieldi Distant, 1883; Cicadetta oldfieldi (Distant, 1883)

Species of cicada

Ewartia oldfieldi is a species of cicada, also known as the broad-striped wattle cicada, in the true cicada family, Cicadettinae subfamily and Cicadettini tribe. It is endemic to Australia. It was described in 1883 by English entomologist William Lucas Distant.

== Description ==
The length of the forewing is 20–26 mm.

== Distribution and habitat ==
The species occurs in south-eastern Queensland from the Tropic of Capricorn southwards to the New South Wales border. Its associated habitat is low shrubland and open forest with wattles.

== Behaviour ==
Adults are heard from September to April, clinging to the outer stems and upper branches of wattles, uttering repetitive, lilting calls.
