= Atrapsalta audax =

Scientific classification
- Kingdom: Animalia
- Phylum: Arthropoda
- Clade: Pancrustacea
- Class: Insecta
- Order: Hemiptera
- Suborder: Auchenorrhyncha
- Family: Cicadidae
- Genus: Atrapsalta
- Species: A. audax

Binomial name
- Atrapsalta audax Popple & Stolarski, 2024

Species of cicada

Atrapsalta audax, also known as the Adelaide black squeaker, is a species of cicada in the Cicadidae family, Cicadettinae subfamily and Cicadettini tribe. It is endemic to Australia. It was described in 2024 by Australian entomologists Lindsay Popple and Alex Stolarski.

== Description ==
The length of the forewing is 15–19 mm.

== Distribution and habitat ==
The species occurs in the Flinders Lofty Block and Kanmantoo bioregions of south-eastern South Australia, along the western side of the Adelaide Hills to Victor Harbour, as well as in Kangaroo Island. The holotype was collected at the Mount Bold Reservoir.

== Behaviour ==
Adults are heard from October to February, clinging to trees, shrubs, grass and dead timber, uttering calls characterised by repeated buzzing phrases with an upward inflection.
