= Yoyetta spectabilis =

Scientific classification
- Kingdom: Animalia
- Phylum: Arthropoda
- Clade: Pancrustacea
- Class: Insecta
- Order: Hemiptera
- Suborder: Auchenorrhyncha
- Family: Cicadidae
- Genus: Yoyetta
- Species: Y. serrata

Binomial name
- Yoyetta serrata Emery, Emery & Popple, 2019

Species of cicada

Yoyetta spectabilis is a species of cicada, also known as the wavering firetail, in the true cicada family, Cicadettinae subfamily and Cicadettini tribe. The species is endemic to Australia. It was described in 2019 by Australian entomologists David L. Emery, Nathan J. Emery and Lindsay Popple.

== Etymology ==
The specific epithet spectabilis refers to the impressive markings and colouration, ranging from orange-red to enamel black, of the species.

== Description ==
The length of the forewing is 23–28 mm. Body length is 20–26 mm.

== Distribution and habitat ==
The species occurs in New South Wales from Barrington Tops, and from Blackheath in the Blue Mountains southwards to Clyde Mountain, as well as from Moondarra in Victoria. Associated habitats include both open and closed heathland, and eucalypt forest with a heathy understorey.

== Behaviour ==
Adult males may be heard from November to January, clinging to the stems and branches of eucalypts and heath vegetation, emitting repetitive wavering calls.
