= Diemeniana hirsuta =

Scientific classification
- Kingdom: Animalia
- Phylum: Arthropoda
- Clade: Pancrustacea
- Class: Insecta
- Order: Hemiptera
- Suborder: Auchenorrhyncha
- Family: Cicadidae
- Genus: Diemeniana
- Species: D. hirsuta

Binomial name
- Diemeniana hirsuta (Goding & Froggatt, 1904)

Synonyms
- Tibicen hirsutus Goding & Froggatt, 1904; Diemeniana turneri Distant, 1914

Species of cicada

Diemeniana hirsuta is a species of cicada, also known as the black twanger, in the true cicada family, Cicadettinae subfamily and Cicadettini tribe. It is endemic to Australia. It was described in 1904 by entomologists Frederic Webster Goding and Walter Wilson Froggatt.

== Description ==
The length of the forewing is 22–24 mm.

== Distribution and habitat ==
The species occurs in central and southern Tasmania, including Mount Wellington. The associated habitat is open shrubland.

== Behaviour ==
Adults emerge from December to March, clinging to the foliage and stems of low shrubs, uttering calls characterised by a long metallic buzz with a sharp terminal click.
