= Yoyetta fluviatilis =

Scientific classification
- Kingdom: Animalia
- Phylum: Arthropoda
- Clade: Pancrustacea
- Class: Insecta
- Order: Hemiptera
- Suborder: Auchenorrhyncha
- Family: Cicadidae
- Genus: Yoyetta
- Species: Y. fluviatilis

Binomial name
- Yoyetta fluviatilis Emery, Emery & Popple, 2015

Species of cicada

Yoyetta fluviatilis is a species of cicada, also known as the river ambertail, in the true cicada family, Cicadettinae subfamily and Cicadettini tribe. The species is endemic to Australia. It was described in 2015 by Australian entomologists Nathan J. Emery, David L. Emery and Lindsay Popple.

== Description ==
The length of the forewing is 15–21 mm.

== Distribution and habitat ==
The species occurs along the river systems of inland southern Queensland, New South Wales, northern Victoria and eastern South Australia, as well as around Alice Springs in the Northern Territory. The associated habitat is riverine eucalypt woodland.

== Behaviour ==
Adult males may be heard from September to February, clinging to the main trunks and branches of eucalypts, emitting monotonously repetitive, high-pitched buzzing calls.
