= Punia limpida =

Scientific classification
- Kingdom: Animalia
- Phylum: Arthropoda
- Clade: Pancrustacea
- Class: Insecta
- Order: Hemiptera
- Suborder: Auchenorrhyncha
- Family: Cicadidae
- Genus: Punia
- Species: P. limpida

Binomial name
- Punia limpida Moulds, 2020

Species of cicada

Punia limpida is a species of cicada, also known as the green grass pygmy, in the true cicada family, Cicadettinae subfamily and Cicadettini tribe. The species is endemic to Australia. It was described in 2020 by Australian entomologist Maxwell Sydney Moulds.

== Etymology ==
The specific epithet limpida is derived from limpidus (Latin: 'transparent' or 'clear') with reference to the translucent abdominal tergites of the male cicadas.

== Description ==
The length of the forewing is 12–13 mm.

== Distribution and habitat ==
The species occurs across much of inland northern Australia, from the Kimberley region of Western Australia, eastwards through the central Northern Territory, into north-west Queensland as far as Chillagoe and Einasleigh. Associated habitats are open grassland and grassy woodland.

== Behaviour ==
Adult males may be heard from December to March.
