= Yoyetta bushi =

Scientific classification
- Kingdom: Animalia
- Phylum: Arthropoda
- Clade: Pancrustacea
- Class: Insecta
- Order: Hemiptera
- Suborder: Auchenorrhyncha
- Family: Cicadidae
- Genus: Yoyetta
- Species: Y. bushi

Binomial name
- Yoyetta bushi Emery, 2025

Species of cicada

Yoyetta bushi is a species of cicada in the true cicada family, Cicadettinae subfamily and Cicadettini tribe. The species is endemic to Australia. It was described in 2025 by Australian entomologist David L. Emery.

== Etymology ==
The specific epithet bushi honours entomological collector Tony Bush.

== Distribution and habitat ==
The species occurs in north-eastern New South Wales in Girard State Forest and across Nymboi-Binderay National Park and adjoining state forests in the Great Dividing Range. The holotype specimen was collected in the Kangaroo River State Forest. Associated habitats include Sydney blue gum and blackbutt forests at elevations above 500 m.
