= Pericallea =

Scientific classification
- Kingdom: Animalia
- Phylum: Arthropoda
- Clade: Pancrustacea
- Class: Insecta
- Order: Hemiptera
- Suborder: Auchenorrhyncha
- Family: Cicadidae
- Subfamily: Cicadettinae
- Tribe: Cicadettini
- Genus: Pericallea; Moulds, Marshall & Hutchinson, 2022

Genus of cicadas

Pericallea is a genus of cicadas, also known as silver heath-buzzers, in the family Cicadidae, subfamily Cicadettinae and tribe Cicadettini. It is endemic to Australia. It was described in 2022 by Australian entomologists Maxwell Sydney Moulds, David C. Marshall and Paul M. Hutchinson.

== Species ==
As of 2025 there two described species in the genus:

- Pericallea ewartioides Popple, 2024 (Green Silver Heath-buzzer)
- Pericallea katherina Moulds, Marshall & Hutchinson, 2022 (Gold Silver Heath-buzzer)
