= Atrapsalta vinea =

Scientific classification
- Kingdom: Animalia
- Phylum: Arthropoda
- Clade: Pancrustacea
- Class: Insecta
- Order: Hemiptera
- Suborder: Auchenorrhyncha
- Family: Cicadidae
- Genus: Atrapsalta
- Species: A. vinea

Binomial name
- Atrapsalta vinea Owen & Moulds, 2016

Species of cicada

Atrapsalta vinea is a species of cicada, also known as the Clare Valley squeaker, in the true cicada family, Cicadettinae subfamily and Cicadettini tribe. It is endemic to Australia. It was described in 2016 by entomologists Christopher Owen and Maxwell Sydney Moulds.

== Etymology ==
The species epithet vinea comes from Latin vinum (‘wine’) with reference to the large number of vineyards in the area where the species occurs.

== Description ==
The length of the forewing is 19–24 mm.

== Distribution and habitat ==
The species is found in South Australia from the Flinders Ranges and eastern Eyre Peninsula southwards to the Clare Valley. The associated habitat consists of eucalypt woodlands, including mallee.

== Behaviour ==
Adults are heard in December and January, clinging to the main stems and upper branches of the eucalypts, uttering buzzing calls followed by a sequence of strident phrases.
