= Punia queenslandica =

Scientific classification
- Kingdom: Animalia
- Phylum: Arthropoda
- Clade: Pancrustacea
- Class: Insecta
- Order: Hemiptera
- Suborder: Auchenorrhyncha
- Family: Cicadidae
- Genus: Punia
- Species: P. queenslandica

Binomial name
- Punia queenslandica Moulds, 2020

Species of cicada

Punia queenslandica is a species of cicada, also known as the eastern grass pygmy, in the true cicada family, Cicadettinae subfamily and Cicadettini tribe. The species is endemic to Australia. It was described in 2020 by Australian entomologist Maxwell Sydney Moulds.

== Etymology ==
The specific epithet queenslandica refers to the state of Queensland, which encompasses the known range of the species.

== Description ==
The length of the forewing is 9–11 mm.

== Distribution and habitat ==
The species occurs in coastal and subcoastal areas of north-eastern Queensland, from the Iron Range southwards to Mount Storth, some 35 km south of Townsville. Associated habitats are open grassland and grassy woodland.

== Behaviour ==
Adult males may be heard from November to March, clinging to grass stems, emitting low-pitched, stuttering, chirping calls.
