= Atrapsalta furcilla =

Scientific classification
- Kingdom: Animalia
- Phylum: Arthropoda
- Clade: Pancrustacea
- Class: Insecta
- Order: Hemiptera
- Suborder: Auchenorrhyncha
- Family: Cicadidae
- Genus: Atrapsalta
- Species: A. furcilla

Binomial name
- Atrapsalta furcilla Owen & Moulds, 2016

Species of cicada

Atrapsalta furcilla is a species of cicada, also known as the southern mountain squeaker, in the true cicada family, Cicadettinae subfamily and Cicadettini tribe. It is endemic to Australia. It was described in 2016 by entomologists Christopher Owen and Maxwell Sydney Moulds.

== Etymology ==
The species epithet furcilla comes from Greek furcilla (‘yellow’) with reference to the yellow-coloured upper pygofer lobes of the males.

== Description ==
The length of the forewing is 14–18 mm.

== Distribution and habitat ==
The species occurs in the cooler, highland regions of south-eastern Australia from Clandulla in New South Wales, through the Australian Capital Territory and much of eastern and southern Victoria, to extreme south-eastern South Australia, as well as Tasmania. So far, one individual has been sighted in the Mount Lofty Ranges. The associated habitat includes cool temperate eucalypt forests.

== Behaviour ==
Adults are heard from November to February, clinging to the main trunks and upper branches of the eucalypts, uttering two-part calls, the second a syncopated ticking with short buzz notes.
