= Yoyetta verrens =

Scientific classification
- Kingdom: Animalia
- Phylum: Arthropoda
- Clade: Pancrustacea
- Class: Insecta
- Order: Hemiptera
- Suborder: Auchenorrhyncha
- Family: Cicadidae
- Genus: Yoyetta
- Species: Y. verrens

Binomial name
- Yoyetta verrens Emery, Emery & Popple, 2019

Species of cicada

Yoyetta verrens is a species of cicada, also known as the sweeping firetail, in the true cicada family, Cicadettinae subfamily and Cicadettini tribe. The species is endemic to Australia. It was described in 2019 by Australian entomologists David L. Emery, Nathan J. Emery and Lindsay Popple.

== Etymology ==
The specific epithet verrens (Latin: “sweeping”) refers to the sweeping nature of the calling song in flight.

== Description ==
The length of the forewing is 28–32 mm. Body length is 22–26 mm.

== Distribution and habitat ==
The species occurs from Springbrook National Park in south-east Queensland south-westwards to Torrington State Conservation Area in northern New South Wales, with an isolated population near Kinglake in Victoria. Associated habitats include montane eucalypt forest and woodland.

== Behaviour ==
Adult males may be heard from December to January, clinging to the upper branches of tall eucalypts, including stringybarks, and emitting high-frequency, upwardly inflected "sssseeep, sssseeep, sssseeep" calls when in flight.
