= Yoyetta douglasi =

Scientific classification
- Kingdom: Animalia
- Phylum: Arthropoda
- Clade: Pancrustacea
- Class: Insecta
- Order: Hemiptera
- Suborder: Auchenorrhyncha
- Family: Cicadidae
- Genus: Yoyetta
- Species: Y. douglasi

Binomial name
- Yoyetta douglasi Popple & Emery, 2020

Species of cicada

Yoyetta douglasi is a species of cicada, also known as the Grampians firetail, in the true cicada family, Cicadettinae subfamily and Cicadettini tribe. The species is endemic to Australia. It was described in 2020 by Australian entomologists Lindsay Popple and David L. Emery.

== Etymology ==
The specific epithet douglasi honours Fabian Douglas for his contributions to the knowledge of cicadas and other insects and their conservation in western Victoria.

== Description ==
The length of the forewing is 28–36 mm. Body length is 24–33 mm.

== Distribution and habitat ==
The species is only known from the Grampians Range of western Victoria. Associated habitats are temperate eucalypt forest and woodland.

== Behaviour ==
Adult males may be heard from December to February, clinging to the trunks and upper branches of eucalypts, emitting drawn-out: "neeeye-di-dip" calls.
