= Atrapsalta collina =

Scientific classification
- Kingdom: Animalia
- Phylum: Arthropoda
- Clade: Pancrustacea
- Class: Insecta
- Order: Hemiptera
- Suborder: Auchenorrhyncha
- Family: Cicadidae
- Genus: Atrapsalta
- Species: A. collina

Binomial name
- Atrapsalta collina (Ewart, 1989)

Synonyms
- Pauropsalta collina Ewart, 1989

Species of cicada

Atrapsalta collina, also known as the sandstone squeaker, is a species of cicada in the true cicada family, Cicadettinae subfamily and Cicadettini tribe. It is endemic to Australia. It was described in 1989 by Australian entomologist Anthony Ewart.

== Etymology ==
The specific epithet collina comes from Latin collina ('hill' or 'high ground').

== Description ==
The length of the forewing is 16–22 mm.

== Distribution and habitat ==
The species occurs from Chinchilla in the Western Downs Region of southern Queensland, southwards along the Great Dividing Range in New South Wales to the Victorian border, as well as in the Grampians of western Victoria. The holotype was collected in Girraween National Park. The associated habitat includes open forest, eucalypt woodland and open heathland.

== Behaviour ==
Adults are heard from September to March, clinging to the foliage and branches of eucalypts and heath shrubs, uttering rapid, strongly modulated, chirping calls.
