= Yoyetta kershawi =

Scientific classification
- Kingdom: Animalia
- Phylum: Arthropoda
- Clade: Pancrustacea
- Class: Insecta
- Order: Hemiptera
- Suborder: Auchenorrhyncha
- Family: Cicadidae
- Genus: Yoyetta
- Species: Y. kershawi

Binomial name
- Yoyetta kershawi (Goding & Froggatt, 1904)

Synonyms
- Melampsalta kershawi Goding & Froggatt, 1904; Cicadetta kershawi (Goding & Froggatt, 1904)

Species of cicada

Yoyetta kershawi is a species of cicada, also known as the Victorian firetail, in the true cicada family, Cicadettinae subfamily and Cicadettini tribe. The species is endemic to Australia. It was described in 1904 by entomologists Frederic Webster Goding and Walter Wilson Froggatt.

== Description ==
The length of the forewing is 28–35 mm.

== Distribution and habitat ==
The species occurs in south-eastern Australia from Batemans Bay in southern New South Wales southwards across much of eastern Victoria, with an isolated population in the Great Otway National Park. The associated habitat is cool temperate eucalypt forest.

== Behaviour ==
Adults appear from late November to January.
