= Atrapsalta fuscata =

Scientific classification
- Kingdom: Animalia
- Phylum: Arthropoda
- Clade: Pancrustacea
- Class: Insecta
- Order: Hemiptera
- Suborder: Auchenorrhyncha
- Family: Cicadidae
- Genus: Atrapsalta
- Species: A. fuscata

Binomial name
- Atrapsalta fuscata (Ewart), 1989

Synonyms
- Pauropsalta fuscata Ewart, 1989

Species of cicada

Atrapsalta fuscata is a species or species complex of cicadas, also known as small bark squeakers, in the true cicada family, Cicadettinae subfamily and Cicadettini tribe. It is endemic to Australia. It was described in 1989 by Australian entomologist Anthony Ewart.

== Etymology ==
The specific epithet fuscata is derived from Latin fuscus ('dark' or 'dusky').

== Description ==
The length of the forewing is 15–18 mm.

== Distribution and habitat ==
The species complex occurs from central to south-eastern Queensland, southwards along the coast and the Great Dividing Range through north-eastern New South Wales to the northern edge of Greater Sydney. The holotype was collected at Doolandella, some 20 km west of Brisbane. The associated habitat includes open forest and heathland.

== Behaviour ==
Adults are heard from September to April, clinging low on tree trunks, burnt stumps, in shrub foliage and sometimes on grass, uttering a variety of calls.
