= Yoyetta subalpina =

Scientific classification
- Kingdom: Animalia
- Phylum: Arthropoda
- Clade: Pancrustacea
- Class: Insecta
- Order: Hemiptera
- Suborder: Auchenorrhyncha
- Family: Cicadidae
- Genus: Yoyetta
- Species: Y. subalpina

Binomial name
- Yoyetta subalpina Emery, Emery & Popple, 2019

Species of cicada

Yoyetta subalpina is a species of cicada, also known as the subalpine firetail, in the true cicada family, Cicadettinae subfamily and Cicadettini tribe. The species is endemic to Australia. It was described in 2019 by Australian entomologists David L. Emery, Nathan J. Emery and Lindsay Popple.

== Etymology ==
The specific epithet subalpina refers to the subalpine habitats where the species is typically found.

== Description ==
The length of the forewing is 26–31 mm. Body length is 25–27 mm.

== Distribution and habitat ==
The species occurs in New South Wales from Kanangra-Boyd National Park southwards along the tablelands, through higher elevations in the Australian Capital Territory, to eastern Victoria. The associated habitat is subalpine eucalypt forest and woodland.

== Behaviour ==
Adult males may be heard from December to January, clinging to the trunks and branches of tall eucalypts, emitting distinctive “nee-dip, nee-dip” calls interspersed with quiet ticking.
