= Ewartia adusta =

Scientific classification
- Kingdom: Animalia
- Phylum: Arthropoda
- Clade: Pancrustacea
- Class: Insecta
- Order: Hemiptera
- Suborder: Auchenorrhyncha
- Family: Cicadidae
- Genus: Ewartia
- Species: E. adusta

Binomial name
- Ewartia adusta Moulds & Marshall, 2022

Species of cicada

Ewartia adusta is a species of cicada, also known as the sporty wattle cicada, in the true cicada family, Cicadettinae subfamily and Cicadettini tribe. It is endemic to Australia. It was described in 2022 by Australian entomologists Maxwell Sydney Moulds and David C. Marshall.

== Description ==
The length of the forewing is 17–24 mm.

== Distribution and habitat ==
The species occurs over a broad swathe of central Western Australia eastwards across Central Australia into Queensland. Its associated habitat is shrubland where wattles are present, especially Acacia aneura (Mulga).

== Behaviour ==
Adults are heard from October to March, clinging to the stems of wattles, uttering calls characterised by rapid chirps followed by a short buzz.
