= Yoyetta denisoni =

Scientific classification
- Kingdom: Animalia
- Phylum: Arthropoda
- Clade: Pancrustacea
- Class: Insecta
- Order: Hemiptera
- Suborder: Auchenorrhyncha
- Family: Cicadidae
- Genus: Yoyetta
- Species: Y. denisoni

Binomial name
- Yoyetta denisoni (Distant, 1893)

Synonyms
- Melampsalta denisoni Distant, 1893; Cicadetta denisoni (Distant, 1893)

Species of cicada

Yoyetta denisoni is a species of cicada, also known as the black firetail, in the true cicada family, Cicadettinae subfamily and Cicadettini tribe. The species is endemic to Australia. It was described in 1893 by English entomologist William Lucas Distant.

== Description ==
The length of the forewing is 28–35 mm.

== Distribution and habitat ==
The species occurs in eastern New South Wales from the Gibraltar Range southwards along the ranges and coast, through the Australian Capital Territory to the Southern Highlands and South Coast. There is also a record from Kevington, Victoria. Associated habitats include temperate eucalypt forest and subalpine woodland.

== Behaviour ==
Adult males may be heard from November to January, emitting rapid “zot-zot-zot” calls in flight.
