= Yoyetta cumberlandi =

Scientific classification
- Kingdom: Animalia
- Phylum: Arthropoda
- Clade: Pancrustacea
- Class: Insecta
- Order: Hemiptera
- Suborder: Auchenorrhyncha
- Family: Cicadidae
- Genus: Yoyetta
- Species: Y. cumberlandi

Binomial name
- Yoyetta cumberlandi Emery, Emery & Popple, 2015

Species of cicada

Yoyetta cumberlandi is a species of cicada, also known as the Cumberland ambertail, in the true cicada family, Cicadettinae subfamily and Cicadettini tribe. The species is endemic to Australia. It was described in 2015 by Australian entomologists Nathan J. Emery, David L. Emery and Lindsay Popple.

== Description ==
The length of the forewing is 21–25 mm.

== Distribution and habitat ==
The species occurs in the western suburbs of Sydney, Cumberland County, New South Wales. The associated habitat is open forest, especially near water.

== Behaviour ==
Adult males may be heard from October to December, clinging to the main trunks and upper branches of eucalypts such as broad-leaved red ironbarks, emitting chirping and rattling calls.
