= Atrapsalta dolens =

Scientific classification
- Kingdom: Animalia
- Phylum: Arthropoda
- Clade: Pancrustacea
- Class: Insecta
- Order: Hemiptera
- Suborder: Auchenorrhyncha
- Family: Cicadidae
- Genus: Atrapsalta
- Species: A. dolens

Binomial name
- Atrapsalta dolens (Walker, 1850)

Synonyms
- Pauropsalta dolens Walker, 1850

Species of cicada

Atrapsalta dolens is a species of cicada, also known as the south-western bark squeaker, in the true cicada family, Cicadettinae subfamily and Cicadettini tribe. It is endemic to Australia. It was described in 1850 by English entomologist Francis Walker.

== Description ==
The length of the forewing is 13–16 mm.

== Distribution and habitat ==
The species occurs in south-west Western Australia, as well as on the Eyre Peninsula and in south-eastern South Australia. The associated habitat includes open eucalypt woodland and heathland.

== Behaviour ==
Adults are heard from September to February, the males clinging to the foliage of heath shrubs, uttering slow, repetitive "dit-dyerr" calls.
