= Yoyetta fumea =

Scientific classification
- Kingdom: Animalia
- Phylum: Arthropoda
- Clade: Pancrustacea
- Class: Insecta
- Order: Hemiptera
- Suborder: Auchenorrhyncha
- Family: Cicadidae
- Genus: Yoyetta
- Species: Y. fumea

Binomial name
- Yoyetta fumea Emery, Emery & Popple, 2025

Species of cicada

Yoyetta fumea is a species of cicada, also known as the smoky-winged ambertail, in the true cicada family, Cicadettinae subfamily and Cicadettini tribe. The species is endemic to Australia. It was described in 2025 by Australian entomologists David L. Emery, Nathan J. Emery and Lindsay Popple.

== Etymology ==
The specific epithet fumea (Latin: “smoky”) is an anatomical reference to the smoky colouration of the apical cells of the forewing.

== Description ==
The length of the forewing is 23–32 mm.

== Distribution and habitat ==
The species occurs in the Southern Tablelands of New South Wales between Tarago and Marulan. The species is found mainly in association with black she-oak trees.

== Behaviour ==
Adult males may be heard between November and January, emitting buzzing and ticking calls.
