= Yoyetta ignita =

Scientific classification
- Kingdom: Animalia
- Phylum: Arthropoda
- Clade: Pancrustacea
- Class: Insecta
- Order: Hemiptera
- Suborder: Auchenorrhyncha
- Family: Cicadidae
- Genus: Yoyetta
- Species: Y. ignita

Binomial name
- Yoyetta ignita Popple & Emery, 2022

Species of cicada

Yoyetta ignita is a species of cicada, also known as the fiery ambertail, in the true cicada family, Cicadettinae subfamily and Cicadettini tribe. The species is endemic to Australia. It was described in 2022 by Australian entomologists Lindsay Popple and David L. Emery.

== Etymology ==
The specific epithet ignita (Latin: “ignited”) refers to the strong orange colouration on the cicadas’ abdomens.

== Description ==
The length of the forewing is 23–34 mm.

== Distribution and habitat ==
The species occurs in south-eastern Queensland from Goomburra and Tamborine Mountain southwards along the Great Dividing Range through New South Wales to Mount Ainslie in the Australian Capital Territory. Associated habitats include tall open forest on mountain slopes, groves of montane mallee, heathland and she-oak forest.

== Behaviour ==
Adult males may be heard from October to February, clinging to the upper branches of trees, emitting rapid ticking calls interspersed with low-pitched "zeep-zeep" phrases.
