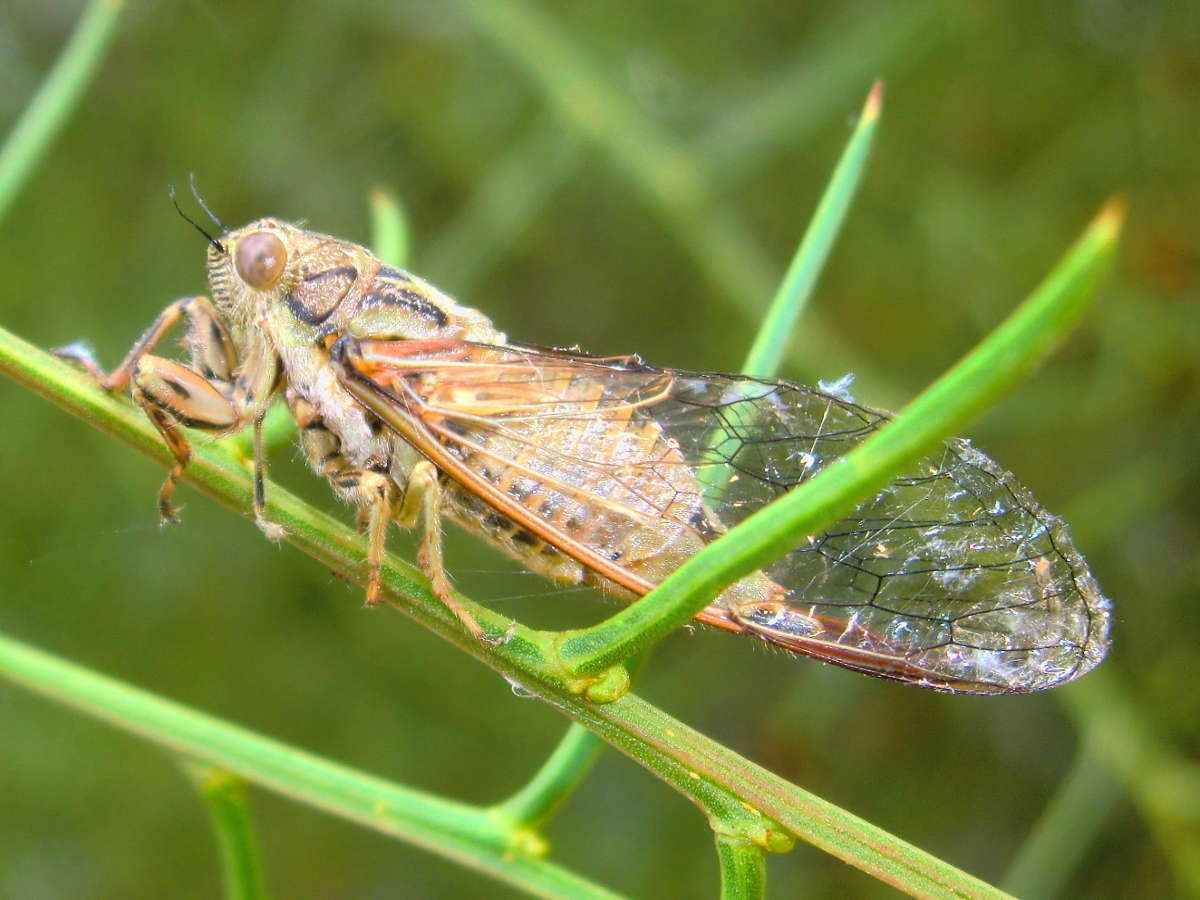
- Yoyetta celis, Victoria, Australia

Scientific classification
- Kingdom: Animalia
- Phylum: Arthropoda
- Clade: Pancrustacea
- Class: Insecta
- Order: Hemiptera
- Suborder: Auchenorrhyncha
- Family: Cicadidae
- Subfamily: Cicadettinae
- Tribe: Cicadettini
- Genus: Yoyetta
- Species: Y. celis

Binomial name
- Yoyetta celis (Moulds, 1988)

= Yoyetta celis =

Species of true bug

Yoyetta celis, the silver princess, is a species of cicada in the family Cicadidae found in southeastern Australia.
