= Diemeniana euronotiana =

Scientific classification
- Kingdom: Animalia
- Phylum: Arthropoda
- Clade: Pancrustacea
- Class: Insecta
- Order: Hemiptera
- Suborder: Auchenorrhyncha
- Family: Cicadidae
- Genus: Diemeniana
- Species: D. euronotiana

Binomial name
- Diemeniana euronotiana (Kirkaldy, 1909)

Synonyms
- Cicada aurata Walker, 1850; Abricta euronotiana Kirkaldy, 1909; Diemeniana richesi Distant, 1913

Species of cicada

Diemeniana euronotiana is a species of cicada, also known as the golden twanger, in the true cicada family, Cicadettinae subfamily and Cicadettini tribe. It is endemic to Australia. It was described in 1909 by English entomologist George Willis Kirkaldy.

== Description ==
The length of the forewing is 13–17 mm.

== Distribution and habitat ==
The species occurs in south-eastern Australia, mainly in cool temperate areas above an elevation of 1,000 m along the Great Dividing Range, from Basket Swamp in northern New South Wales southwards to Victoria, as well as in Tasmania. The associated habitat is heathland, shrubland, swampy areas and riparian communities.

== Behaviour ==
Adults emerge from October to February, uttering calls characterised by a series of 'twangs' followed by a low-pitched 'raspberry' sound.
