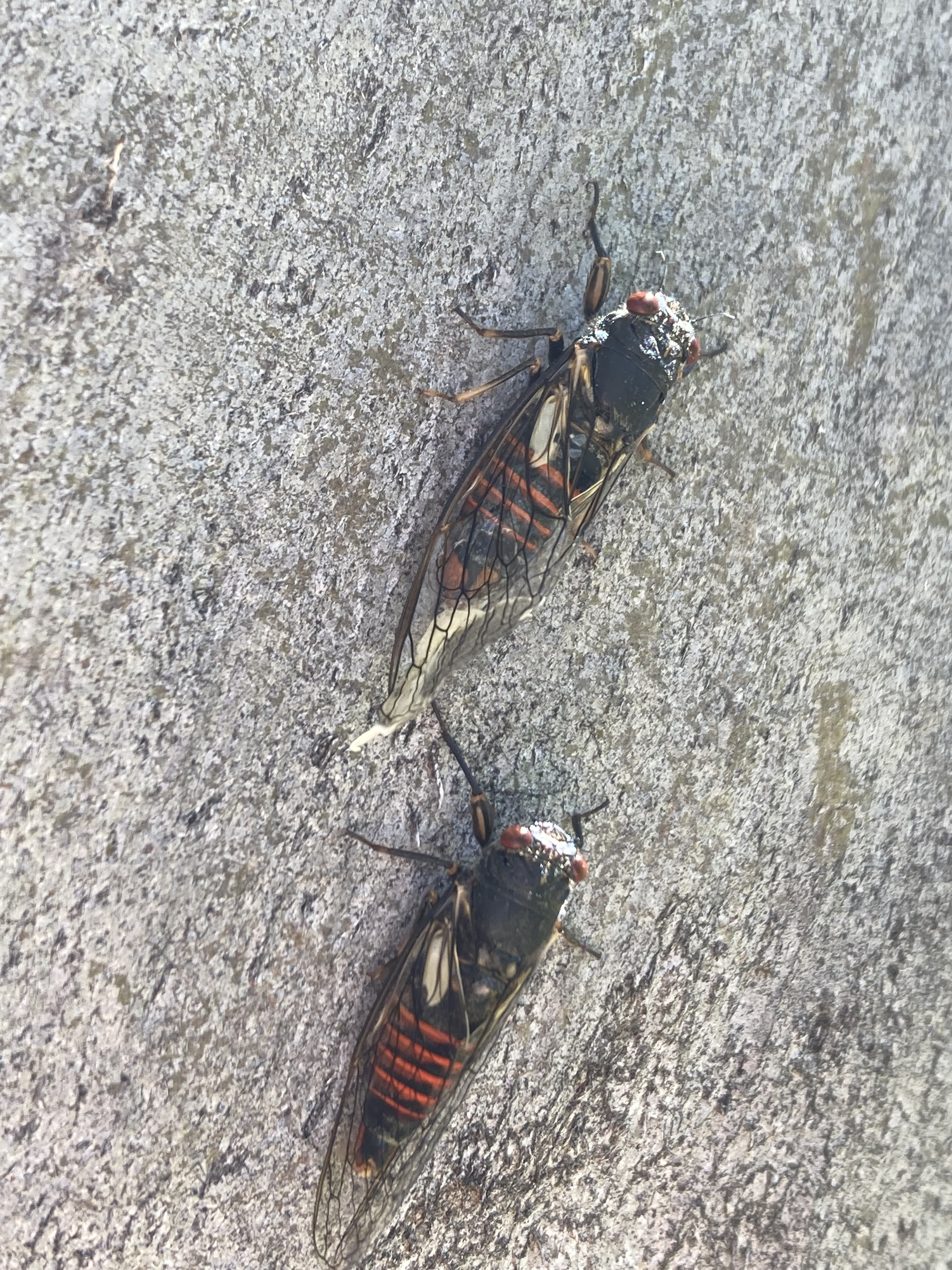
- Two adults in Hazelwood Park, Adelaide

Scientific classification
- Kingdom: Animalia
- Phylum: Arthropoda
- Clade: Pancrustacea
- Class: Insecta
- Order: Hemiptera
- Suborder: Auchenorrhyncha
- Family: Cicadidae
- Genus: Yoyetta
- Species: Y. aaede

Binomial name
- Yoyetta aaede (Walker, 1850)

Synonyms
- Cicada aaede Walker, 1850; Cicadetta aaede (Walker, 1850); Melampsalta aaede (Walker, 1850)

= Yoyetta aaede =

Species of cicada

Yoyetta aaede is a species of cicada, also known as the Adelaide firetail, in the true cicada family, Cicadettinae subfamily and Cicadettini tribe. The species is endemic to Australia. It was described in 1850 by English entomologist Francis Walker.

== Description ==
The length of the forewing is 19–22 mm.

== Distribution and habitat ==
The species is only known from Adelaide, and the adjacent Mount Lofty Ranges northwards to Spring Gully, in South Australia. Associated habitats include parkland and eucalypt woodland, especially with yellow gum trees.

== Behaviour ==
Adult males may be heard in November or December, clinging to the trunks and upper branches of eucalypts, emitting repetitive chirping calls.
