= Yoyetta darug =

Scientific classification
- Kingdom: Animalia
- Phylum: Arthropoda
- Clade: Pancrustacea
- Class: Insecta
- Order: Hemiptera
- Suborder: Auchenorrhyncha
- Family: Cicadidae
- Genus: Yoyetta
- Species: Y. darug

Binomial name
- Yoyetta darug Emery, Emery & Popple, 2025

Species of cicada

Yoyetta darug is a species of cicada, also known as the Sydney ticking ambertail, in the true cicada family, Cicadettinae subfamily and Cicadettini tribe. The species is endemic to Australia. It was described in 2025 by Australian entomologists David L. Emery, Nathan J. Emery and Lindsay Popple.

== Etymology ==
The specific epithet darug refers to the language of the Aboriginal Dharug people, who traditionally inhabited the Sydney Basin bioregion where the species is found.

== Description ==
The length of the forewing is 21–33 mm.

== Distribution and habitat ==
The species occurs at localised sites in western Sydney in New South Wales. The associated habitat is open forest on poor soil.

== Behaviour ==
Adult males may be observed clinging to the trunks of Broad-leaved Red Ironbark and Messmate Stringybark trees, or in flight, emitting simple ticking calls.
