= Pericallea katherina =

Scientific classification
- Kingdom: Animalia
- Phylum: Arthropoda
- Clade: Pancrustacea
- Class: Insecta
- Order: Hemiptera
- Suborder: Auchenorrhyncha
- Family: Cicadidae
- Genus: Pericallea
- Species: P. katherina

Binomial name
- Pericallea katherina Moulds, Marshall & Hutchinson, 2022

Species of cicada

Pericallea katherina is a species of cicada, also known as the gold silver heath-buzzer, in the true cicada family, Cicadettinae subfamily and Cicadettini tribe. The species is endemic to Australia. It was described in 2022 by Australian entomologists Maxwell Sydney Moulds, David C. Marshall and Paul M. Hutchinson.

== Description ==
The length of the forewing is 18–26 mm.

== Distribution and habitat ==
The species occurs in the Murchison bioregion of Western Australia. The associated habitat is shrubland on the edge of the arid zone.

== Behaviour ==
Adult males may be heard from late January to late February, clinging to the stems of shrubs, emitting high-pitched chirping and buzzing calls.
