= Yoyetta timothyi =

Scientific classification
- Kingdom: Animalia
- Phylum: Arthropoda
- Clade: Pancrustacea
- Class: Insecta
- Order: Hemiptera
- Suborder: Auchenorrhyncha
- Family: Cicadidae
- Genus: Yoyetta
- Species: Y. timothyi

Binomial name
- Yoyetta timothyi Emery, Emery & Popple, 2019

Species of cicada

Yoyetta timothyi, also known as the brown firetail, is a species of cicada in the true cicada family, Cicadettinae subfamily and Cicadettini tribe. The species is endemic to Australia. It was described in 2019 by Australian entomologists David L. Emery, Nathan J. Emery and Lindsay Popple.

== Etymology ==
The specific epithet timothyi honours Timothy Moulds, who collected the holotype and a series of other specimens.

== Description ==
The length of the forewing is 24–34 mm. Body length is 24–26 mm.

== Distribution and habitat ==
The species occurs from Kroombit Tops in Central Queensland southwards to Canberra in the Australian Capital Territory and Moruya in New South Wales. Associated habitats include wet sclerophyll forest, open forest with heath, and temperate woodland.

== Behaviour ==
Adult males may be heard from late September to February, clinging to the upper branches of trees, emitting repetitive, low-frequency "zop, zop, zop" calls, usually in flight, throughout the day and on moonlit nights.
