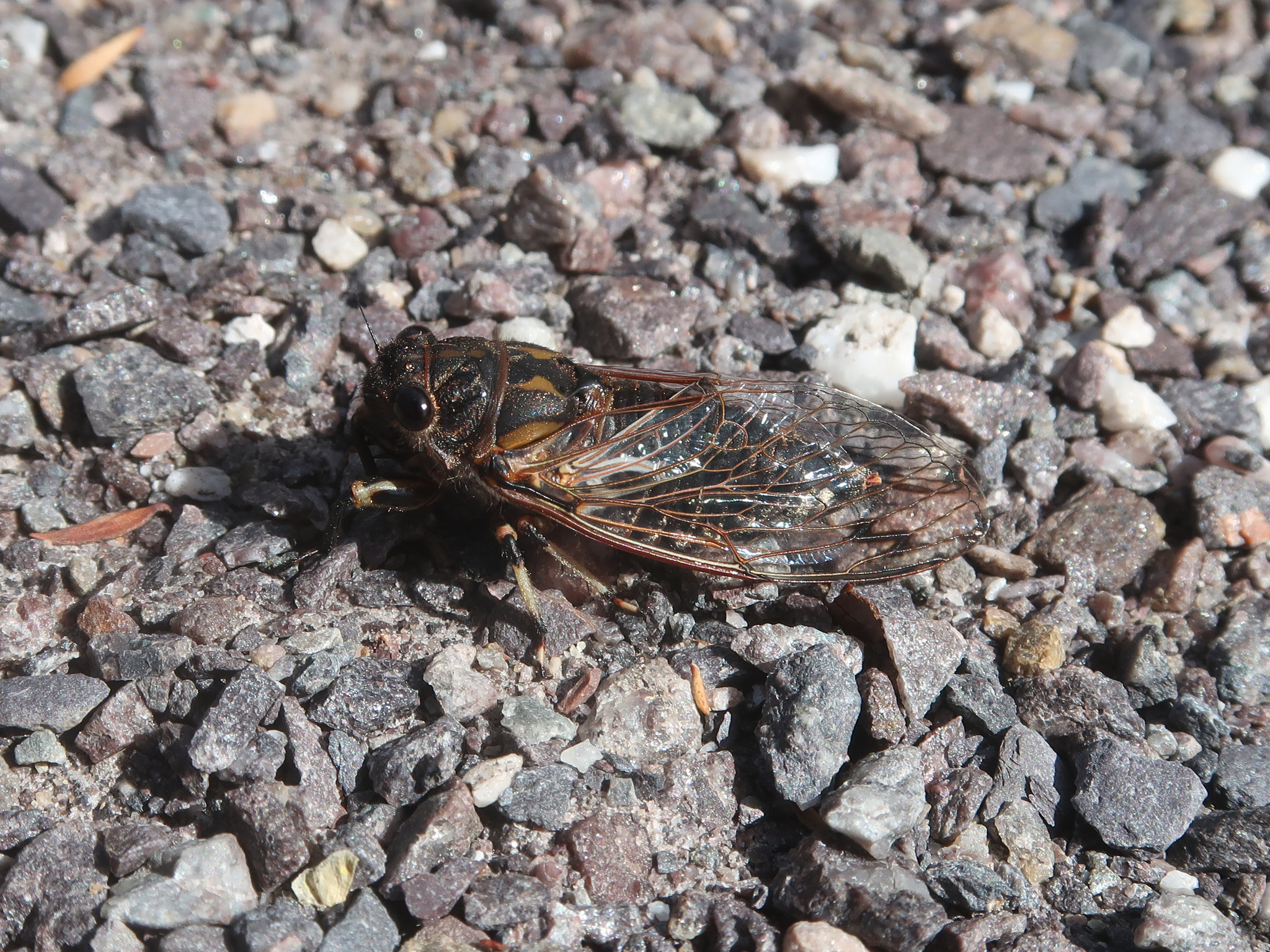

Scientific classification
- Kingdom: Animalia
- Phylum: Arthropoda
- Clade: Pancrustacea
- Class: Insecta
- Order: Hemiptera
- Suborder: Auchenorrhyncha
- Family: Cicadidae
- Genus: Diemeniana
- Species: D. cincta

Binomial name
- Diemeniana cincta (Fabricius, 1803)

Synonyms
- Abricta cincta Fabricius, 1803; Diemeniana tillyardi Hardy, 1918

= Diemeniana cincta =

Species of cicada

Diemeniana cincta is a species of cicada, also known as the Tasman twanger, in the true cicada family, Cicadettinae subfamily and Cicadettini tribe. It is endemic to Australia. It was described in 1803 by Danish entomologist Johan Christian Fabricius.

== Description ==
The length of the forewing is 21–23 mm.

== Distribution and habitat ==
The species occurs in western and southern Tasmania. The associated habitat is cool temperate shrubland.

== Behaviour ==
Adults emerge from December to February, clinging to the stems and foliage of low shrubs.
