= Yoyetta repetens =

Scientific classification
- Kingdom: Animalia
- Phylum: Arthropoda
- Clade: Pancrustacea
- Class: Insecta
- Order: Hemiptera
- Suborder: Auchenorrhyncha
- Family: Cicadidae
- Genus: Yoyetta
- Species: Y. repetens

Binomial name
- Yoyetta repetens Emery, Emery & Popple, 2015

Species of cicada

Yoyetta repetens is a species of cicada, also known as the zipping ambertail, in the true cicada family, Cicadettinae subfamily and Cicadettini tribe. The species is endemic to Australia. It was described in 2015 by Australian entomologists Nathan J. Emery, David L. Emery and Lindsay Popple.

== Description ==
The length of the forewing is 21–26 mm.

== Distribution and habitat ==
The species occurs in eastern New South Wales between western Sydney and Goulburn, with an isolated population in the Mogo area. The associated habitat is eucalypt woodland, including parkland and remnant roadside vegetation.

== Behaviour ==
Adult males may be heard from November to January, clinging to the trunks and upper branches of eucalypts, including grey box trees, emitting strident zipping calls.
