= Hea (cicada) =

Scientific classification
- Kingdom: Animalia
- Phylum: Arthropoda
- Clade: Pancrustacea
- Class: Insecta
- Order: Hemiptera
- Suborder: Auchenorrhyncha
- Family: Cicadidae
- Tribe: Cicadettini
- Genus: Hea; Distant, 1906

Synonyms
- Kinoshitaia Ôuchi, 1938

Genus of true bugs

Hea is a genus of cicadas in the tribe Cicadettini erected by William Lucas Distant in 1906. Species of Hea have been recorded from the Himalayas, China and Indochina.

== Species ==
The World Auchenorrhyncha Database includes:

1. Hea choui Lei, 1992^{c g}
2. Hea fasciata Distant, 1906^{c g}
3. Hea qiuae Wang, 2023
4. Hea yunnanensis Chou & Yao, 1995^{c g}

Data sources: i = ITIS, c = Catalogue of Life, g = GBIF, b = Bugguide.net
