= Ewartia (cicada) =

Scientific classification
- Kingdom: Animalia
- Phylum: Arthropoda
- Clade: Pancrustacea
- Class: Insecta
- Order: Hemiptera
- Suborder: Auchenorrhyncha
- Infraorder: Cicadomorpha
- Superfamily: Cicadoidea
- Family: Cicadidae
- Subfamily: Cicadettinae
- Genus: Ewartia; Moulds, 2012

Genus of cicadas

Ewartia is a genus of cicadas, also known as wattle cicadas, in the family Cicadidae, subfamily Cicadettinae and tribe Cicadettini. It is endemic to Australia. It was described in 2012 by Australian entomologist Maxwell Sydney Moulds.

== Etymology ==
The genus name Ewartia honours entomologist Tony Ewart for his contributions to knowledge about Australian cicadas.

== Species ==
As of 2025 there were nine described species in the genus:

- Ewartia adusta Moulds & Marshall, 2022) (Sporty Wattle Cicada)
- Ewartia brevis (Ashton, 1912) (Cooktown Wattle Cicada)
- Ewartia carina Popple, 2017) (Cape York Wattle Cicada)
- Ewartia cuensis (Distant, 1913) (Western Wattle Cicada)
- Ewartia etesia Popple, 2017) (Northern Wattle Cicada)
- Ewartia lapidosa Popple, 2017) (Inland Wattle Cicada)
- Ewartia oldfieldi (Distant, 1883) (Broad-striped Wattle Cicada)
- Ewartia roberti Popple, 2017) (Thin-striped Wattle Cicada)
- Ewartia thamna Popple, 2017) (Shrub Wattle Cicada)
