= Tettigettula pygmea =

Scientific classification
- Kingdom: Animalia
- Phylum: Arthropoda
- Clade: Pancrustacea
- Class: Insecta
- Order: Hemiptera
- Suborder: Auchenorrhyncha
- Family: Cicadidae
- Genus: Tettigettula
- Species: T. pygmea

Binomial name
- Tettigettula pygmea (Olivier, 1790)

Species of insect

Tettigettula pygmea is a species of singing cicada. It is primarily found in southern Europe, with confirmed records from places like Greece.
