= Atrapsalta =

Scientific classification
- Kingdom: Animalia
- Phylum: Arthropoda
- Class: Insecta
- Order: Hemiptera
- Suborder: Auchenorrhyncha
- Family: Cicadidae
- Genus: Atrapsalta; Owen & Moulds, 2016

Genus of insects

Atrapsalta is a genus of cicadas, also known as squeakers, belonging to the family Cicadidae. The species of this genus are found in Australia.

== Etymology ==
The genus name Atrapsalta is a combination derived from Latin atra (‘black’), with reference to the colouring of most species, and psalta (from psaltria - a female harpist), a suffix traditionally used in many cicada genera.

== Species ==
- Atrapsalta audax Popple & Stolarski, 2024 (Adelaide Black Squeaker)
- Atrapsalta collina (Ewart, 1989) (Sandstone Squeaker)
- Atrapsalta corticina (Ewart, 1989) (Bark Squeaker)
- Atrapsalta dolens (Walker, 1850) (South-western Bark Squeaker)
- Atrapsalta emmotti (Owen & Moulds, 2016) (Channel Country Squeaker)
- Atrapsalta encaustica (Germar, 1834) (Black Squeaker)
- Atrapsalta furcilla Owen & Moulds, 2016 (Southern Mountain Squeaker)
- Atrapsalta fuscata (Ewart, 1989) (Small Bark Squeaker)
- Atrapsalta siccana (Ewart, 1989) (Bulloak Squeaker)
- Atrapsalta vinea Owen & Moulds, 2016 (Clare Valley Squeaker)
