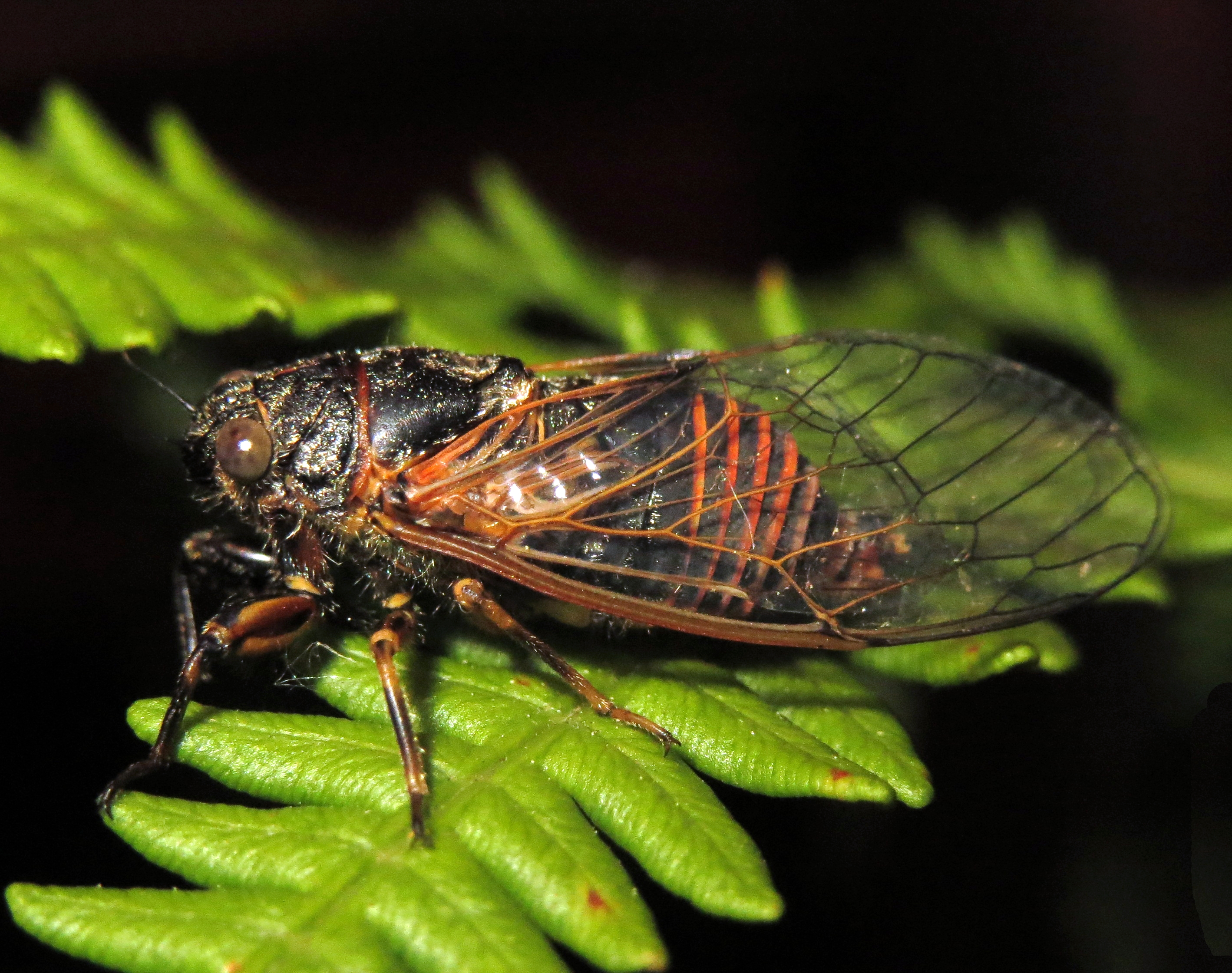
- Oligoglena tibialis

Scientific classification
- Kingdom: Animalia
- Phylum: Arthropoda
- Class: Insecta
- Order: Hemiptera
- Suborder: Auchenorrhyncha
- Family: Cicadidae
- Subfamily: Cicadettinae
- Tribe: Cicadettini
- Genus: Oligoglena; Horváth, 1912

Synonyms
- Cicadivetta Boulard, 1982; Helptoglena Horváth, 1911; Heptaglena Horváth, 1911; Mezammira Gogala, Puissant & Trilar, 2017

= Oligoglena =

Genus of true bugs

Oligoglena is a genus of mostly Palaearctic cicadas belonging to the tribe Cicadettini; it was erected by Géza Horváth in 1911. Species are mostly recorded from southern (mainland) Europe, North Africa and western Asia.

== Species ==
The World Auchenorrhyncha Database includes:

1. Oligoglena carayoni (Boulard, 1982)
2. Oligoglena filoti (Gogala & Trilar, 2017)
3. Oligoglena flaveola (Brullé, 1832)
4. Oligoglena gogalai Mol, 2020
5. Oligoglena goumenissa (Gogala, Drosopoulos & Trilar, 2012)
6. Oligoglena iphigenia (Emeljanov, 1996)
7. Oligoglena parvula (Fieber, 1876)
  – type species (as Heptaglena libanotica Horváth, 1911 by original designation of Oligoglena)
8. Oligoglena popovi (Emeljanov, 1996)
9. Oligoglena sakisi (Gogala & Trilar, 2017)
10. Oligoglena sirintaylan Mol, 2023
11. Oligoglena sibilatrix (Horváth, 1901)
12. Oligoglena tibialis (Panzer, 1798)
13. Oligoglena turcica (Schedl, 2001)
