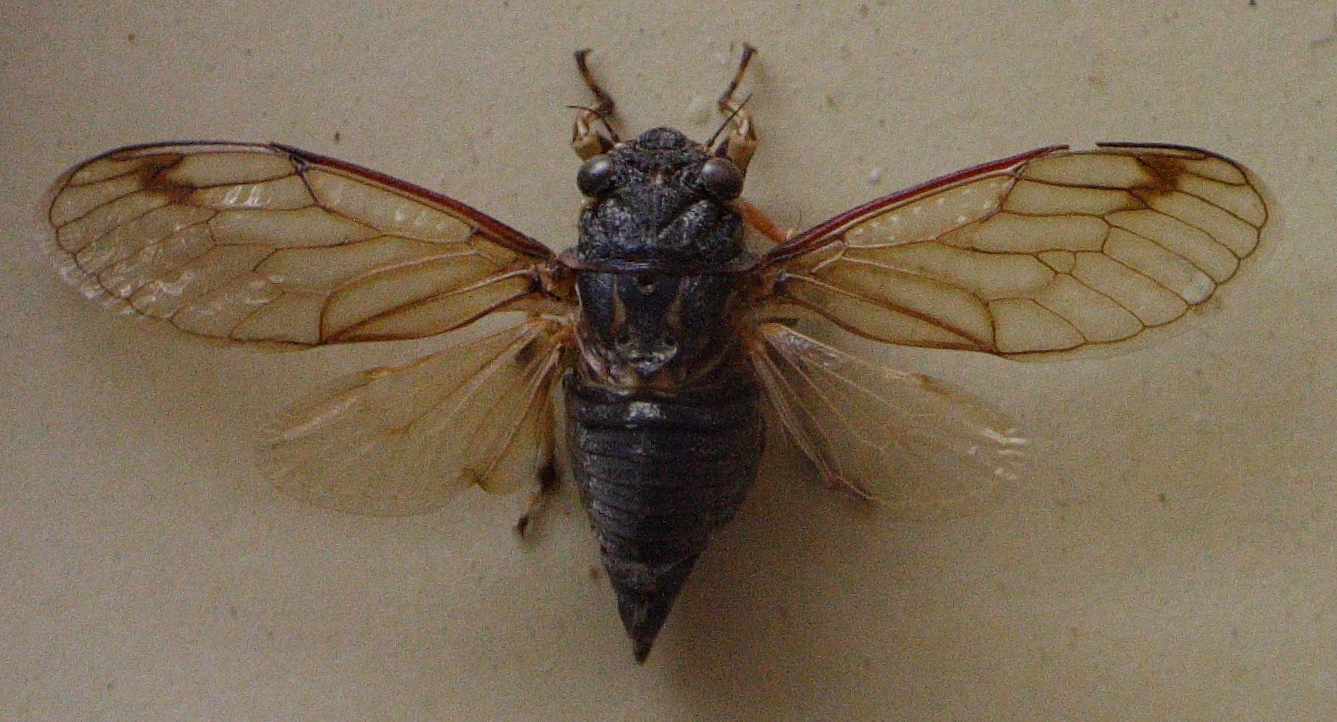
- Diemeniana frenchi specimen in the Australian Museum

Scientific classification
- Kingdom: Animalia
- Phylum: Arthropoda
- Clade: Pancrustacea
- Class: Insecta
- Order: Hemiptera
- Suborder: Auchenorrhyncha
- Family: Cicadidae
- Subfamily: Cicadettinae
- Tribe: Cicadettini
- Genus: Diemeniana; Distant, 1905

= Diemeniana =

Genus of true bugs

Diemeniana is a genus of cicadas, also known as twangers or crop dusters, in the Cicadettini tribe of the Cicadinae subfamily. It is native to Australia.

== Species ==
Five species have been described.

- Diemeniana cincta (Fabricius, 1803) (Tasman Twanger)
- Diemeniana euronotiana (Kirkaldy, 1909) (Golden Twanger)
- Diemeniana frenchi (Distant, 1907) (Crop Duster)
- Diemeniana hirsuta (Goding & Froggatt, 1904) (Black Twanger)
- Diemeniana neboissi Burns, 1958 (Auburn Crop Duster)
