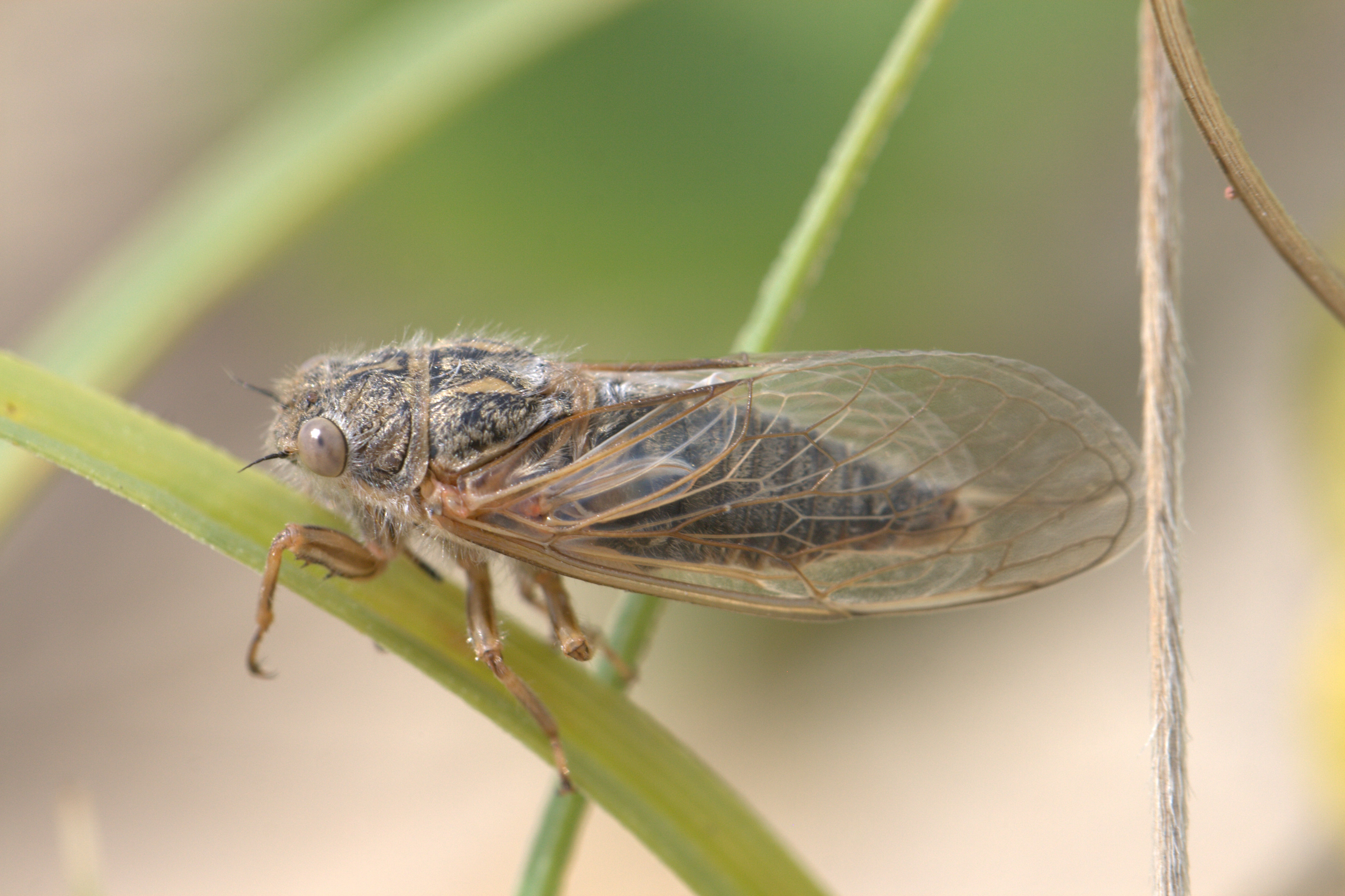
- Sylphoides arenaria

Scientific classification
- Kingdom: Animalia
- Phylum: Arthropoda
- Clade: Pancrustacea
- Class: Insecta
- Order: Hemiptera
- Suborder: Auchenorrhyncha
- Infraorder: Cicadomorpha
- Superfamily: Cicadoidea
- Family: Cicadidae
- Subfamily: Cicadettinae
- Genus: Sylphoides; Moulds, 2012

= Sylphoides =

Genus of cicadas

Sylphoides is a monotypic genus of cicadas in the family Cicadidae, subfamily Cicadettinae and tribe Cicadettini. It is endemic to Australia. It was described in 2012 by Australian entomologist Maxwell Sydney Moulds.

== Etymology ==
The genus name Sylphoides is derived from French sylphe, meaning a fairy-like spirit of the air.

== Species ==
As of 2025 there was one described species in the genus:

- Sylphoides arenaria (Distant, 1907) (Sand Fairy)
