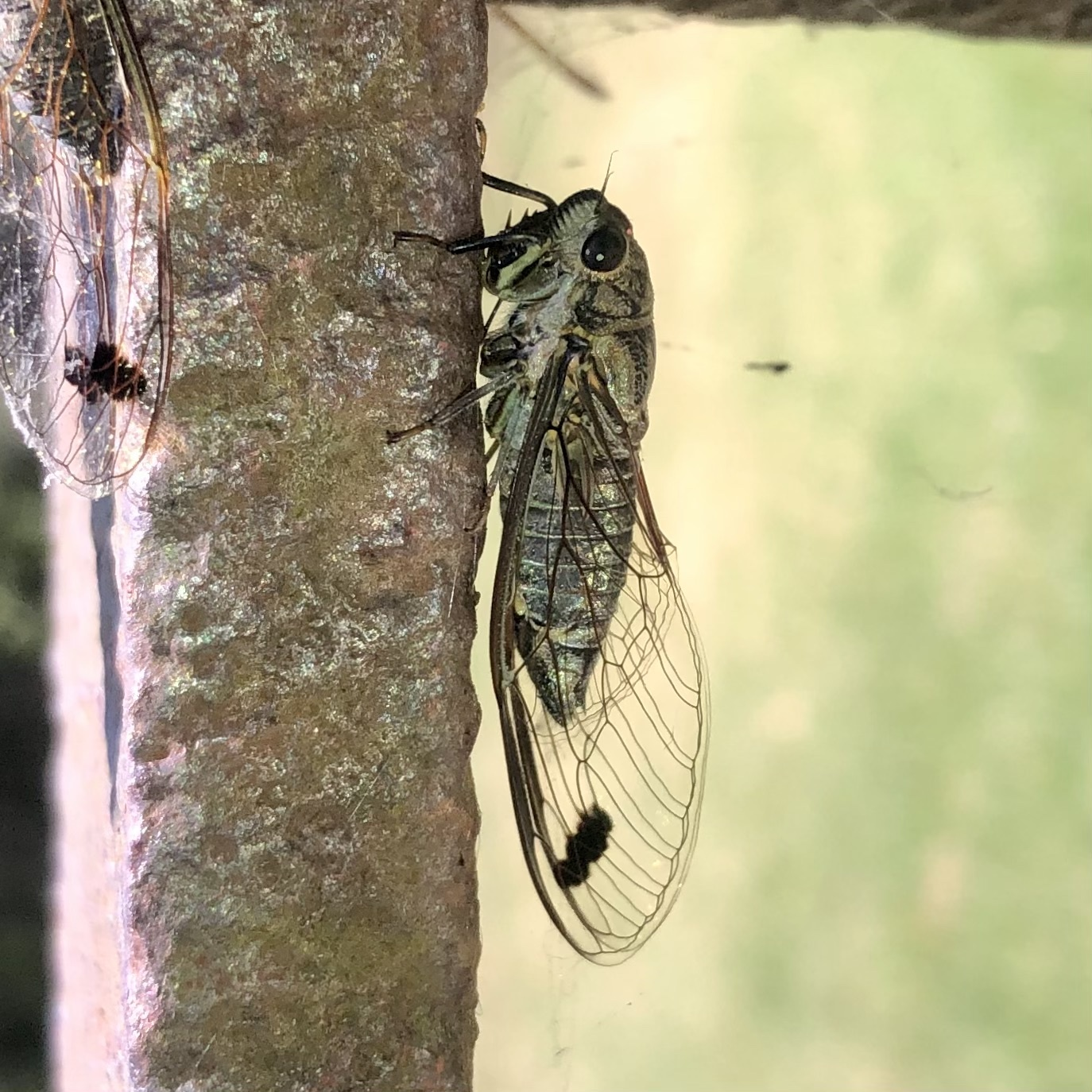

Scientific classification
- Kingdom: Animalia
- Phylum: Arthropoda
- Clade: Pancrustacea
- Class: Insecta
- Order: Hemiptera
- Suborder: Auchenorrhyncha
- Family: Cicadidae
- Subfamily: Cicadettinae
- Genus: Galanga; Moulds, 2012

= Galanga =

Genus of cicadas

Galanga is a monotypic genus of cicadas in the family Cicadidae, subfamily Cicadettinae and tribe Cicadettini. It was described in 2012 by Australian entomologist Maxwell Sydney Moulds. The single species occurs in subtropical and warm temperate eastern Australia.

== Etymology ==
The genus name Galanga was the indigenous name for cicadas used by Aboriginal Australians in the vicinity of what is now Sydney.

== Species ==
As of 2025 there was one described species in the genus:

- Galanga labeculata (Distant, 1882) (Double-spotted Cicada, Spotted Wattle Cicada)

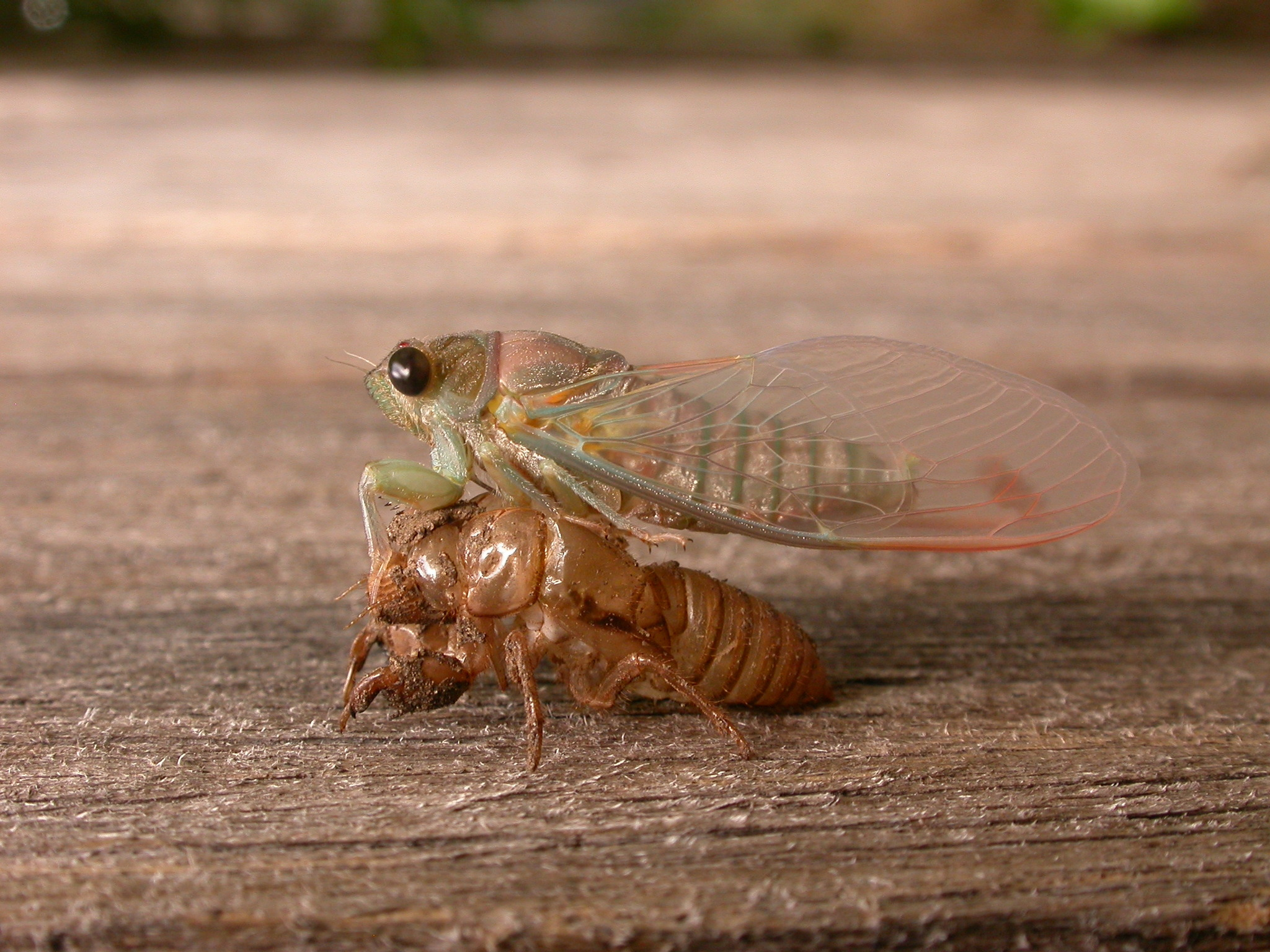
Galanga labeculata
