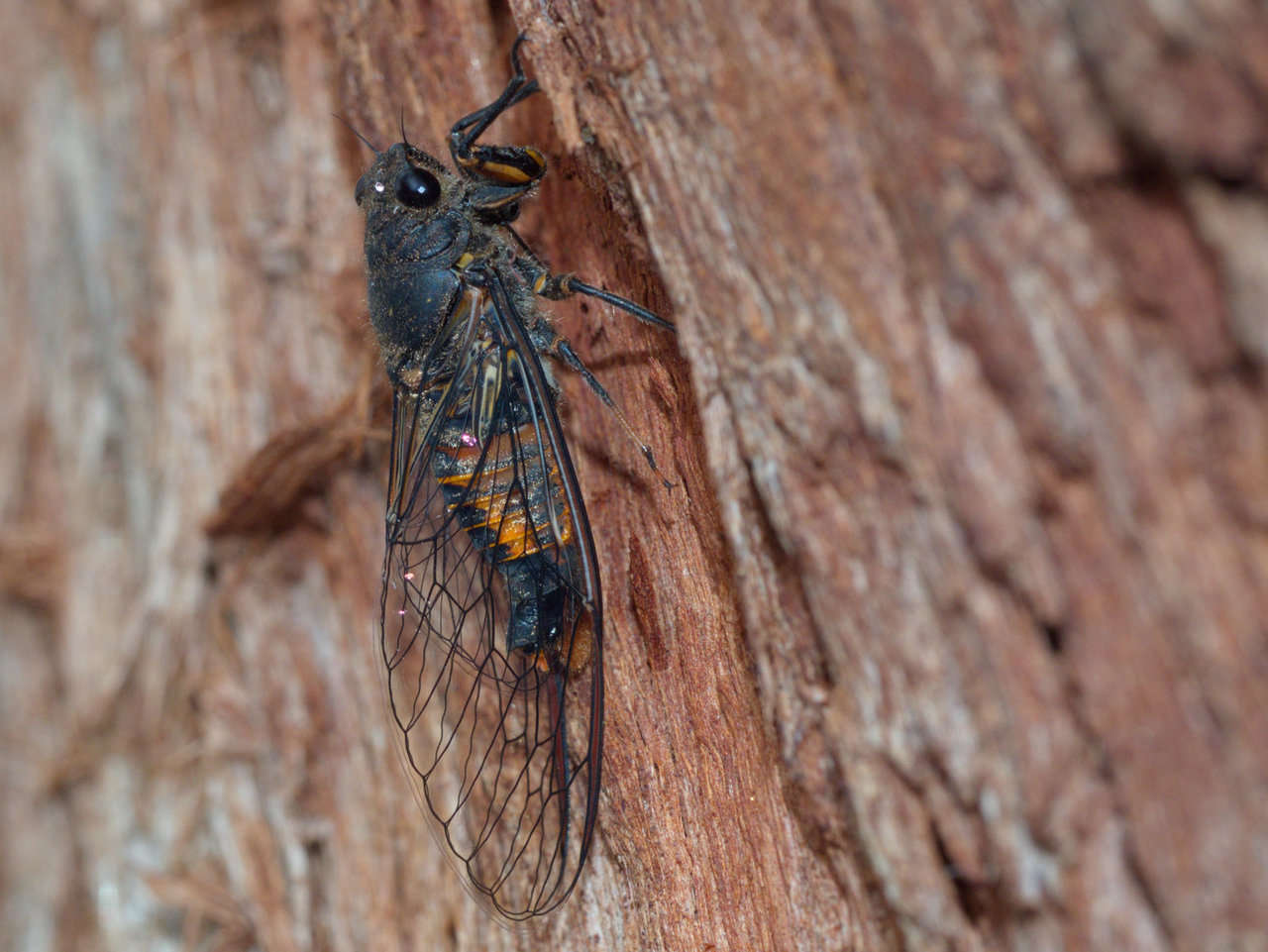
- Yoyetta robertsonae, Victoria, Australia

Scientific classification
- Kingdom: Animalia
- Phylum: Arthropoda
- Clade: Pancrustacea
- Class: Insecta
- Order: Hemiptera
- Suborder: Auchenorrhyncha
- Family: Cicadidae
- Subfamily: Cicadettinae
- Tribe: Cicadettini
- Genus: Yoyetta; Moulds, 2012

= Yoyetta =

Genus of true bugs

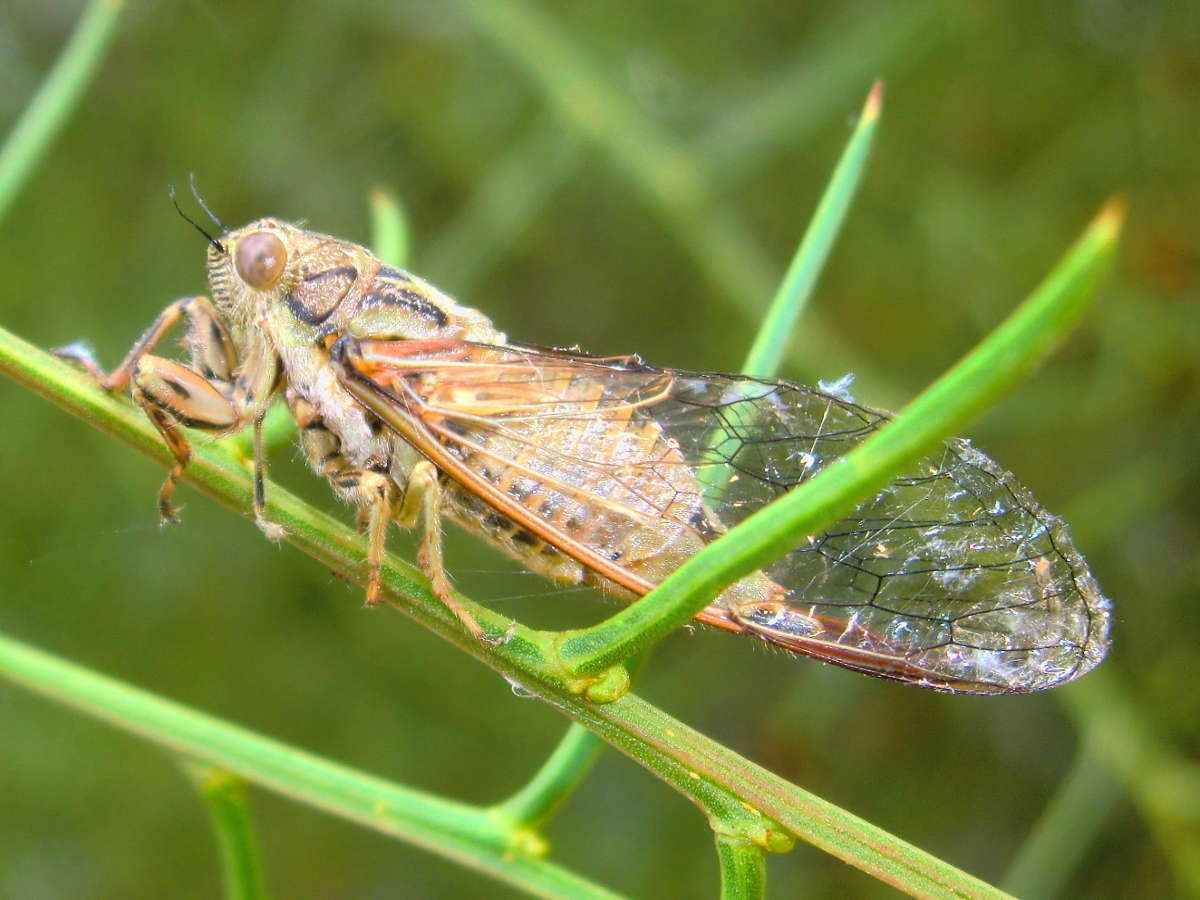
Yoyetta celis, Victoria, Australia

Yoyetta is a genus of cicadas, mostly known as ambertails or firetails, in the family Cicadidae. The genus was described in 2012 to accommodate nine Australian species previously assigned to the genus Cicadetta. The genus is native to Australia.

== Species ==
As of 2025 there were 39 described species:

- Yoyetta aaede (F.Walker, 1850) (Adelaide Firetail)
- Yoyetta abdominalis (Distant, 1892) (Golden-haired Firetail)
- Yoyetta australicta Popple & Emery, 2022 (Southern Ticking Ambertail)
- Yoyetta bushi Emery, 2025
- Yoyetta celis (Moulds, 1988) (Silver Princess)
- Yoyetta corbinorum Emery, 2025
- Yoyetta corindi Popple & Emery, 2022 (North Coast Ambertail)
- Yoyetta crepita Emery, 2025
- Yoyetta cumberlandi Emery, Emery & Popple, 2015 (Cumberland Ambertail)
- Yoyetta darug Emery, Emery & Popple, 2025 (Sydney Ticking Ambertail)
- Yoyetta delicata Popple & Emery, 2022 (Delicate Ambertail)
- Yoyetta denisoni (Distant, 1893) (Black Firetail)
- Yoyetta douglasi Popple & Emery, 2020 (Grampians Firetail)
- Yoyetta electrica Emery, Emery & Popple, 2019 (Rattling Firetail)
- Yoyetta enigmatica Popple & Emery, 2020 (Restless Firetail)
- Yoyetta fluviatilis Emery, Emery & Popple, 2015 (River Ambertail)
- Yoyetta fumea Emery, Emery & Popple, 2025 (Smoky-winged Ambertail)
- Yoyetta grandis Emery, Emery & Popple, 2019 Red-eyed Firetail)
- Yoyetta humphreyae Moulds & Popple, 2018 (Varied Ambertail)
- Yoyetta hunterorum (Moulds, 1988) (Sydney Treetop Ticker)
- Yoyetta ignita Popple & Emery, 2022 Fiery Ambertail)
- Yoyetta incepta (F.Walker, 1850) (False Ambertail)
- Yoyetta kershawi (Goding & Froggatt, 1904) (Victorian Firetail)
- Yoyetta landsboroughi (Distant, 1882) (Small Bassian Ambertail)
- Yoyetta loftyensis Popple & Emery, 2020 (Mount Lofty Firetail)
- Yoyetta nathani Emery, 2025
- Yoyetta ngarabal Popple & Emery, 2020 (Glade Firetail)
- Yoyetta nigrimontana Emery, Emery & Popple, 2015 (Small Southern Ambertail)
- Yoyetta psammitica Emery, Emery & Popple, 2025 (Sandstone Ambertail)
- Yoyetta regalis Emery, Emery & Popple, 2019 (Red Ringer)
- Yoyetta repetens Emery, Emery & Popple, 2015 (Zipping Ambertail)
- Yoyetta robertsonae Moulds, Popple & Emery, 2020 (Clicking Ambertail)
- Yoyetta robusta Popple & Emery, 2022 (Robust Ambertail)
- Yoyetta serrata Emery, Emery & Popple, 2019 (Serrated Firetail)
- Yoyetta spectabilis Emery, Emery & Popple, 2019 (Wavering Firetail)
- Yoyetta subalpina Emery, Emery & Popple, 2019 (Subalpine Firetail)
- Yoyetta timothyi Emery, Emery & Popple, 2019 (Brown Firetail)
- Yoyetta tristrigata (Goding & Froggatt, 1904) (Tropical Ambertail)
- Yoyetta verrens Emery, Emery & Popple, 2019 (Sweeping Firetail)
