= Yoyetta abdominalis =

Scientific classification
- Kingdom: Animalia
- Phylum: Arthropoda
- Clade: Pancrustacea
- Class: Insecta
- Order: Hemiptera
- Suborder: Auchenorrhyncha
- Family: Cicadidae
- Genus: Yoyetta
- Species: Y. abdominalis

Binomial name
- Yoyetta abdominalis (Distant, 1892)

Synonyms
- Melampsalta abdominalis (Distant, 1892); Cicadetta abdominalis (Distant, 1892)

Species of cicada

Yoyetta abdominalis, also known as the golden-haired firetail, is a species of cicada, in the true cicada family, Cicadettinae. It is endemic to Australia. It was first described in 1892 by English entomologist William Lucas Distant.

== Description ==
The length of the forewing is 22–29 mm.

== Distribution and habitat ==
The species occurs from the Brindabella Range in the Australian Capital Territory southwards and westwards through much of Victoria to south-eastern South Australia, with an isolated population near Orange in central New South Wales. It also occurs in eastern Tasmania. Associated habitats include cool temperate eucalypt forest and subalpine woodland.

== Behaviour ==
Adult males may be heard from November to January, clinging to the upper branches of trees, emitting brief calls terminating in a sharp “tick”.
