= Simona (cicada) =

Scientific classification
- Kingdom: Animalia
- Phylum: Arthropoda
- Clade: Pancrustacea
- Class: Insecta
- Order: Hemiptera
- Suborder: Auchenorrhyncha
- Family: Cicadidae
- Genus: Simona; Moulds, 2012

Genus of true bugs

Simona is a genus of cicadas in the family Cicadidae in the true cicada family, Cicadettinae subfamily and Cicadettini tribe. It is endemic to Australia. It was described in 2012 by Australian entomologist Maxwell Sydney Moulds.

== Species ==
As of 2025 there were three described species in the genus:

- Simona erema Ewart, Popple & Marshall, 2015 (Roaring Senna Cicada)
- Simona retracta Ewart, Popple & Marshall, 2015 (Charleville Eremophila Cicada)
- Simona sancta (Distant, 1913) (Western Eremophila Cicada)
