= Punia kolos =

Scientific classification
- Kingdom: Animalia
- Phylum: Arthropoda
- Clade: Pancrustacea
- Class: Insecta
- Order: Hemiptera
- Suborder: Auchenorrhyncha
- Family: Cicadidae
- Genus: Punia
- Species: P. kolos

Binomial name
- Punia kolos Moulds, 2020

Species of cicada

Punia kolos is a species of cicada, also known as the small grass pygmy, in the true cicada family, Cicadettinae subfamily and Cicadettini tribe. The species is endemic to Australia. It was described in 2020 by Australian entomologist Maxwell Sydney Moulds.

== Etymology ==
The specific epithet kolos (Greek: 'shortened' or 'curtailed') refers to the reduced uncus and claspers in the genitalia of male cicadas.

== Description ==
The length of the forewing is 9–12 mm.

== Distribution and habitat ==
The species is known from the Top End of the Northern Territory, from the South Alligator River in Kakadu National Park southwards to Katherine. The associated habitat is open grassland.

== Behaviour ==
Adult males may be heard from November to January.
