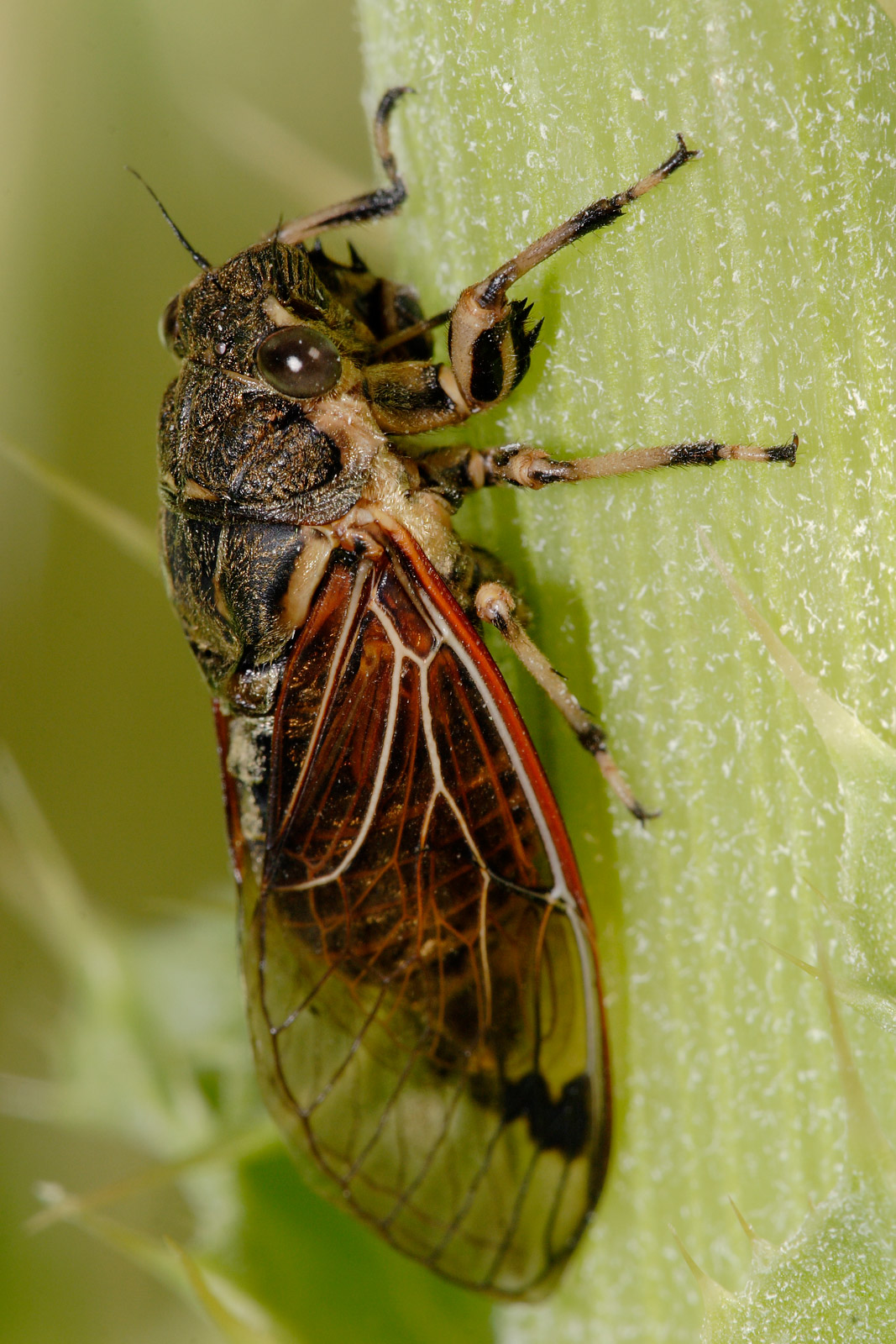
- Resting on a milk thistle

Scientific classification
- Kingdom: Animalia
- Phylum: Arthropoda
- Clade: Pancrustacea
- Class: Insecta
- Order: Hemiptera
- Suborder: Auchenorrhyncha
- Family: Cicadidae
- Genus: Diemeniana
- Species: D. frenchi

Binomial name
- Diemeniana frenchi Distant, 1907

= Diemeniana frenchi =

Species of true bug

Diemeniana frenchi is a species of cicada in the Cicadinae subfamily, native to Victoria and New South Wales in Australia. It was described by William Lucas Distant in 1907.
