= Punia hyas =

Scientific classification
- Kingdom: Animalia
- Phylum: Arthropoda
- Clade: Pancrustacea
- Class: Insecta
- Order: Hemiptera
- Suborder: Auchenorrhyncha
- Family: Cicadidae
- Genus: Punia
- Species: P. hyas

Binomial name
- Punia hyas Moulds, 2020

Species of cicada

Punia hyas is a species of cicada, also known as the Top End grass pygmy, in the true cicada family, Cicadettinae subfamily and Cicadettini tribe. The species is endemic to Australia. It was described in 2020 by Australian entomologist Maxwell Sydney Moulds.

== Etymology ==
The specific epithet hyas is derived from Latin Hyas, a star in the constellation Taurus whose rising at dawn presaged the onset of the wet season, with reference to the monsoonal climate of the species’ range.

== Description ==
The length of the forewing is 10–14 mm.

== Distribution and habitat ==
The species is known from the tropical eastern Kimberley region of Western Australia and Top End of the Northern Territory eastwards to Borroloola, as well as an isolated occurrence on Groote Eylandt. Associated habitats are open grassland and grassy woodland.
