= Punia minima =

Scientific classification
- Kingdom: Animalia
- Phylum: Arthropoda
- Clade: Pancrustacea
- Class: Insecta
- Order: Hemiptera
- Suborder: Auchenorrhyncha
- Family: Cicadidae
- Genus: Punia
- Species: P. minima

Binomial name
- Punia minima (Goding & Froggatt, 1904)

Synonyms
- Pauropsalta minima Goding & Froggatt, 1904; Melampsalta minima Burns, 1957; Cicadetta minima Moulds, 1990

Species of true bug

Punia minima is a cicada in the family Cicadidae. It is also known as the pale grass pygmy. It is native to Western Australia and the Northern Territory, Australia. In 2012, P. minima was placed in a monotypic genus, Punia; however, in 2020, four new species were described in the genus.

Punia minima is a very small cicada with a wingspan of only 10–13 mm.
