= Punia (cicada) =

Scientific classification
- Kingdom: Animalia
- Phylum: Arthropoda
- Clade: Pancrustacea
- Class: Insecta
- Order: Hemiptera
- Suborder: Auchenorrhyncha
- Family: Cicadidae
- Tribe: Cicadettini
- Genus: Punia; Moulds, 2012

Type species
- Pauropsalta minima Golding & Froggatt, 1904

Species
- 5, see text.

Genus of true bugs

Punia is a genus of cicadas in the family Cicadidae endemic to Australia. Members of the genus are called grass pygmies. They are found in Western Australia, the Northern Territory and Queensland. The genus was considered to be monotypic, only containing P. minima, until the 2020 description of four congeners.

== Species ==
As of 2025 there were five described species:

- Punia hyas Moulds, 2020 (Top End Grass Pygmy)
- Punia kolos Moulds, 2020 (Small Grass Pygmy)
- Punia limpida Moulds, 2020 (Green Grass Pygmy)
- Punia minima (Goding & Froggatt, 1904) (Pale Grass Pygmy)
- Punia queenslandica Moulds, 2020 (Eastern Grass Pygmy)
