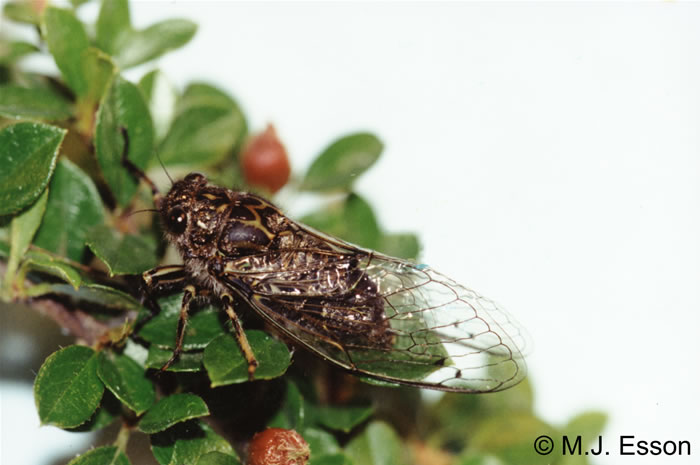
- Amphipsalta strepitans

Scientific classification
- Kingdom: Animalia
- Phylum: Arthropoda
- Class: Insecta
- Order: Hemiptera
- Suborder: Auchenorrhyncha
- Family: Cicadidae
- Subfamily: Cicadettinae
- Tribe: Cicadettini; Buckton, 1890

Diversity
- at least 110 genera

= Cicadettini =

Tribe of cicada insects

Cicadettini is a tribe of cicadas in the family Cicadidae. There are more than 520 described species in Cicadettini, found worldwide except for the Neotropics.

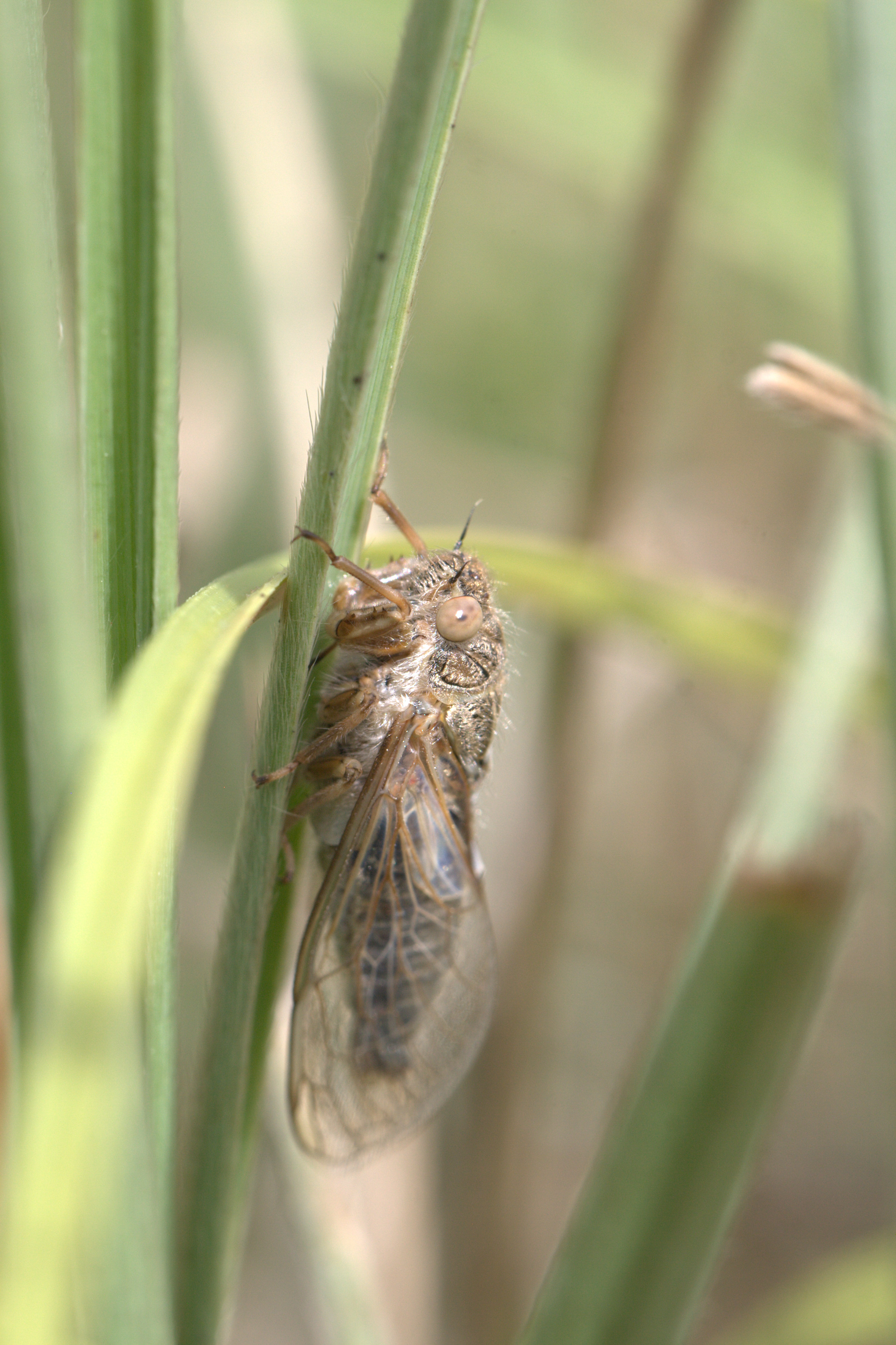
Sylphoides arenaria (Australia)

== Selected genera ==
- Adelia Moulds, 2012
- Amphipsalta Fleming, 1969
- Cicadetta Kolenati, 1857 - type genus
- Cicadettana Marshall & Hill, 2017
- Diemeniana Distant, 1906
- Euboeana Gogala, Trilar & Drosopoulos, 2011 (monotypic E. castaneivaga from Greece)
- Ewartia Moulds, 2012
- Galanga Moulds, 2012
- Hea Distant, 1906
- Huechys Amyot & Audinet-Serville, 1843
- Kanakia Distant, 1892
- Kikihia Dugdale, 1972
- Maoricicada Dugdale, 1972
- Notopsalta Dugdale, 1972
- Oligoglena Horvath, 1912
- Punia Moulds, 2012
- Rhodopsalta Dugdale, 1972
- Saticula Stål, 1866
- Scolopita Chou & Lei, 1997
- Simona Moulds, 2012
- Yoyetta Moulds, 2012

== See also ==
- List of Cicadettini genera
