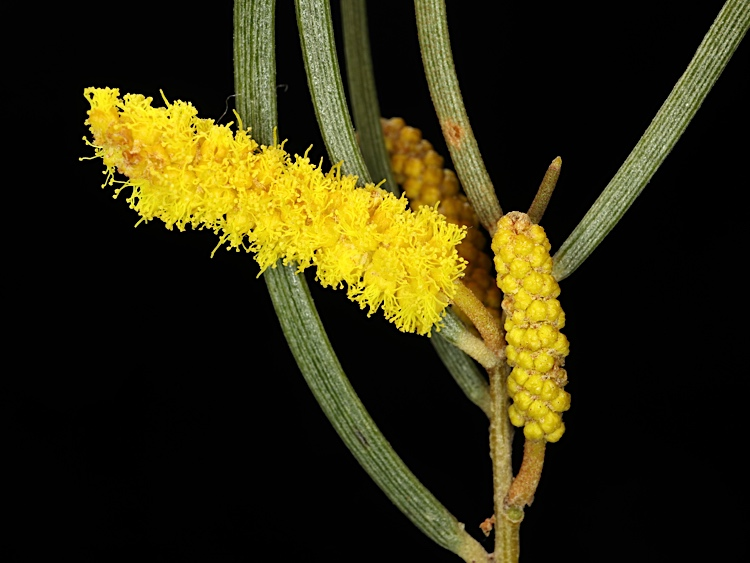
- In the ANBG

Conservation status
- Least Concern (IUCN 3.1)

Scientific classification
- Kingdom: Plantae
- Clade: Tracheophytes
- Clade: Angiosperms
- Clade: Eudicots
- Clade: Rosids
- Order: Fabales
- Family: Fabaceae
- Subfamily: Caesalpinioideae
- Clade: Mimosoid clade
- Genus: Acacia
- Species: A. aptaneura

Binomial name
- Acacia aptaneura Maslin & J.E.Reid
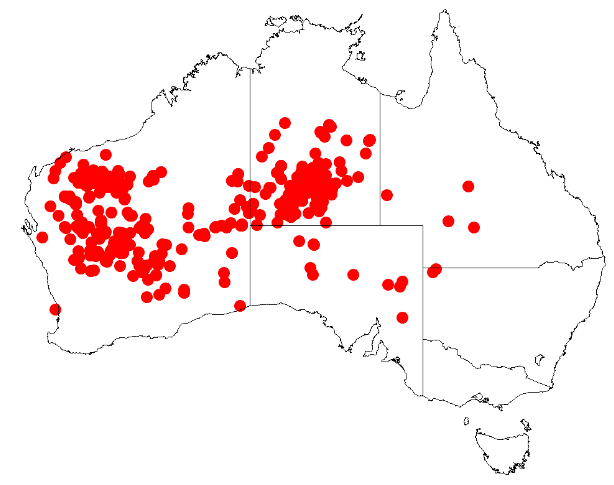
- Occurrence data from Australasian Virtual Herbarium

Synonyms
- Acacia aneura var. pilbarana Pedley; Acacia aneura var. tenuis Pedley; Racosperma aneurum var. pilbaranum (Pedley) Pedley; Racosperma aneurum var. tenue (Pedley) Pedley

= Acacia aptaneura =

Species of plant

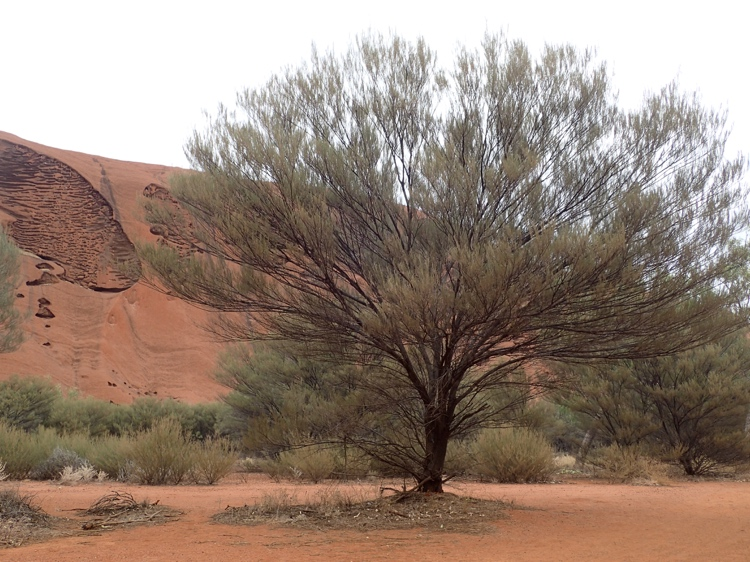
In Uluru-Kata Tjuta National Park

Acacia aptaneura, commonly known as slender mulga, is a species of flowering plant in the family Fabaceae and is endemic to central and western parts of Australia. It is usually an inverted cone-shaped or rounded shrub or tree, with linear or narrowly oblong phyllodes, spikes of golden-yellow flowers, and oblong to narrowly oblong pods up to 60 mm (2.4 in) long.

== Description ==
Acacia aptaneura is an inverted cone-shaped or rounded shrub or tree that typically grows to a height of 3–10 m (9.8–32.8 ft) sometimes to 12 m (39 ft), and sometimes with a conifer-like growth form. Its new shoots and branchlets are covered with resin. The phyllodes are narrowly linear or narrowly oblong, flat, straight to round in cross section, mostly 40–100 mm (1.6–3.9 in) long, 0.8–1.5 mm (0.031–0.059 in) wide and green to grey-green. There is a gland on the edge of the phyllode near its base.

The flowers are golden and borne in cylindrical spikes mostly 10–30 mm (0.39–1.18 in) long on a peduncle 3–10 mm (0.12–0.39 in) long. Flowering occurs between March and May and June and August but can also occur in other months except January. The pods are oblong to narrowly oblong and papery, 20–60 mm (0.79–2.36 in) long and 5–10 mm (0.20–0.39 in) wide and orange-brown. The seeds are elliptic to egg-shaped, mostly 4–5 mm (0.16–0.20 in) long and 3–4 mm (0.12–0.16 in) wide with a small, creamy-white aril.

== Taxonomy ==
Acacia aptaneura was first formally described in 2012 by the botanists Bruce Maslin and Jordan Reid in the journal Nuytsia from specimens Maslin collected near the Paynes Find-Sandstone Road in 2008. The specific epithet (aptaneura) is taken from the Greek a- meaning without and pteron meaning wing in reference to the wingless seed pods.

== Distribution ==
Slender mulga is found in drier parts of central and western parts of Australia in Western Australia, South Australia, the Northern Territory and the outback of Queensland. In Western Australia it is found in the Carnarvon, Central Ranges, Coolgardie, Gascoyne, Gibson Desert, Great Sandy Desert, Great Victoria Desert, Hampton, Little Sandy Desert, Murchison, Nullarbor, Pilbara, Swan Coastal Plain, Tanami and Yalgoo bioregions. In the Northern Territory it occurs in the Burt Plain, Central Ranges, Davenport Murchison Ranges, Finke, Gibson Desert, Great Sandy Desert, Great Victoria Desert, Little Sandy Desert, MacDonnell Ranges, Mitchell Grass Downs, Murchison, Pilbara, Simpson Strzelecki Dunefields and Tanami bioregions. It is also found in the arid parts of South Australia and Queensland. Its occurrence in New South Wales requires further investigation. It grows in a wide range of habitats including stony or gravelly sandy loam, hardpan, on sand dunes and periodic watercourses.

== See also ==
- List of Acacia species
