= Acacia neurocarpa =

Scientific classification
- Kingdom: Plantae
- Clade: Tracheophytes
- Clade: Angiosperms
- Clade: Eudicots
- Clade: Rosids
- Order: Fabales
- Family: Fabaceae
- Subfamily: Caesalpinioideae
- Clade: Mimosoid clade
- Genus: Acacia
- Species: A. neurocarpa

Binomial name
- Acacia neurocarpa A.Cunn. ex Hook.
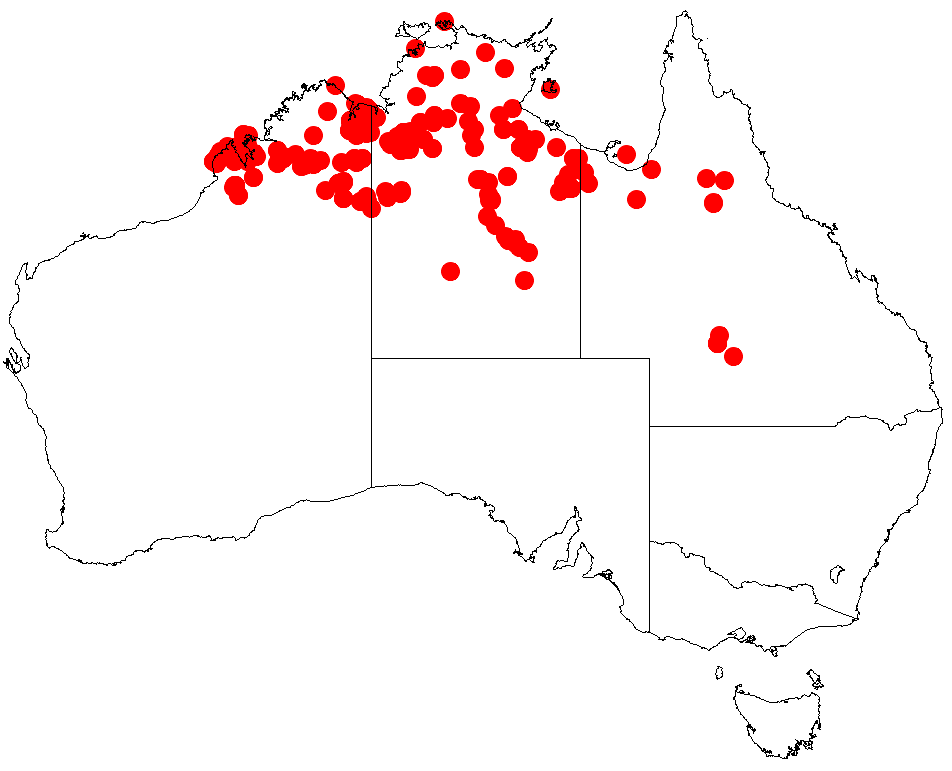
- Occurrence data from AVH

Synonyms
- Acacia holosericea var. neurocarpa (Hook.) Domin; Acacia neurocarpa A.Cunn. ex Hook. var. neurocarpa; Racosperma neurocarpum (A.Cunn. ex Hook.) Pedley

Species of legume

Acacia neurocarpa is a species of flowering plant in the family Fabaceae, and is endemic to northern Australia. It is a shrub or tree with stout, angled, hairy branchlets, ascending to erect, narrowly elliptic phyllodes, spikes of golden yellow flowers and tightly coiled, thinly leathery to crusty pods.

== Description ==
Acacia neurocarpa is a shrub or tree that typically grows to a height of 3–8 m (9.8–26.2 ft) and has stout, prominently angled, hairy branchlets and silky, silvery young shoots. Its phyllodes are ascending to erect, narrowly elliptic, 120–250 mm (4.7–9.8 in) long, 3–5.5 mm (0.12–0.22 in) wide, dull green to greyish green with normally 3 prominent veins on each side and covered with silky or velvety hairs. There is a small, stiff point on the end of the phyllodes and a gland at the base of the point and at the base of at least some phyllodes. The flowers are golden yellow and borne on spikes 40–70 mm (1.6–2.8 in) long on peduncles 4–10 mm (0.16–0.39 in) long. Flowering occurs from June to October, and the pods are tightly and often irregularly coiled, 3–4 mm (0.12–0.16 in) wide, thinly leathery to crusty, persisting as entangled clumps after the seeds have been released. The seeds are oblong, 3–5 mm (0.12–0.20 in) long, glossy dark brown to black with a bright yellow aril.

== Taxonomy ==
Acacia neurocarpa was first formally described in 1837 by William Jackson Hooker in his Icones Plantarum, from an unpublished description by Allan Cunningham of specimens he collected at Cambridge Gulf. The specific epithet (neurocarpa) means 'vein-fruited'.

== Distribution and habitat ==
This species of wattle grows in sand along seasonally wet watercourses in woodland or forest, often in association with Melaleuca species. It is common from the Dampier Peninsula in Western Australia eastwards through the Northern Territory to near Georgetown in Queensland. It occurs in the Central Kimberley, Dampierland, Northern Kimberley, Ord Victoria Plain, Tanami and Victoria Bonaparte bioregions of Western Australia and the Arnhem Coast, Burt Plain, Davenport Murchison Ranges, Gulf Coastal, Gulf Fall and Uplands, Ord Victoria Plain, Sturt Plateau, Tanami and Victoria Bonaparte bioregions of the Northern Territory.

== See also ==
- List of Acacia species
