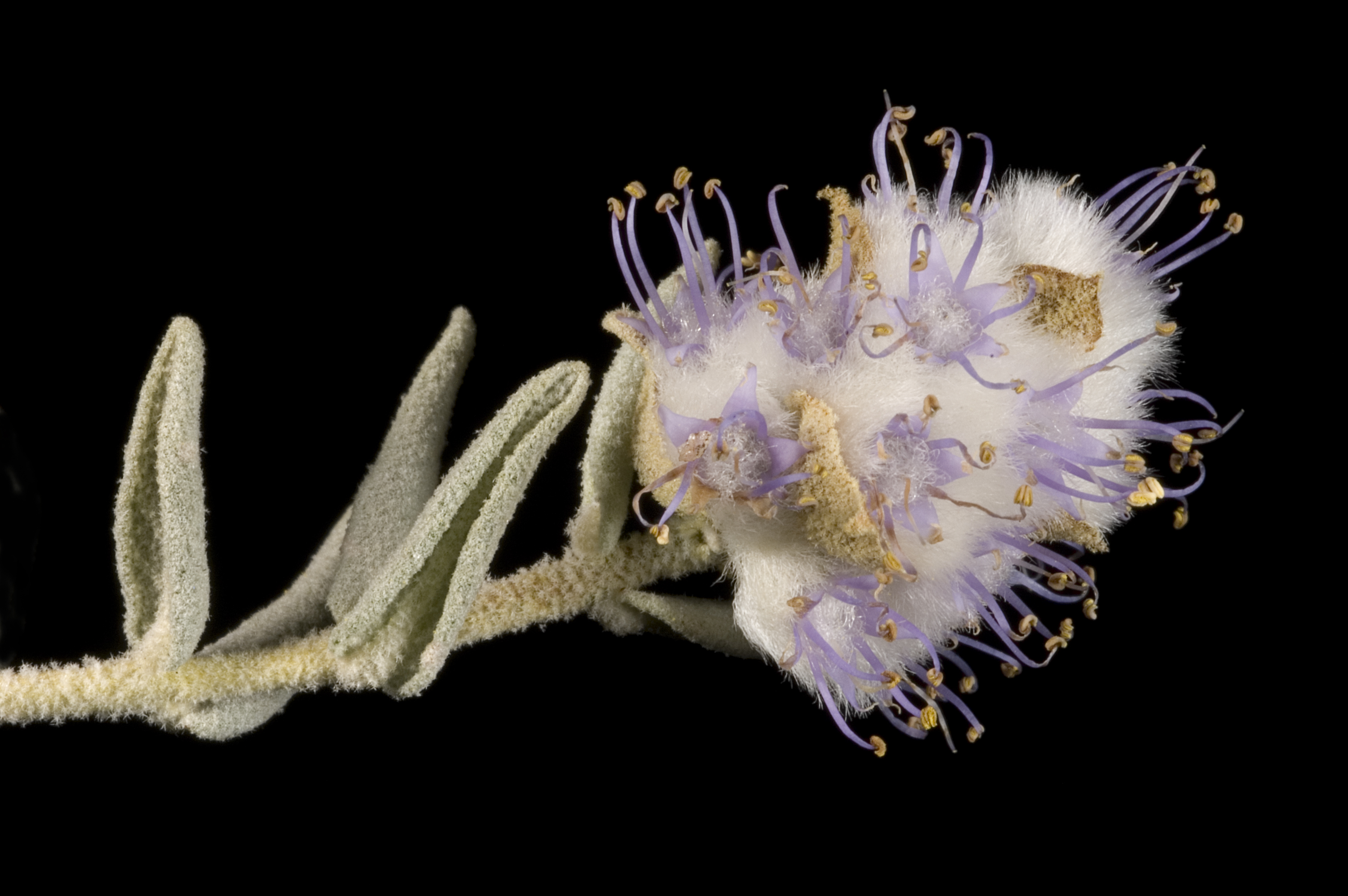

Conservation status
- Least Concern (TPWCA)

Scientific classification
- Kingdom: Plantae
- Clade: Tracheophytes
- Clade: Angiosperms
- Clade: Eudicots
- Clade: Asterids
- Order: Lamiales
- Family: Lamiaceae
- Genus: Newcastelia
- Species: N. cephalantha

Binomial name
- Newcastelia cephalantha F.Muell.
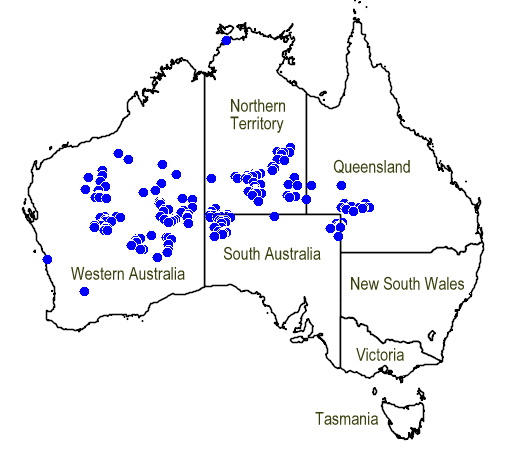
- Occurrence data from ALA

= Newcastelia cephalantha =

Species of plant

Newcastelia cephalantha is a species of plant belonging to the mint family, Lamiaceae, and native to several Australian states: Queensland, South Australia, Western Australia and the Northern Territory

== Description ==
Newcastelia cephalantha is a many branched shrub, growing from 0.3 to 1.2 m high on red sandy soils, on dunes and sandplains. It flowers from June to October with white/purple flowers.

== Distribution ==
In the Northern Territory it is found in the IBRA regions of Burt Plain, Central Ranges, Channel Country, Davenport Murchison Ranges, Finke, Great Sandy Desert, Great Victoria Desert, MacDonnell Ranges, Simpson Strzelecki Dunefields, and Tanami.

In Western Australia it is found in the IBRA regions of Pilbara, Little Sandy Desert, Gascoyne, Central Ranges, Gibson Desert, Great Sandy Desert, Great Victoria Desert and Murchison.

== Propagation ==
Take the tips from the current season's growth from actively growing plants. Transport wrapped in wet newspaper in a sealed plastic bag, and preferably refrigerated. Trim cuttings to 5–10 cm in length and dip in rooting hormone. Use intermittent mist and bottom heat. However, the strike rate is poor.
