= Burbunga albofasciata =

Scientific classification
- Kingdom: Animalia
- Phylum: Arthropoda
- Clade: Pancrustacea
- Class: Insecta
- Order: Hemiptera
- Suborder: Auchenorrhyncha
- Family: Cicadidae
- Genus: Burbunga
- Species: B. albofasciata

Binomial name
- Burbunga albofasciata Distant, 1907

Species of cicada

Burbunga albofasciata, also known as the pale spinifex cicada or pale bark cicada, is a species of cicada in the true cicada family. It is endemic to Australia. It was described in 1907 by English entomologist William Lucas Distant.

== Description ==
The species has a forewing length of 21–24 mm.

== Distribution and habitat ==
The species is found in inland northern Australia from northern Western Australia through the Northern Territory to western Queensland. The syntype was collected at Alexandria Station on the Barkly Tableland of the Northern Territory. It has been recorded from the Burt Plain, Central Ranges, Davenport Murchison Ranges, Great Sandy Desert, Mitchell Grass Downs, Sturt Plateau and Tanami bioregions. Its habitat includes grasslands, including spinifex.

== Behaviour ==
The species is a xylem feeder. Adults have been seen between August and February, when they sit on grass stems and give buzzing calls.
