= Leioproctus nudiventris =

Scientific classification
- Kingdom: Animalia
- Phylum: Arthropoda
- Clade: Pancrustacea
- Class: Insecta
- Order: Hymenoptera
- Family: Colletidae
- Genus: Leioproctus
- Species: L. nudiventris

Binomial name
- Leioproctus nudiventris Batley, 2025

Species of bee

Leioproctus nudiventris, or Leioproctus (Leioproctus) nudiventris, is a species of bee in the family Colletidae and subfamily Colletinae. It is endemic to Australia. It was described by entomologist Michael Batley in 2025.

== Etymology ==
The specific epithet nudiventris (Latin: "bare-bellied") is an anatomical reference to "the polished surface of metasomal S6 of the male".

== Description ==
The holotype male body length is 7.6 mm, head width 2.4 mm. Integumental colouration is mainly black with brown markings. The hair is mostly white.

== Distribution and habitat ==
The species occurs in eastern inland Australia. The type locality is Ledknapper Nature Reserve, near Enngonia in north-western New South Wales.

== Behaviour ==
The adults are flying mellivores. Flowering plants visited by the bees include Acacia triptera and Micromyrtus hexamera, as well as Calotis and Solanum species.

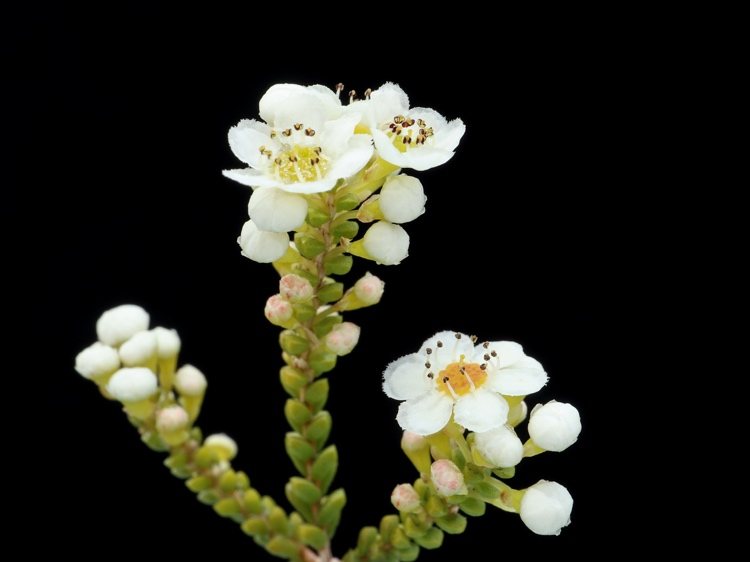
Flowers of Micromyrtus hexamera, a forage plant of the bees

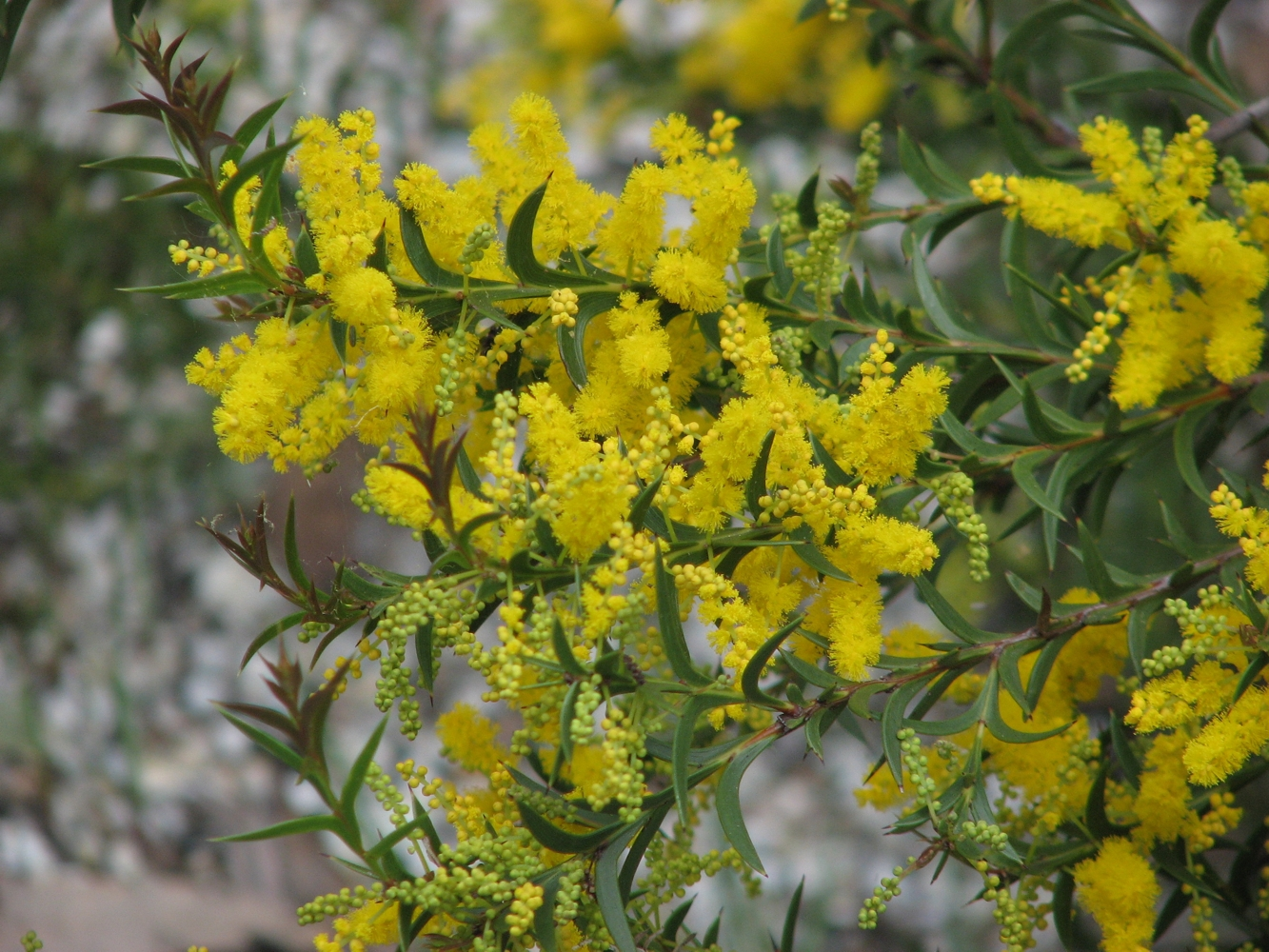
Flowers of Acacia triptera (spurwing wattle), a forage plant of the bees
