= Leioproctus gelasinatus =

Scientific classification
- Kingdom: Animalia
- Phylum: Arthropoda
- Clade: Pancrustacea
- Class: Insecta
- Order: Hymenoptera
- Family: Colletidae
- Genus: Leioproctus
- Species: L. gelasinatus

Binomial name
- Leioproctus gelasinatus Batley, 2025

Species of bee

Leioproctus gelasinatus, or Leioproctus (Leioproctus) gelasinatus, is a species of bee in the family Colletidae and subfamily Colletinae. It is endemic to Australia. It was described by entomologist Michael Batley in 2025.

== Etymology ==
The specific epithet gelasinatus (Latin: "with a dimple") is an anatomical reference to a depression in the propodeal triangle.

== Description ==
The holotype male body length is 7.8 mm, head width 2.4 mm; female body length 8.8 mm, head width 2.7 mm. Integumental colouration is mainly black with brown markings. The hair is white to brown.

== Distribution and habitat ==
The species occurs in eastern inland Australia. The type locality is 24 km west of St George in southern Queensland.

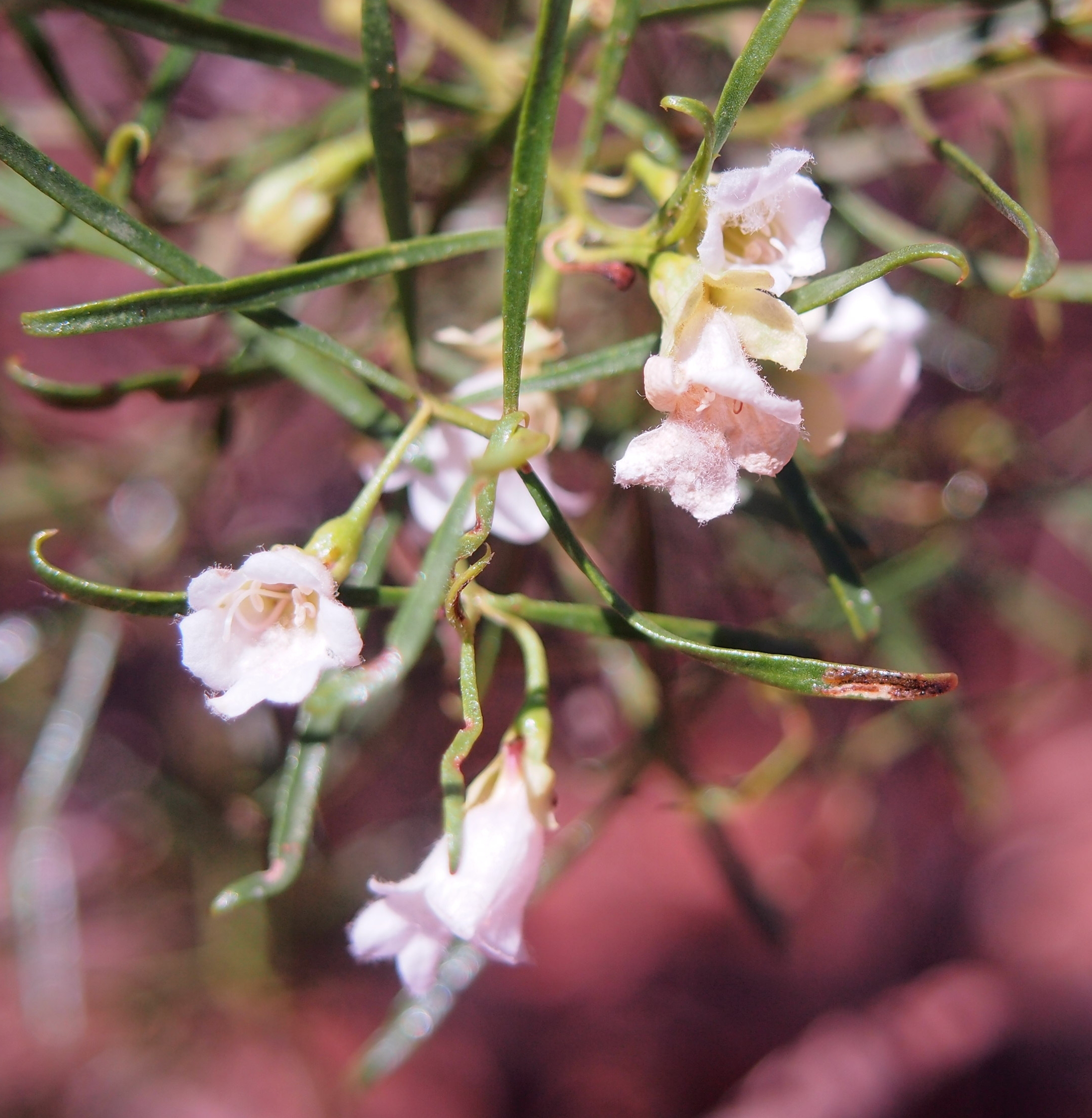
Flowers of Eremophila sturtii

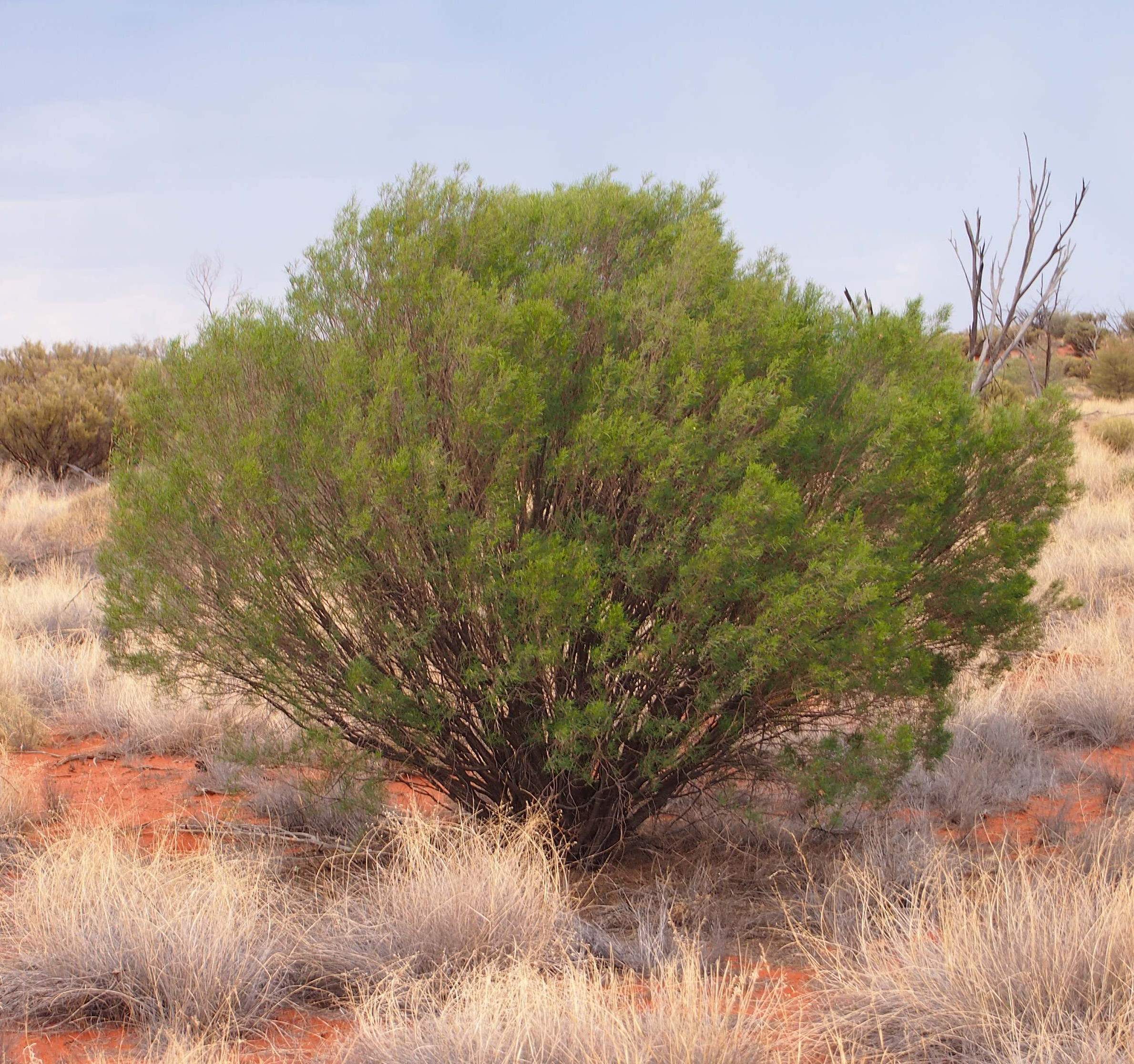
Eremophila sturtii (turpentine bush), a forage plant of the bees

== Behaviour ==
The adults are flying mellivores. Flowering plants visited by the bees include Acacia burbidgeae, Calytrix longiflora, Dianella longifolia, Eremophila sturtii, Eremophila gilesii, Micromyrtus hexamera and Newcastelia interrupta.
