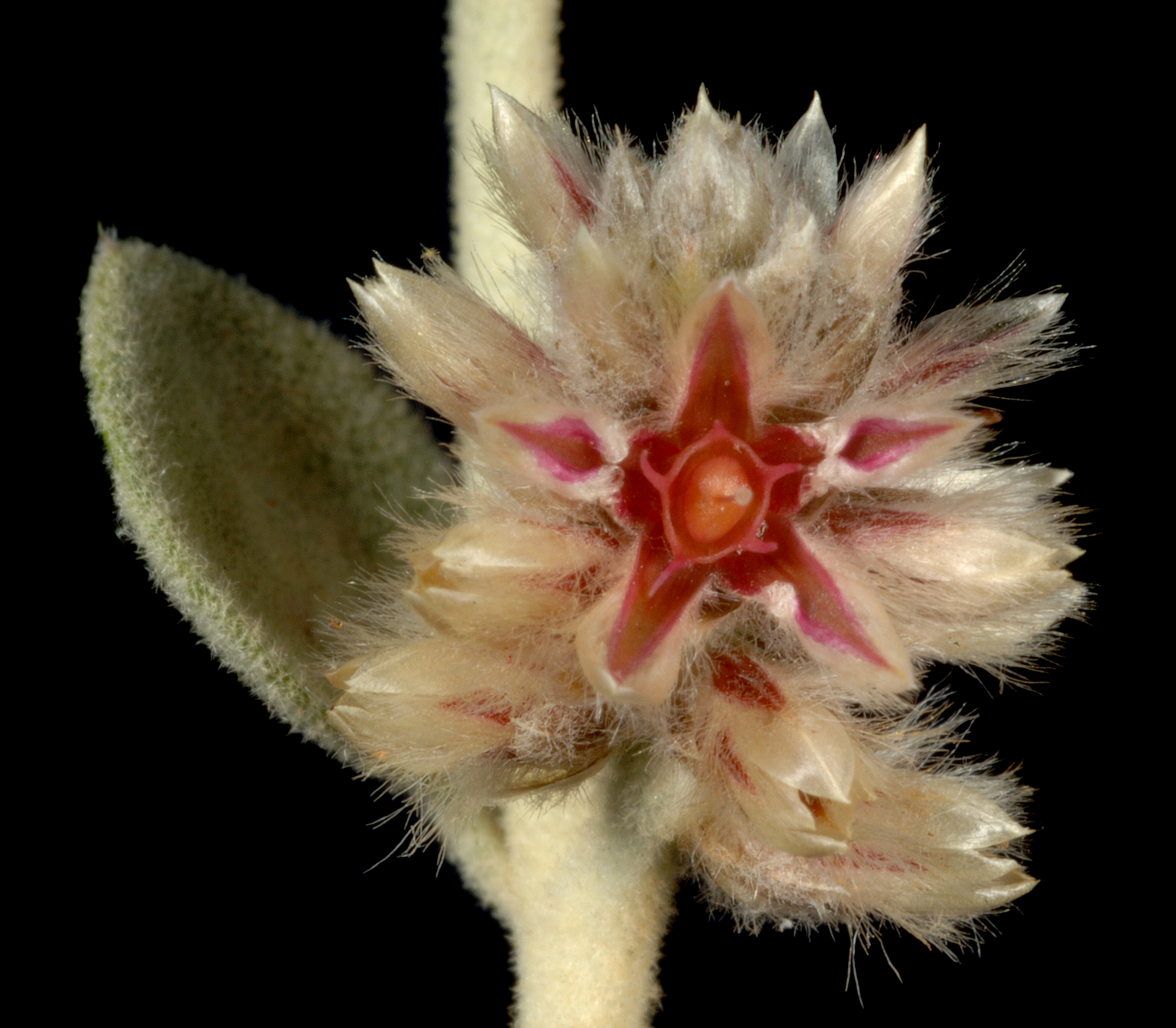

Scientific classification
- Kingdom: Plantae
- Clade: Tracheophytes
- Clade: Angiosperms
- Clade: Eudicots
- Order: Caryophyllales
- Family: Amaranthaceae
- Genus: Ptilotus
- Species: P. astrolasius

Binomial name
- Ptilotus astrolasius F.Muell.

Synonyms
- Ptilotus astrolasius F.Muell. var. astrolasius; Trichinium astrolasium (F.Muell.) F.Muell. ex Benth.

= Ptilotus astrolasius =

Species of grass-like plant

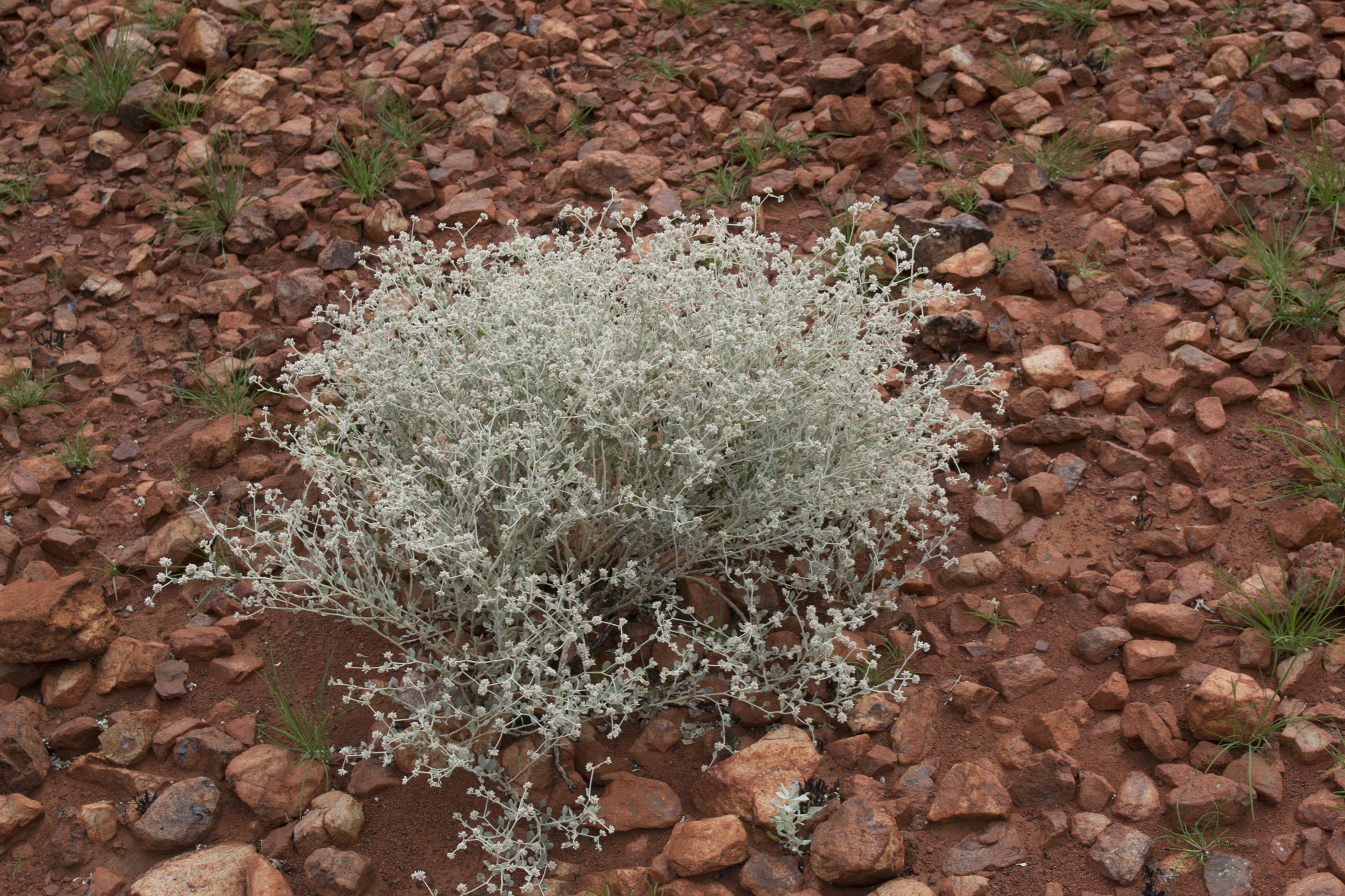
Habit near the Turner River bridge

Ptilotus astrolasius is a species of flowering plant in the family Amaranthaceae and is endemic to north-western Australia. It is a compact perennial shrub with egg-shaped leaves, sometimes with the narrower end towards the base, and spikes of greenish-white to pink or yellow flowers with five fertile stamens.

== Description ==
Ptilotus astrolasius is a compact perennial shrub that typically grows to 20–80 cm (7.9–31.5 in) high, has a single stem, and is covered star-shaped hairs. The stems have egg-shaped leaves, sometimes with the narrower end towards the base, 5–45 mm (0.20–1.77 in) long, 3–20 mm (0.12–0.79 in) wide. The flowers are greenish-white to pink or yellow and densely arranged in oval to spherical spikes 5–22 mm (0.20–0.87 in) long and 7–18 mm (0.28–0.71 in) wide. The bracts are 2.0–3.4 mm (0.079–0.134 in) long and the bracteoles 2.5–3.6 mm (0.098–0.142 in) long, hairy and colourless. The outer tepals are 4.4–5.3 mm (0.17–0.21 in) long and the inner tepals are 4.3–4.9 mm (0.17–0.19 in) long with a tuft of hairs. There are five fertile stamens and a style 1.7–3.0 mm (0.067–0.118 in) long. Flowering occurs from March to May or from July to October.

== Taxonomy ==
Ptilotus astrolasius was first formally described in 1868 by Ferdinand von Mueller in his Fragmenta Phytographiae Australiae from specimens he collected near "Sturt's Creek". The specific epithet (arthrolasius) means 'with star-shaped, woolly hairs'.

== Distribution ==
This species of Ptilotus is widespread in the Carnarvon, Central Kimberley, Dampierland, Gascoyne, Gibson Desert, Great Sandy Desert, Great Victoria Desert, Little Sandy Desert, Ord Victoria Plain, Pilbara, Tanami and Burt Plain bioregions of northern Western Australia and the Northern Territory.

== Conservation status ==
This species of Ptilotus is listed as "not threatened" by the Government of Western Australia Department of Biodiversity, Conservation and Attractions, and as of "least concern" under the Northern Territory Territory Parks and Wildlife Conservation Act.

== Gallery ==
Ptilotus astrolasius

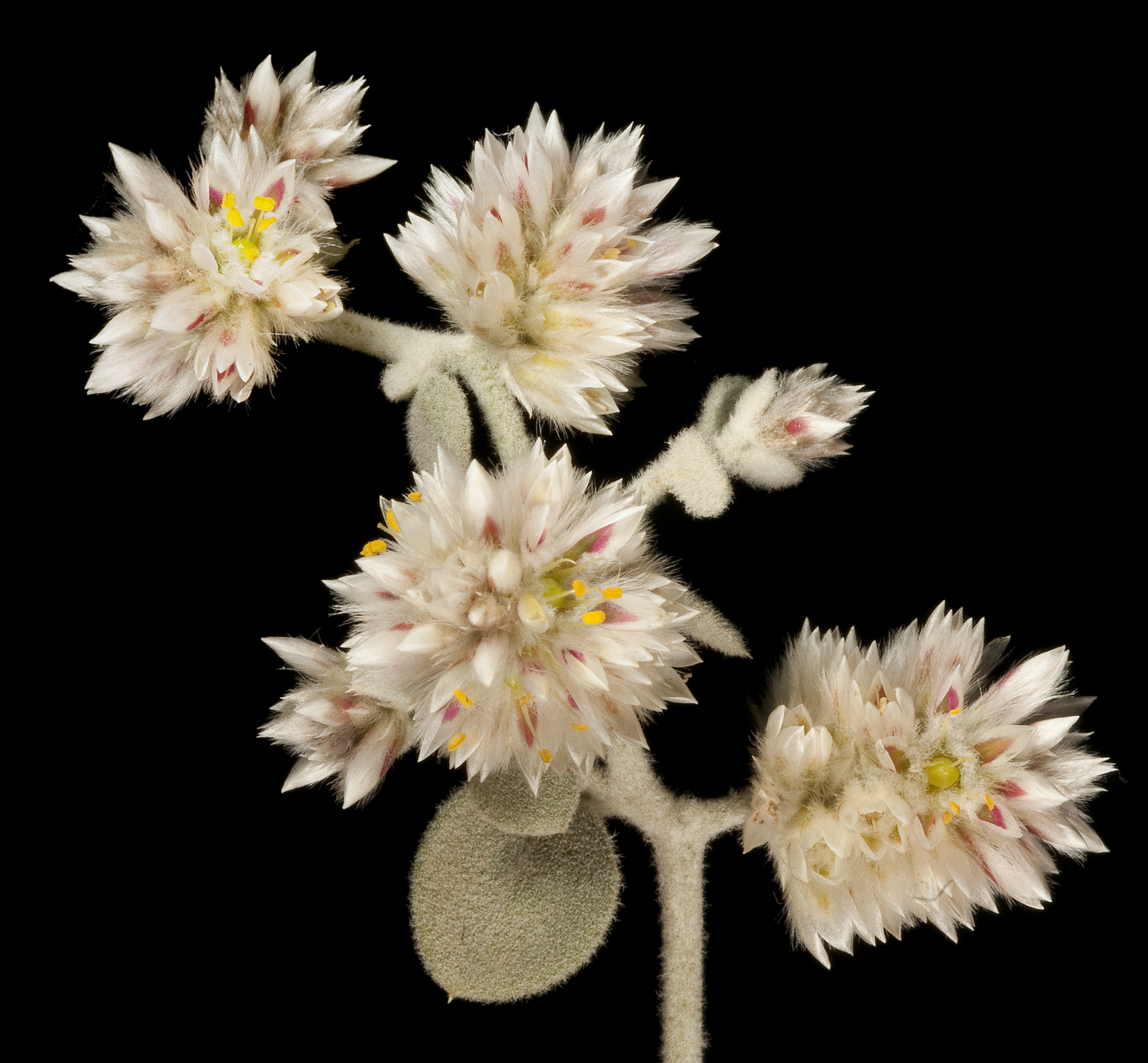

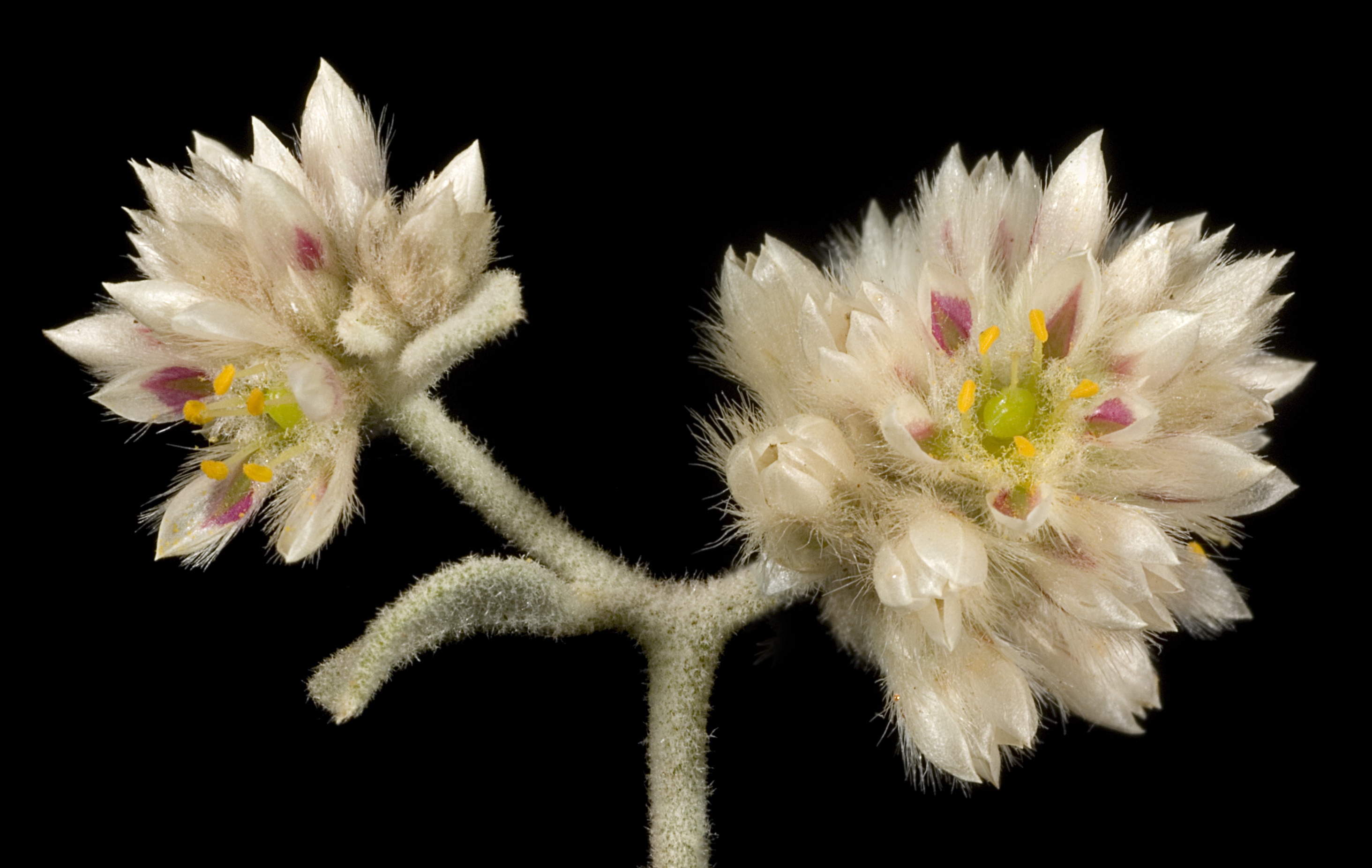

== See also ==
- List of Ptilotus species
