= Gompholobium simplicifolium =

Scientific classification
- Kingdom: Plantae
- Clade: Tracheophytes
- Clade: Angiosperms
- Clade: Eudicots
- Clade: Rosids
- Order: Fabales
- Family: Fabaceae
- Subfamily: Faboideae
- Genus: Gompholobium
- Species: G. simplicifolium

Binomial name
- Gompholobium simplicifolium (F.Muell. & Tate) Crisp

Synonyms
- Burtonia simplicifolia F.Muell. & Tate; Burtonia simplicifolia . & Tate isonym; Otion simplicifolium (F.Muell. & Tate) Crisp & P.H.Weston MS

Species of legume

Gompholobium simplicifolium is a species of flowering plant in the pea family Fabaceae and is endemic arid part of Western Australia and the Northern Territory. It is an erect or spreading shrub with cylindrical leaves and orange-yellow, pea-like flowers.

== Description ==
Gompholobium simplicifolium is an erect or spreading shrub that typically grows to a height of 0.2–1.5 m (7.9 in – 4 ft 11.1 in) and has hairy stems. The leaves are cylindrical, arranged in opposite pairs, 1.7–4.2 mm (0.067–0.165 in) long, 0.6–2 mm (0.024–0.079 in) wide and hairy. The flowers are orange-yellow, each flower on a hairy pedicel about 1 mm (0.039 in) long with hairy bracteoles 4–5 mm (0.16–0.20 in) long. The sepals are 7–10 mm (0.28–0.39 in) long, the standard petal about 8–9.5 mm (0.31–0.37 in) long, the wings 8.5–10.2 mm (0.33–0.40 in) long and the keel about 10.5 mm (0.41 in) long. Flowering occurs from May to December and the fruit is a cylindrical pod.

== Taxonomy ==
This species was first formally described in 1896 by Ferdinand von Mueller and Ralph Tate, who gave it the name Burtonia simplicifolium in Transactions, proceedings and report, Royal Society of South Australia. In 1987, Michael Crisp changed the name to Gompholobium simplicifolium. The specific epithet (simplicifolium) means "simple-leaved".

== Distribution and habitat ==
This gompholobium grows in sandy soil on dunes and sandplains in the Central Ranges, Dampierland, Gascoyne, Gibson Desert, Great Sandy Desert, Great Victoria Desert, Little Sandy Desert, Pilbara and Tanami biogeographic regions of Western Australia and the Northern Territory.

== Conservation status ==
Gompholobium shuttleworthii is classified as "not threatened" by the Government of Western Australia Department of Biodiversity, Conservation and Attractions.
