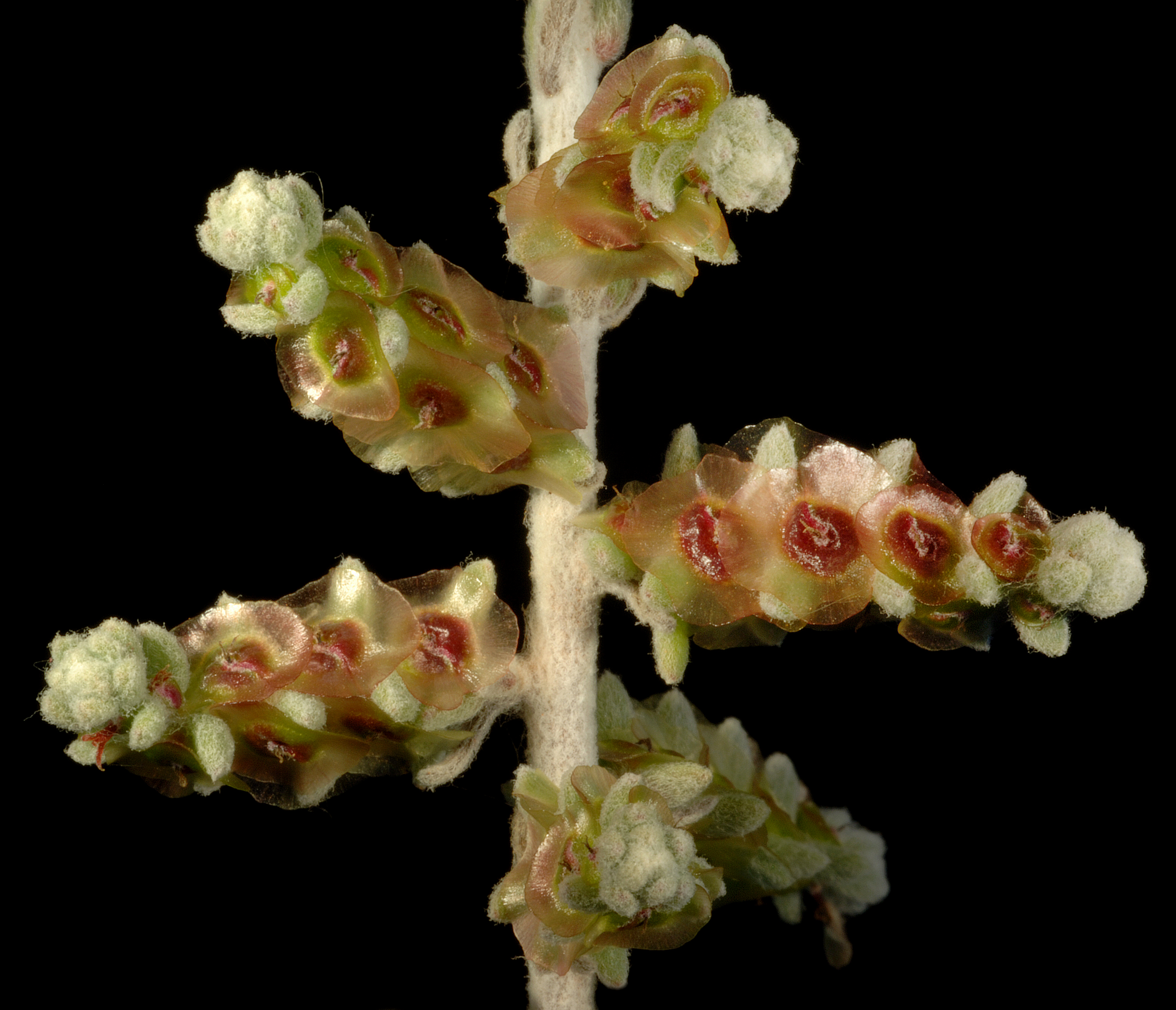

Scientific classification
- Kingdom: Plantae
- Clade: Tracheophytes
- Clade: Angiosperms
- Clade: Eudicots
- Order: Caryophyllales
- Family: Amaranthaceae
- Genus: Maireana
- Species: M. tomentosa

Binomial name
- Maireana tomentosa Moq.

= Maireana tomentosa =

Plant species

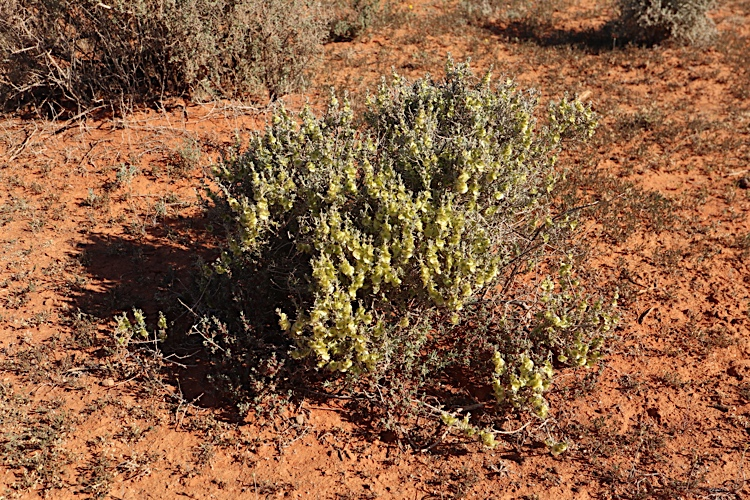
Subsp. urceolata habit in western New South Wales

Maireana tomentosa, commonly known as felty bluebush, is a plant in the Amaranthaceae family and is endemic to Australia. It is an erect, open shrub with woolly branches, semiterete leaves, flowers arranged singly and a glabrous fruiting perianth with a horizontal wing with indistinct veins.

== Description ==
Maireana tomentosa is an erect, open shrub that typically grows to a height of about 1 m (3 ft 3 in) and has woolly branches. The leaves are arranged alternately, semiterete, mostly 5–8 mm (0.20–0.31 in) long and 1 mm (0.039 in) wide. The flowers are bisexual and arranged singly, the fruiting perianth glabrous with a hemispherical or cup-shaped tube about 1.0–1.5 mm (0.039–0.059 in) high and 1.5–2.5 mm (0.059–0.098 in) in diameter with a simple, horizontal wing mostly 8–11 mm (0.31–0.43 in) in diameter with indistinct veins and without a radial slit. The upper perianth is flat or raised to form a hard, ring-shaped disc.

== Taxonomy ==
Maireana tomentosa was first formally described in 1840 by Alfred Moquin-Tandon in his Chenopodearum Monographica Enumeratio from specimens collected near Shark Bay. The specific epithet (tomentosa) means 'tomentose, referring to dense, short, matted hairs.

In 1975, Paul G. Wilson described two subspecies of M. tomentosa in the journal Nuytsia and the names are accepted by the Australian Plant Census:

- Maireana tomentosa Moq. subsp. tomentosa has a perianth with a cup-shaped, woody glossy tube.
- Maireana tomentosa subsp. urceolata Paul G.Wilson has a perianth with a dull, thickly crusty hemispherical tube.

== Distribution and habitat ==
Felty bluebush is widespread in Western Australia south of 20° south, southern Northern Territory, northern South Australia and north-western New South Wales.

- Subspecies tomentosa only occurs in Western Australia and the Northern Territory, where it mainly grows on rocky or gravelly ranges, breakaways, hills or rises in the Burt Plain, Central Ranges, Finke, Great Sandy Desert, Great Victoria Desert, MacDonnell Ranges and Simpson Strzelecki Dunefields bioregions of southern Northern Territory.
- Subspecies urceolata only occurs in South Australia and New South Wales where it is uncommonly found in the far north-western plains.

== Conservation status ==
Maireana tomentosa is listed as "not threatened" by the Government of Western Australia Department of Biodiversity, Conservation and Attractions.
