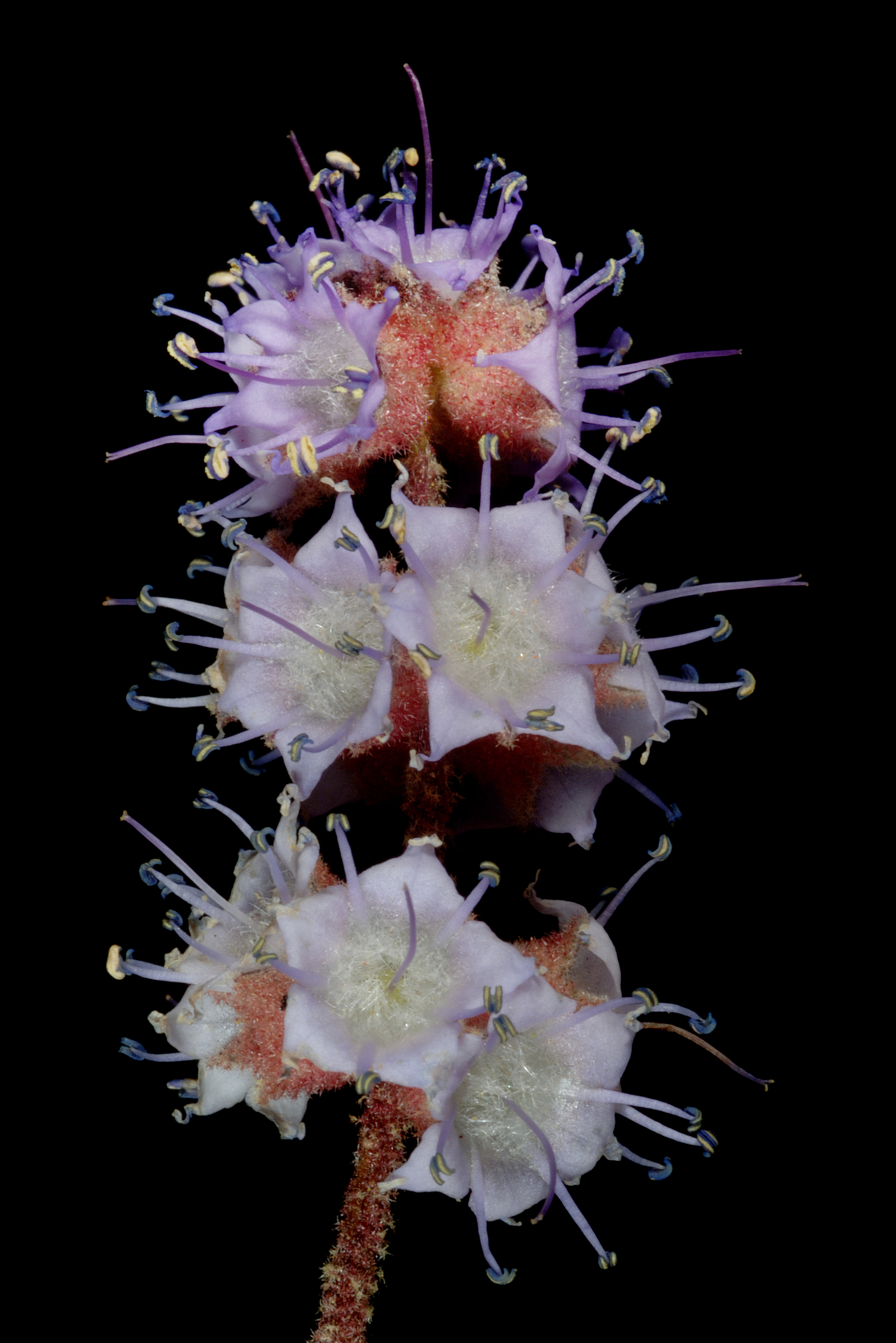

Scientific classification
- Kingdom: Plantae
- Clade: Tracheophytes
- Clade: Angiosperms
- Clade: Eudicots
- Clade: Asterids
- Order: Lamiales
- Family: Lamiaceae
- Genus: Newcastelia
- Species: N. roseoazurea

Binomial name
- Newcastelia roseoazurea Rye
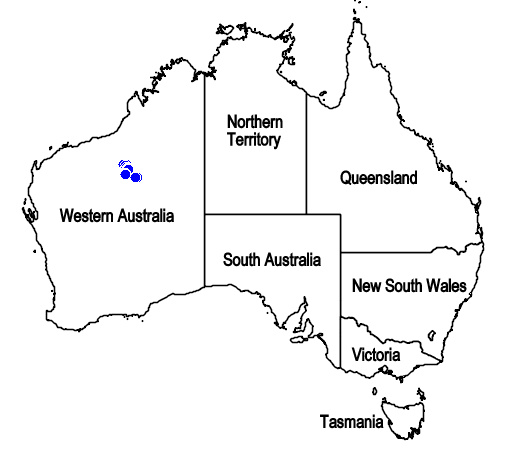
- Occurrence data

= Newcastelia roseoazurea =

Species of flowering plant

Newcastelia roseoazurea is a species of plant belonging to the mint family, Lamiaceae, and native to Western Australia.

== Description ==
Newcastelia roseoazurea is a rounded, spreading shrub, growing from 0.3 to 1 m high. Its purple-blue/red-yellow flowerheads may be seen from July to September. It grows on sands and silty flats.

In Western Australia it is found in the IBRA regions of the Great Sandy Desert and the Little Sandy Desert.

It was first described in 1996 by Barbara Rye.
