= Burbunga occidentalis =

Scientific classification
- Kingdom: Animalia
- Phylum: Arthropoda
- Clade: Pancrustacea
- Class: Insecta
- Order: Hemiptera
- Suborder: Auchenorrhyncha
- Family: Cicadidae
- Genus: Burbunga
- Species: B. occidentalis

Binomial name
- Burbunga occidentalis (Distant, 1912)

Synonyms
- Macrotristria occidentalis Distant, W.L. 1912

Species of cicada

Burbunga occidentalis, also known as the south-western whiner, is a species of cicada in the true cicada family. It is endemic to Australia. It was described in 1912 by English entomologist William Lucas Distant.

== Description ==
The species has a forewing length of 35–41 mm.

== Distribution and habitat ==
The syntype was collected in the vicinity of Southern Cross, some 370 km east of Perth. The species has been recorded from the Avon Wheatbelt, Esperance Plains, Geraldton Sandplains, Jarrah Forest, Mallee, Swan Coastal Plain, Warren and Yalgoo bioregions. It is found in low woodland and open heath habitats.

== Behaviour ==
Adults are heard from November to January, clinging to the branches of trees and shrubs, uttering strong, continuous buzzing calls.
