= Burbunga aterrima =

Scientific classification
- Kingdom: Animalia
- Phylum: Arthropoda
- Clade: Pancrustacea
- Class: Insecta
- Order: Hemiptera
- Suborder: Auchenorrhyncha
- Family: Cicadidae
- Genus: Burbunga
- Species: B. aterrima

Binomial name
- Burbunga aterrima Distant, 1914

Synonyms
- Macrotristria aterrima (Distant, 1914)

Species of cicada

Burbunga aterrima, also known as the western screamer, is a species of cicada in the true cicada family. It is endemic to Australia. It was described in 1914 by English entomologist William Lucas Distant.

== Description ==
The species has a forewing length of 31–42 mm.

== Distribution and habitat ==
The species is found in central-western Western Australia. The syntype was collected at Cue. It has been recorded in scrubland habitats along the coast from the vicinity of Karratha southwards to Shark Bay, and inland to Yalgoo and Lake Austin.

== Behaviour ==
Adults have been seen in February, when they sit on the branches of shrubs and small trees, and give strong buzzing calls.
