= Burbunga gilmorei =

Scientific classification
- Kingdom: Animalia
- Phylum: Arthropoda
- Clade: Pancrustacea
- Class: Insecta
- Order: Hemiptera
- Suborder: Auchenorrhyncha
- Family: Cicadidae
- Genus: Burbunga
- Species: B. gilmorei

Binomial name
- Burbunga gilmorei (Distant, 1882)

Synonyms
- Tibicen gilmorei Distant, 1882

Species of cicada

Burbunga gilmorei, also known as the western bark cicada, is a species of cicada in the true cicada family. It is endemic to Australia. It was described in 1882 by English entomologist William Lucas Distant.

== Description ==
The species has a forewing length of 23–28 mm.

== Distribution and habitat ==
The lectotype was collected in the vicinity of the Swan River and Perth in Western Australia, with isolated populations recorded at Uluru in the Northern Territory and near Tarcoola in South Australia. The species is found in mallee woodland habitats.

Other notable areas include Yellowdine and Leinster.

== Behaviour ==
Adults are seen from December to March, when they cling to the branches and trunks of mallee eucalypts, and utter monotonous buzzing calls.
