= Burbunga nanda =

Scientific classification
- Kingdom: Animalia
- Phylum: Arthropoda
- Clade: Pancrustacea
- Class: Insecta
- Order: Hemiptera
- Suborder: Auchenorrhyncha
- Family: Cicadidae
- Genus: Burbunga
- Species: B. nanda

Binomial name
- Burbunga nanda (Burns, 1964)

Synonyms
- Macrotristria nanda Burns, 1964

Species of cicada

Burbunga nanda, also known as the charcoal screamer, is a species of cicada in the true cicada family. It is endemic to Australia. It was described in 1964 by Australian entomologist Alexander Noble Burns.

== Description ==
The species has a forewing length of 42–58 mm.

== Distribution and habitat ==
The holotype was collected in the Murchison River district of Western Australia. The species occurs in the Avon Wheatbelt, Coolgardie, Central Ranges, Dampierland, Esperance Plains, Gibson Desert, Geraldton Sandplains, Great Sandy Desert, Great Victoria Desert, Hampton, Jarrah Forest, Little Sandy Desert, Mallee, Murchison, Nullarbor, Swan Coastal Plain, Tanami, Warren and Yalgoo bioregions. It is found in open woodland and Acacia heath habitats.

== Behaviour ==
Adults are heard in February and early March, clinging to the branches of trees and shrubs, uttering continuous loud buzzing calls.
