= Burbunga =

Scientific classification
- Kingdom: Animalia
- Phylum: Arthropoda
- Clade: Pancrustacea
- Class: Insecta
- Order: Hemiptera
- Suborder: Auchenorrhyncha
- Superfamily: Cicadoidea
- Family: Cicadidae
- Subfamily: Cicadinae
- Tribe: Burbungini
- Genus: Burbunga; Distant, 1905

Genus of true bugs

Burbunga is a genus of cicadas, commonly known as bark cicadas or screamers, in the family Cicadidae, found in Australia. Burbunga is the only genus of the tribe Burbungini.

== Species ==
There are 11 species in the genus:

- Burbunga albofasciata Distant, 1907
- Burbunga aterrima Distant, 1914
- Burbunga gilmorei (Distant, 1882)
- Burbunga hillieri (Distant, 1907)
- Burbunga inornata Distant, 1905
- Burbunga mouldsi Olive, 2012
- Burbunga nanda (Burns, 1964)
- Burbunga nigrosignata (Distant, 1904)
- Burbunga occidentalis (Distant, 1912)
- Burbunga parva Moulds, 1994
- Burbunga queenslandica Moulds, 1994
