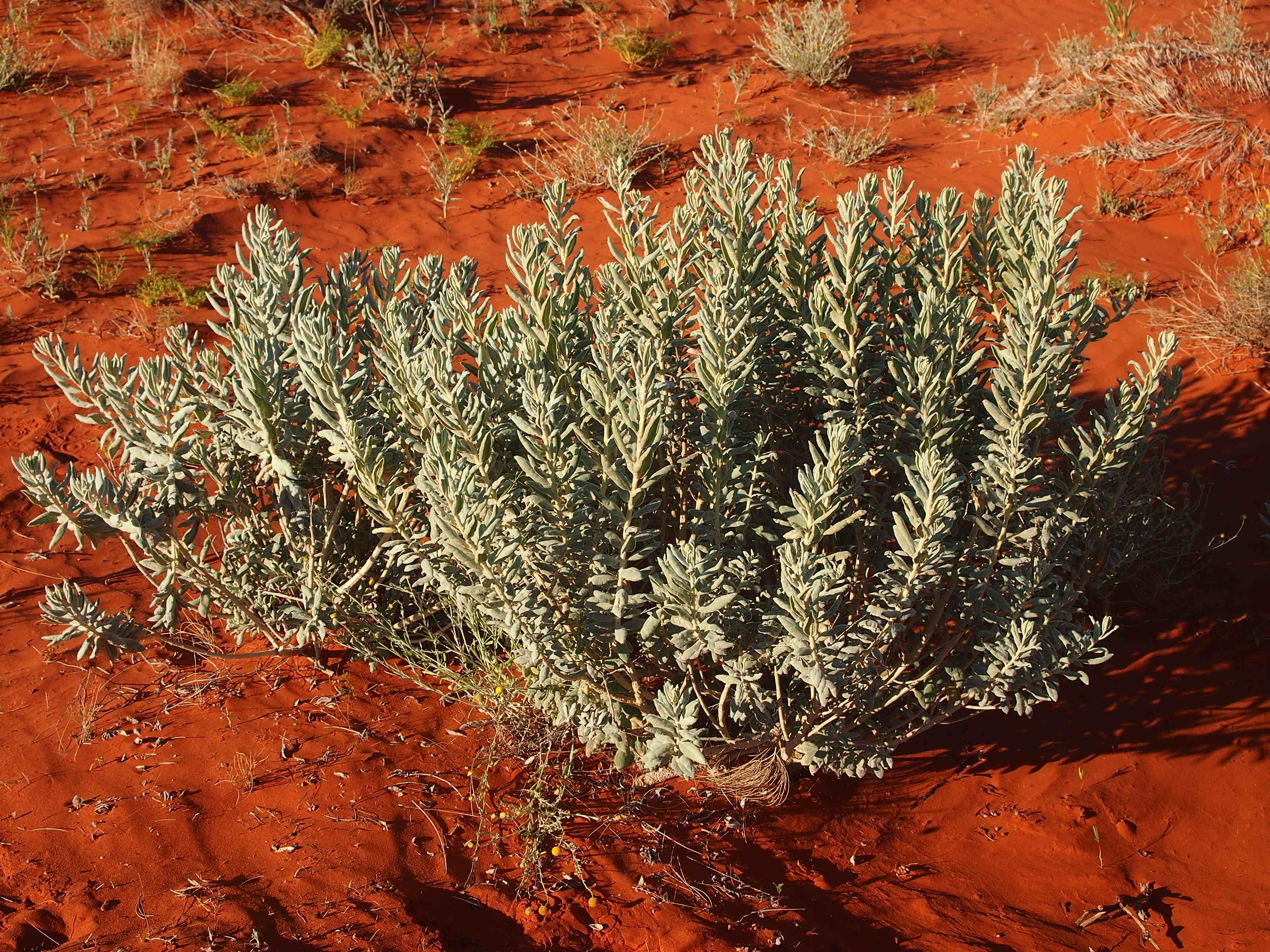
- Newcastelia spodiotricha

Scientific classification
- Kingdom: Plantae
- Clade: Tracheophytes
- Clade: Angiosperms
- Clade: Eudicots
- Clade: Asterids
- Order: Lamiales
- Family: Lamiaceae
- Subfamily: Prostantheroideae
- Genus: Newcastelia; F.Muell.

= Newcastelia =

Genus of flowering plants

Newcastelia is a genus of flowering plants in the mint family, Lamiaceae, first described in 1857 by Ferdinand von Mueller, who placed it in the family, Verbenaceae. The entire genus is endemic to Australia.

Species

- Newcastelia bracteosa F.Muell. - Western Australia, South Australia, Northern Territory
- Newcastelia cephalantha F.Muell. - Western Australia, South Australia, Northern Territory, Queensland
- Newcastelia cladotricha F.Muell. - Western Australia, Northern Territory
- Newcastelia elliptica Munir - Western Australia, Northern Territory
- Newcastelia hexarrhena F.Muell. - Western Australia
- Newcastelia insignis E.Pritz. - Western Australia
- Newcastelia interrupta Munir - Queensland
- Newcastelia roseoazurea Rye - Western Australia
- Newcastelia spodiotricha F.Muell. - Western Australia, South Australia, Northern Territory
- Newcastelia velutina Munir - Queensland

== Gallery ==
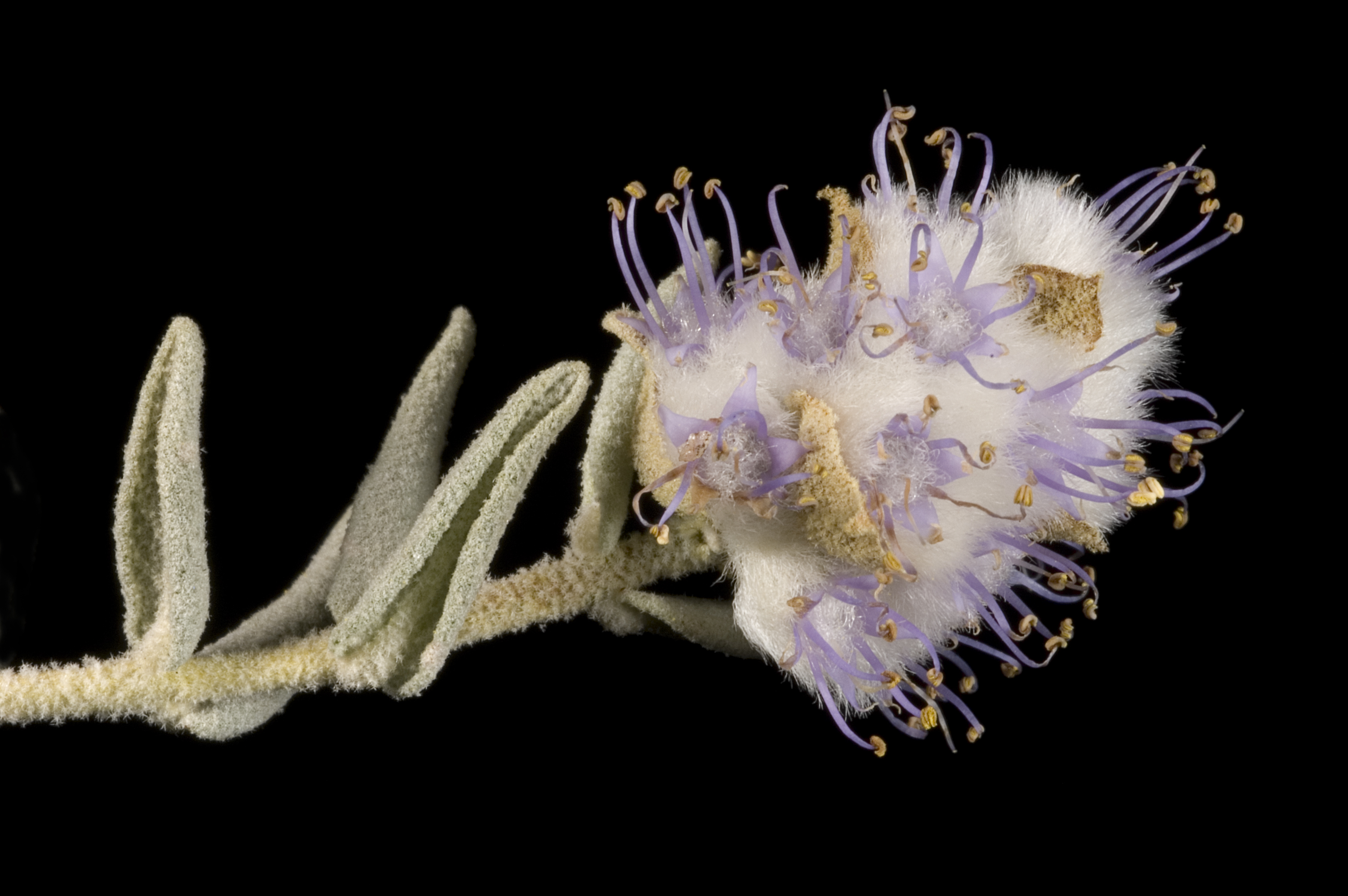
N. cephalantha flower

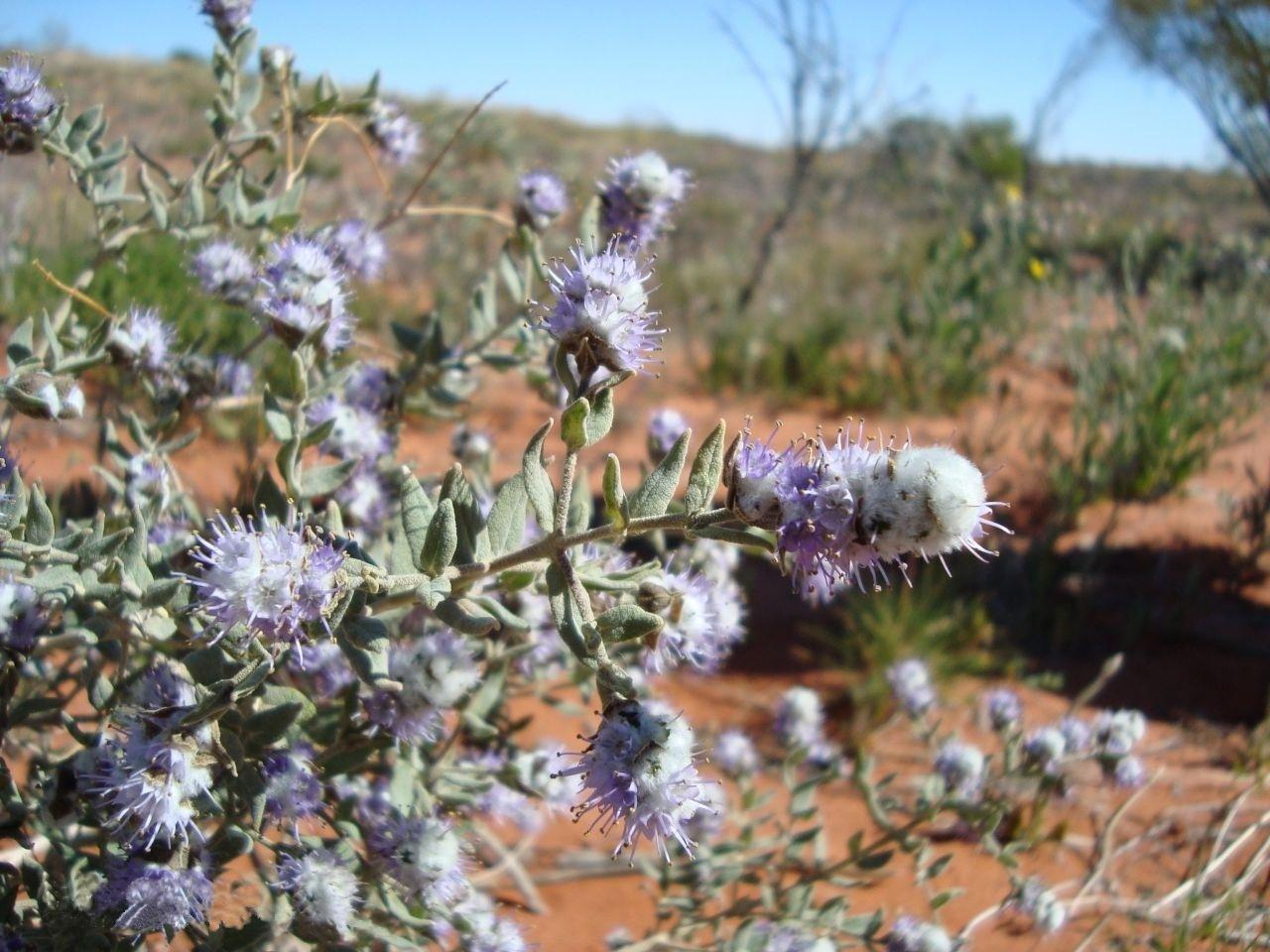
N. cephalantha

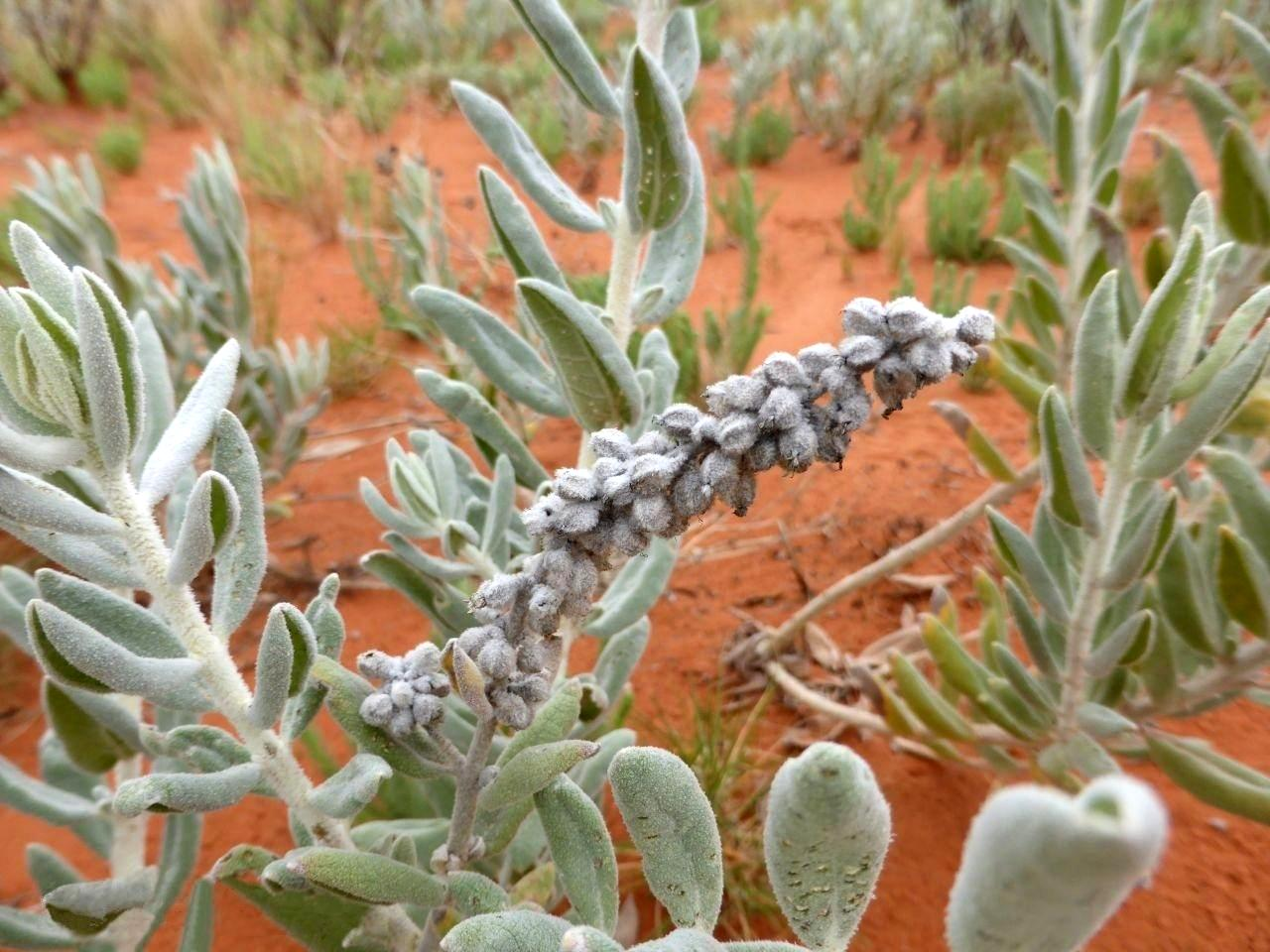
N.spodiotricha seed heads

== See also ==
- Rye, B. L. (1996) A taxonomic review of the genera Lachnostachys, Newcastelia and Physopsis (Chloanthaceae) in Western Australia
- Wheeler, J. R.; Rye, B. L.; Koch, B. L.; Wilson, A. J. G.; Western Australian Herbarium (1992). Flora of the Kimberley region. Western Australian Herbarium. Como, W.A.
- Blackall, William E.; Grieve, Brian J. (1981). How to know Western Australian wildflowers : a key to the flora of the extratropical regions of Western Australia. Part IIIB, (Epacridaceae-Lamiaceae). University of W.A. Press. Perth.
