= Burbunga queenslandica =

Scientific classification
- Kingdom: Animalia
- Phylum: Arthropoda
- Clade: Pancrustacea
- Class: Insecta
- Order: Hemiptera
- Suborder: Auchenorrhyncha
- Family: Cicadidae
- Genus: Burbunga
- Species: B. queenslandica

Binomial name
- Burbunga queenslandica Moulds, 1994)

Species of cicada

Burbunga queenslandica, also known as the Queensland bark cicada, is a species of cicada in the true cicada family. It is endemic to Australia. It was described in 1994 by Australian entomologist Maxwell Sydney Moulds.

== Description ==
The species has a forewing length of 20–26 mm.

== Distribution and habitat ==
The species occurs from Mount Garnet in the Tablelands Region of northern Queensland, southwards to Broke in the Hunter Region of New South Wales, where it occurs in open woodland habitats, especially in ironbark and box eucalypt communities.

== Behaviour ==
Adults may be heard from October to March at any time of day, sitting in the bark furrows of ironbark trees, uttering monotonous, clean buzzing calls.
