= Burbunga inornata =

Scientific classification
- Kingdom: Animalia
- Phylum: Arthropoda
- Clade: Pancrustacea
- Class: Insecta
- Order: Hemiptera
- Suborder: Auchenorrhyncha
- Family: Cicadidae
- Genus: Burbunga
- Species: B. inornata

Binomial name
- Burbunga inornata Distant, 1905

Species of cicada

Burbunga inornata, also known as the western screamer, is a species of cicada in the true cicada family. It is endemic to Australia. It was described in 1905 by English entomologist William Lucas Distant.

== Description ==
The species has a forewing length of 19–25 mm.

== Distribution and habitat ==
The syntype was collected in the vicinity of Geraldton in the Mid West region of Western Australia. The species has been recorded from the Carnarvon, Gascoyne, Geraldton Sandplains, Murchison, Pilbara and Yalgoo bioregions. It is found in low scrubland habitats.

== Behaviour ==
The species is a xylem feeder. Adults have been heard in February, clinging to the branches of desert shrubs and uttering buzzing calls.
