= Burbunga parva =

Scientific classification
- Kingdom: Animalia
- Phylum: Arthropoda
- Clade: Pancrustacea
- Class: Insecta
- Order: Hemiptera
- Suborder: Auchenorrhyncha
- Family: Cicadidae
- Genus: Burbunga
- Species: B. parva

Binomial name
- Burbunga parva Moulds, 1994)

Species of cicada

Burbunga parva, also known as the small northern bark cicada, is a species of cicada in the true cicada family. It is endemic to Australia. It was described in 1994 by Australian entomologist Maxwell Sydney Moulds.

== Description ==
The species has a forewing length of 28–31 mm.

== Distribution and habitat ==
The species occurs in the Katherine and Dunmarra districts of the Northern Territory, where it occurs in open eucalypt woodland habitats.

== Behaviour ==
Adults may be heard in November and December, clinging to the trunks and branches of eucalypts, uttering continuous, moderately pitched, buzzing calls.
