= Burbunga mouldsi =

Scientific classification
- Kingdom: Animalia
- Phylum: Arthropoda
- Clade: Pancrustacea
- Class: Insecta
- Order: Hemiptera
- Suborder: Auchenorrhyncha
- Family: Cicadidae
- Genus: Burbunga
- Species: B. mouldsi

Binomial name
- Burbunga mouldsi Olive, 2012

Species of cicada

Burbunga mouldsi, also known as the Mareeba bark cicada, is a species of cicada in the true cicada family. It is endemic to Australia. It was described in 2012 by Australian entomologist J.C. Olive.

== Etymology ==
The specific epithet honours Australian entomologist Maxwell Sydney Moulds for his lifetime study of Australian cicadas and cicada taxonomy.

== Description ==
The species has a forewing length of 18–24 mm.

== Distribution and habitat ==
The species is found in the wet tropics of north-eastern Queensland from Mount Carbine southwards to the vicinity of Dimbulah and Walkamin, where it occurs in open woodland habitats with an understorey of sparse shrubs and grass.

== Behaviour ==
Adults may be heard from late September to January, clinging to grass stems and small shrubs, uttering continuous high-pitched buzzing calls.
