= Burbunga hillieri =

Scientific classification
- Kingdom: Animalia
- Phylum: Arthropoda
- Clade: Pancrustacea
- Class: Insecta
- Order: Hemiptera
- Suborder: Auchenorrhyncha
- Family: Cicadidae
- Genus: Burbunga
- Species: B. hillieri

Binomial name
- Burbunga hillieri (Distant, 1907)

Synonyms
- Macrotristria hillieri Distant, 1907

Species of cicada

Burbunga hillieri, also known as the desert screamer, is a species of cicada in the true cicada family. It is endemic to Australia. It was described in 1907 by English entomologist William Lucas Distant.

== Description ==
The species has a forewing length of 41–49 mm. It is cryptically coloured for sitting on bark.

== Distribution and habitat ==
The syntype was collected in the vicinity of Hermannsburg in the southern Northern Territory west of Alice Springs. The species is found across much of arid inland Australia and has been recorded from all mainland states as well as the Northern Territory. It inhabits Acacia scrubland, including gidgee, mulga and ironwood communities, as well as small shrubs in desert habitats.

== Behaviour ==
Adults are heard from September to March, when they utter loud, continuous, buzzing calls during the heat of the day and at dusk.
