= Burbunga nigrosignata =

Scientific classification
- Kingdom: Animalia
- Phylum: Arthropoda
- Clade: Pancrustacea
- Class: Insecta
- Order: Hemiptera
- Suborder: Auchenorrhyncha
- Family: Cicadidae
- Genus: Burbunga
- Species: B. nigrosignata

Binomial name
- Burbunga nigrosignata (Distant, 1904)

Synonyms
- Macrotristria nigrosignata Distant, 1904

Species of cicada

Burbunga nigrosignata, also known as the floury bark cicada, is a species of cicada in the true cicada family. It is endemic to Australia. It was described in 1904 by English entomologist William Lucas Distant.

== Description ==
The species has a forewing length of 42–58 mm.

== Distribution and habitat ==
The syntype was collected in the vicinity of Cossack in the Pilbara region of Western Australia, some 1500 km north of Perth. The species has been recorded from the Carnarvon, Gascoyne, Geraldton Sandplains, Murchison, Pilbara and Yalgoo bioregions. It is found in low open scrubland habitats.

== Behaviour ==
Adults have been heard in February, clinging to the branches of trees and shrubs, uttering loud buzzing calls.
