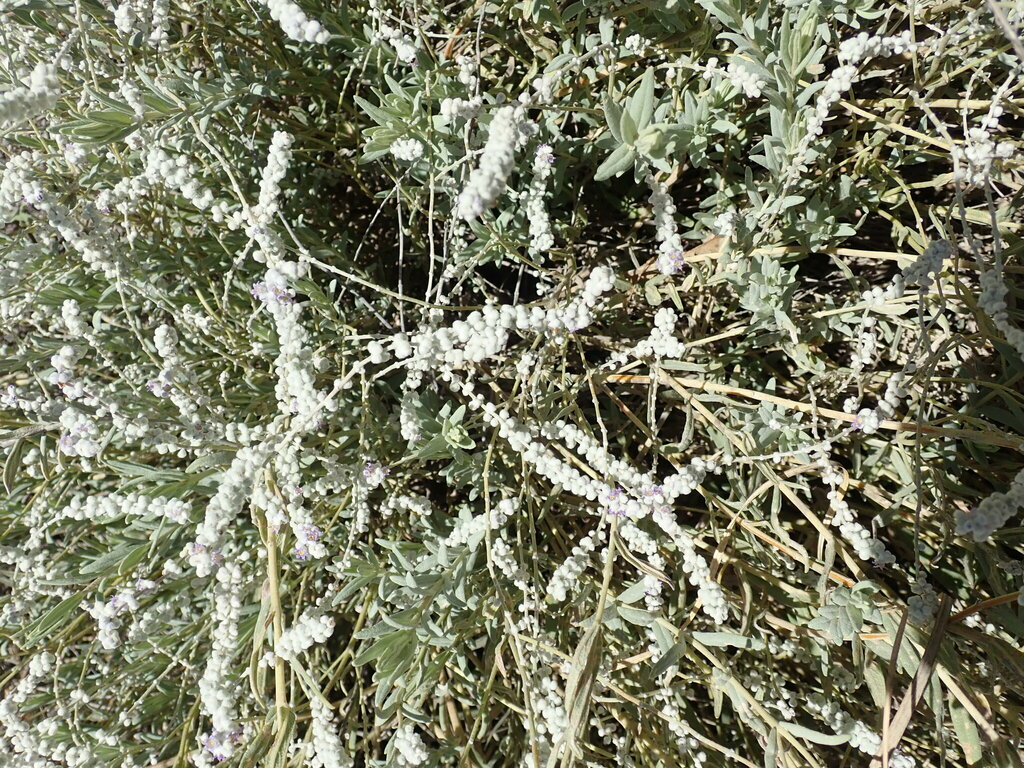

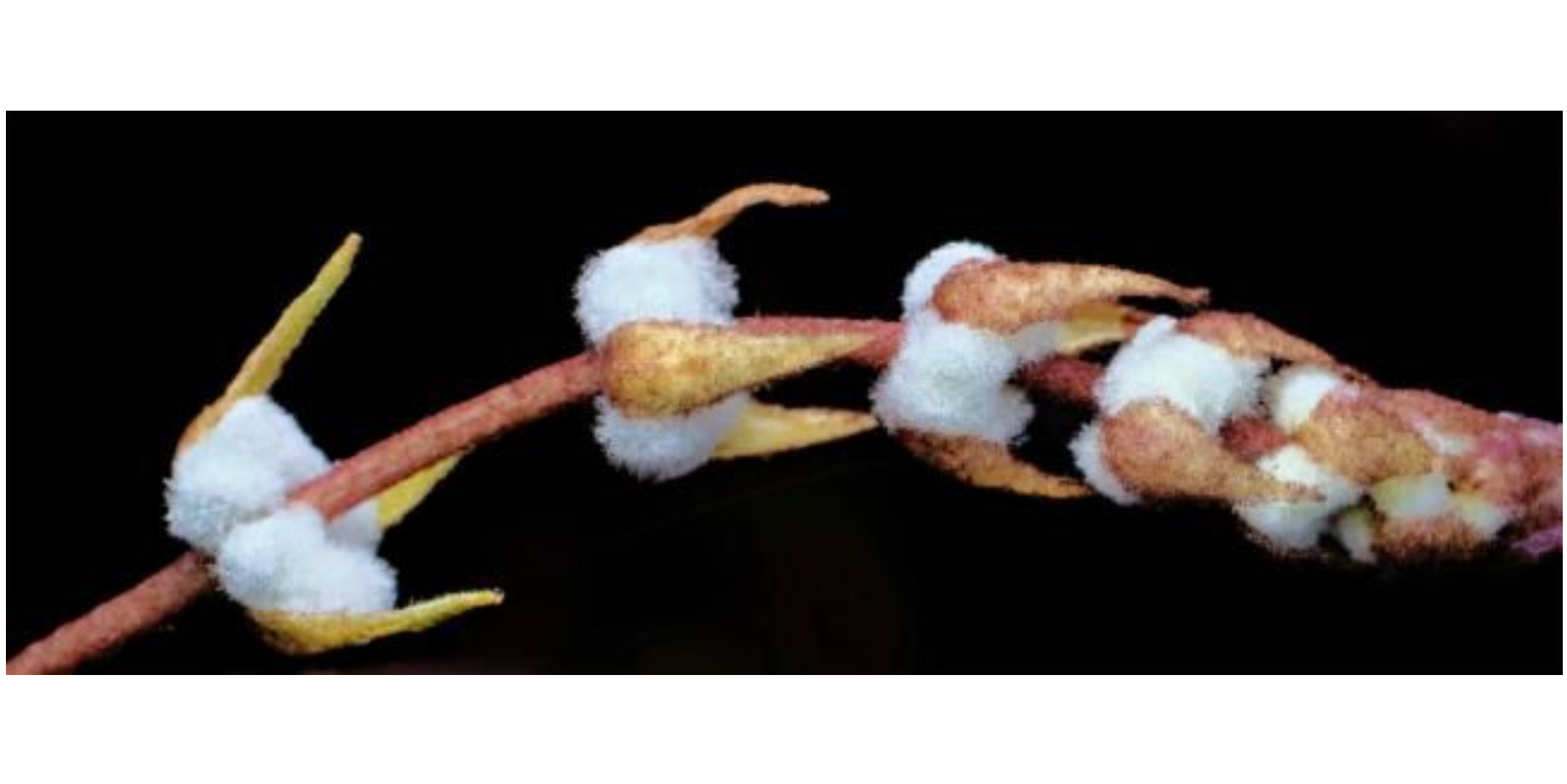
- Newcastelia interrupta - buds

Scientific classification
- Kingdom: Plantae
- Clade: Tracheophytes
- Clade: Angiosperms
- Clade: Eudicots
- Clade: Asterids
- Order: Lamiales
- Family: Lamiaceae
- Genus: Newcastelia
- Species: N. interrupta

Binomial name
- Newcastelia interrupta Munir
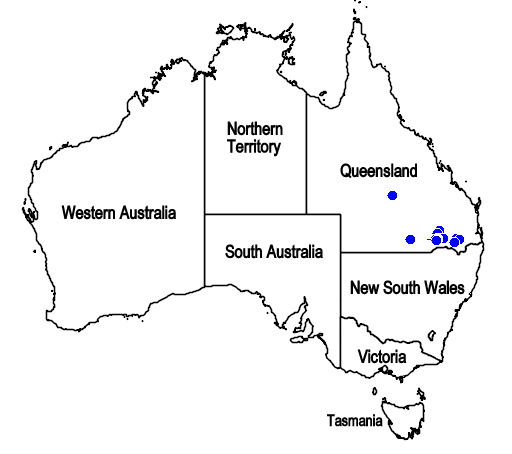
- Occurrence data

= Newcastelia interrupta =

Species of flowering plant

Newcastelia interrupta is a species of plant belonging to the mint family, Lamiaceae, and is native to Queensland.

It was first described in 1978 by Ahmad Abid Munir.
