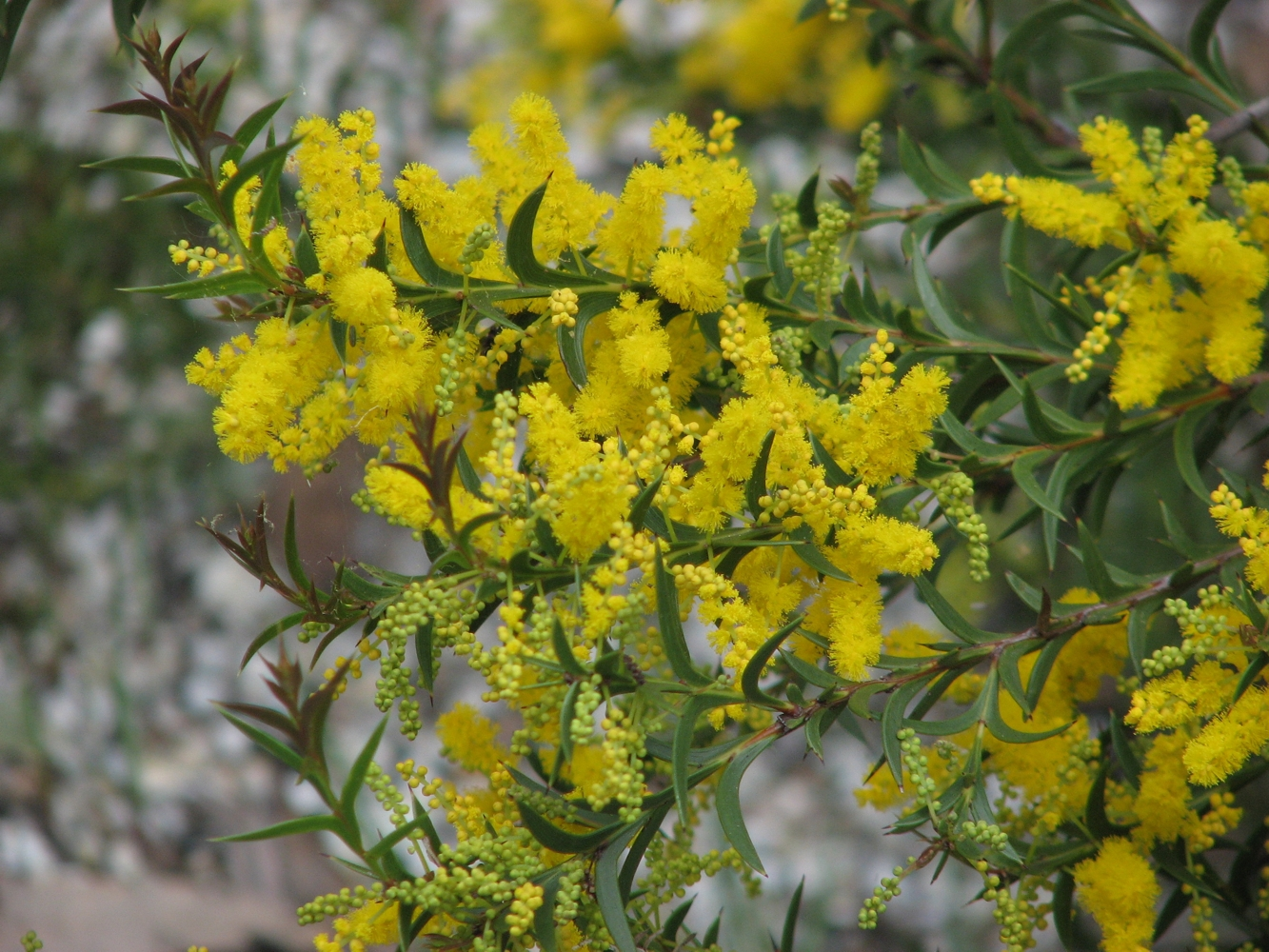
- In Maranoa Gardens

Conservation status
- Least Concern (IUCN 3.1)

Scientific classification
- Kingdom: Plantae
- Clade: Embryophytes
- Clade: Tracheophytes
- Clade: Spermatophytes
- Clade: Angiosperms
- Clade: Eudicots
- Clade: Rosids
- Order: Fabales
- Family: Fabaceae
- Subfamily: Caesalpinioideae
- Clade: Mimosoid clade
- Genus: Acacia
- Species: A. triptera

Binomial name
- Acacia triptera Benth.
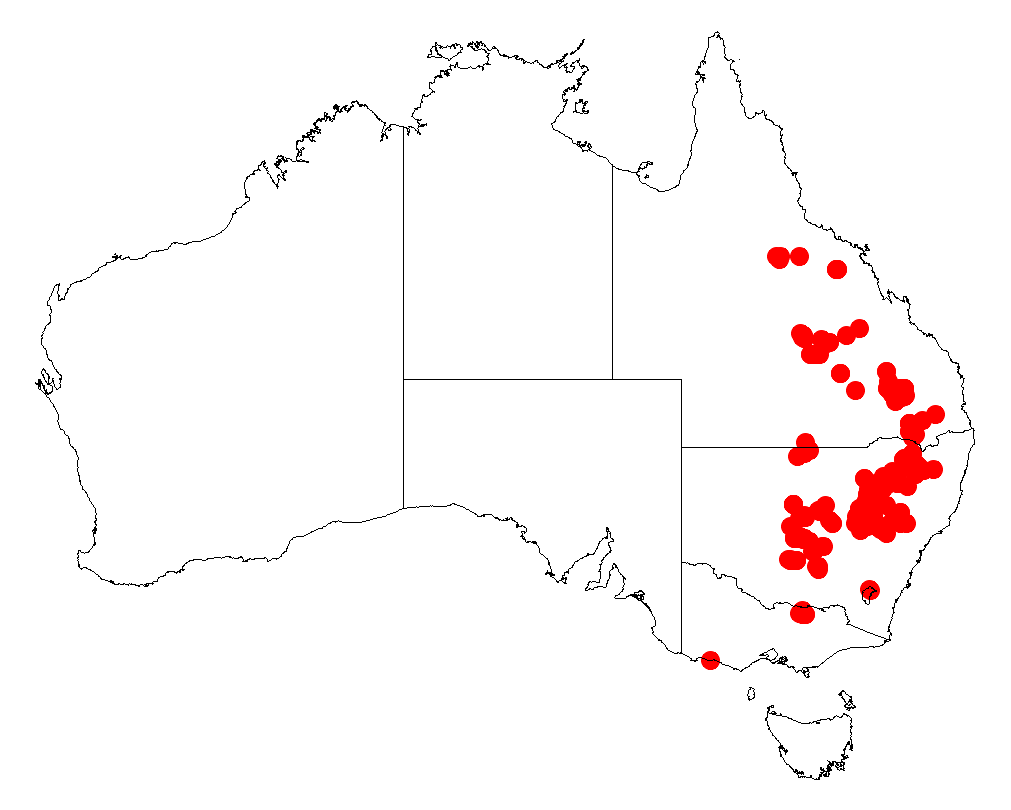
- Occurrence data from AVH

Synonyms
- Racosperma tripterum (Benth.) Pedley

= Acacia triptera =

Species of legume

Acacia triptera, commonly known as spurwing wattle, is an erect or spreading shrub which is endemic to Australia.

== Description ==
It grows to 2 m (6 ft 7 in) high and has an erect to spreading habit with terete and glabrous branchlets. Like most species of Acacia it has phyllodes rather than true leaves. The decurrent phyllodes which are falcate or sigmoidal in shape and have a length of 1.5 to 5.5 cm (0.59 to 2.17 in) with a width of 2 to 10 mm (0.079 to 0.394 in). The evergreen phyllodes have many longitudinal veins that are very close together. The bright yellow flowerheads appear from August to November. The simple inflorescences are found in pairs in the axils with cylindrical flower-heads that have a length of 1.5 to 3 cm (0.59 to 1.18 in) and are packed with golden flowers. Flowering is followed by curled or twisted brown seed pods which are 3 to 8 cm (1.2 to 3.1 in) and 2 to 4 mm (0.079 to 0.157 in) wide.

== Distribution ==
The species occurs on sandhills or rocky outcrops in mallee, woodland or heath in Victoria, New South Wales and Queensland.

== Taxonomy ==
The species was first formally described in 1842 by English botanist George Bentham in the London Journal of Botany. His description was based on plant material collected from north of the "Arbuthnot Range" (=Warrumbungles).

== Cultivation ==
Established plants tolerate dry periods and moderate frost.
