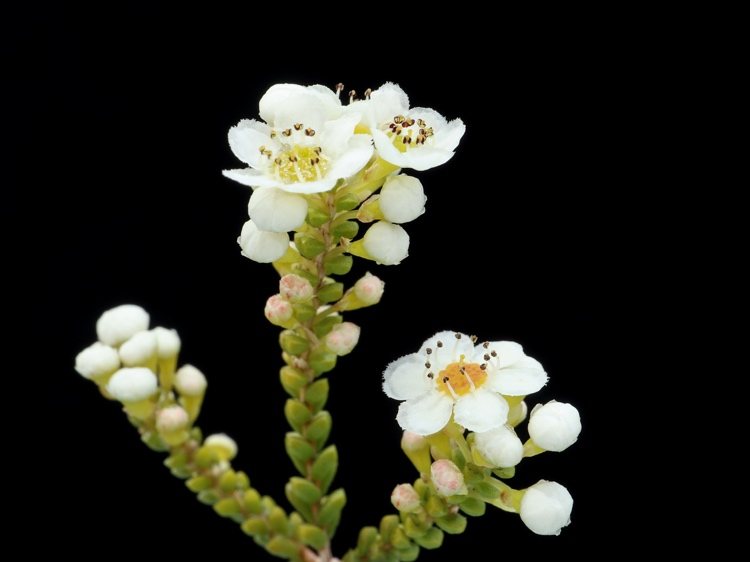
- In the Australian National Botanic Gardens

Scientific classification
- Kingdom: Plantae
- Clade: Tracheophytes
- Clade: Angiosperms
- Clade: Eudicots
- Clade: Rosids
- Order: Myrtales
- Family: Myrtaceae
- Genus: Micromyrtus
- Species: M. hexamera

Binomial name
- Micromyrtus hexamera (Maiden & Betche) Maiden and Betche

Synonyms
- Thryptomene hexamera Maiden & Betche

= Micromyrtus hexamera =

Species of shrub

Micromyrtus hexamera is a species of flowering plant in the myrtle family, Myrtaceae and is endemic to eastern Australia. It is a shrub with many drooping branches, egg-shaped leaves with the narrower end towards the base, and white to pink flowers arranged singly in leaf axils with 12 stamens in each flower.

== Description ==
Micromyrtus hexamera is a slender shrub that typically grows up to 2 m (6 ft 7 in) high and has many drooping branches. Its leaves are egg-shaped with the narrower end towards the base, 1.1–1.9 mm (0.043–0.075 in) long, 0.8–1 mm (0.031–0.039 in) wide and sessile or on a petiole up to 0.2 mm (0.0079 in) long. The leaves are glabrous and have a few prominent oil glands. The flowers are 5–6 mm (0.20–0.24 in) wide and arranged singly in leaf axils on a peduncle 0.7–1.2 mm (0.028–0.047 in) long, with 2 bracteoles about 1 mm (0.039 in) long at the base. There are 6 more or less round sepals 0.6–0.7 mm (0.024–0.028 in) long, and 6 more or less round white to pink petals 1.7–2.1 mm (0.067–0.083 in) long and wide. There are 12 stamens, the filaments about 1.0 mm (0.039 in) long. Flowering has been recorded in most months, with a peak in August and September, and the fruit contains a single seed.

== Taxonomy ==
This species was first formally described in 1901 by Joseph Maiden and Ernst Betche who gave it the name Thryptomene hexamera in the Proceedings of the Linnean Society of New South Wales. In 1916 they transferred the species to the genus Micromyrtus as M. hexamera in A Census of New South Wales Plants.

== Distribution and habitat ==
This species of micromyrtus grows in heath or shrubland near Cunnamulla and Charleville in Queensland and near Bourke, mainly between the Warrego and Darling Rivers, in northern New South Wales.
