= Davenport Murchison Ranges =

Bioregion in the Northern Territory of Australia

- Region
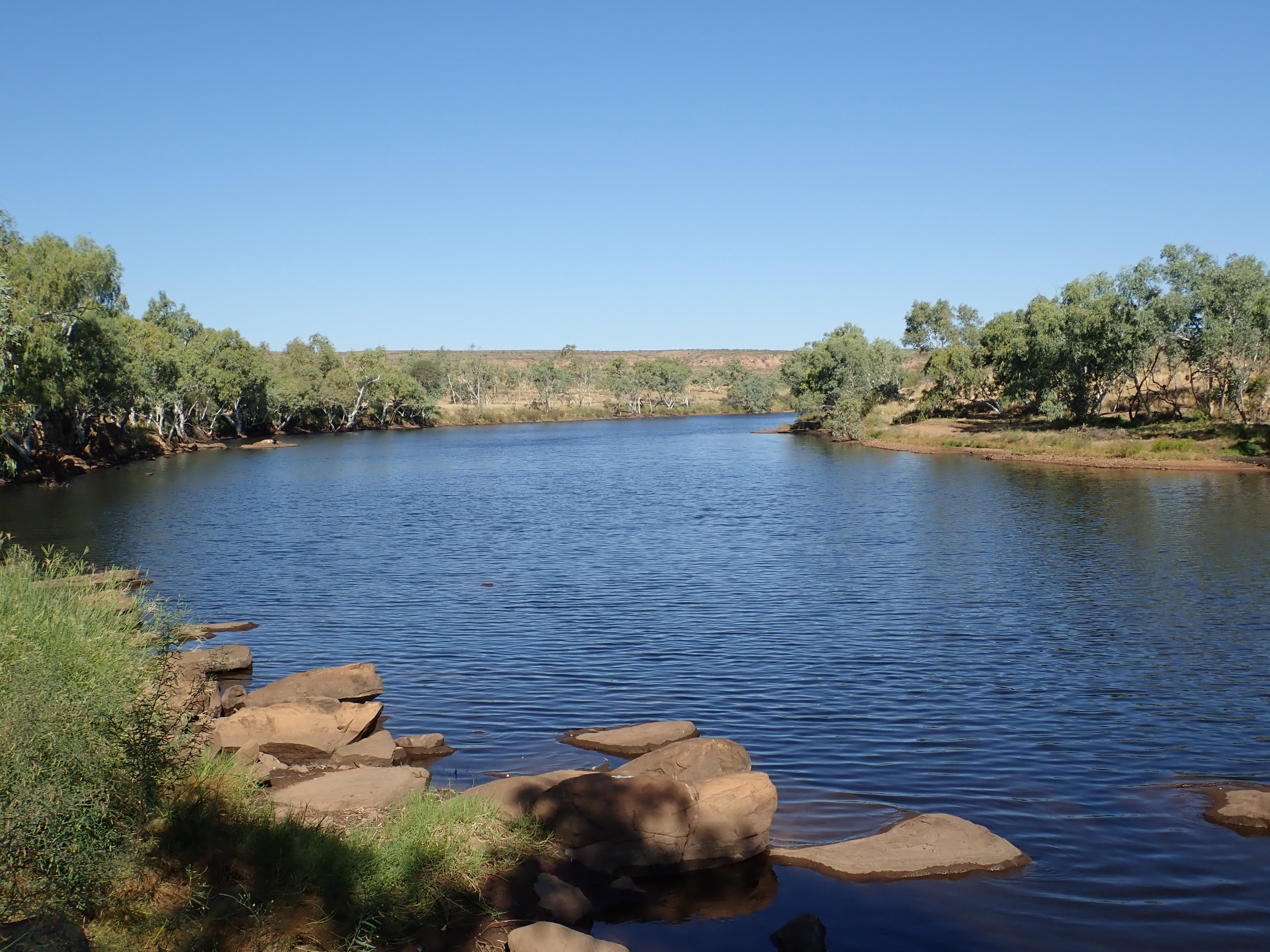
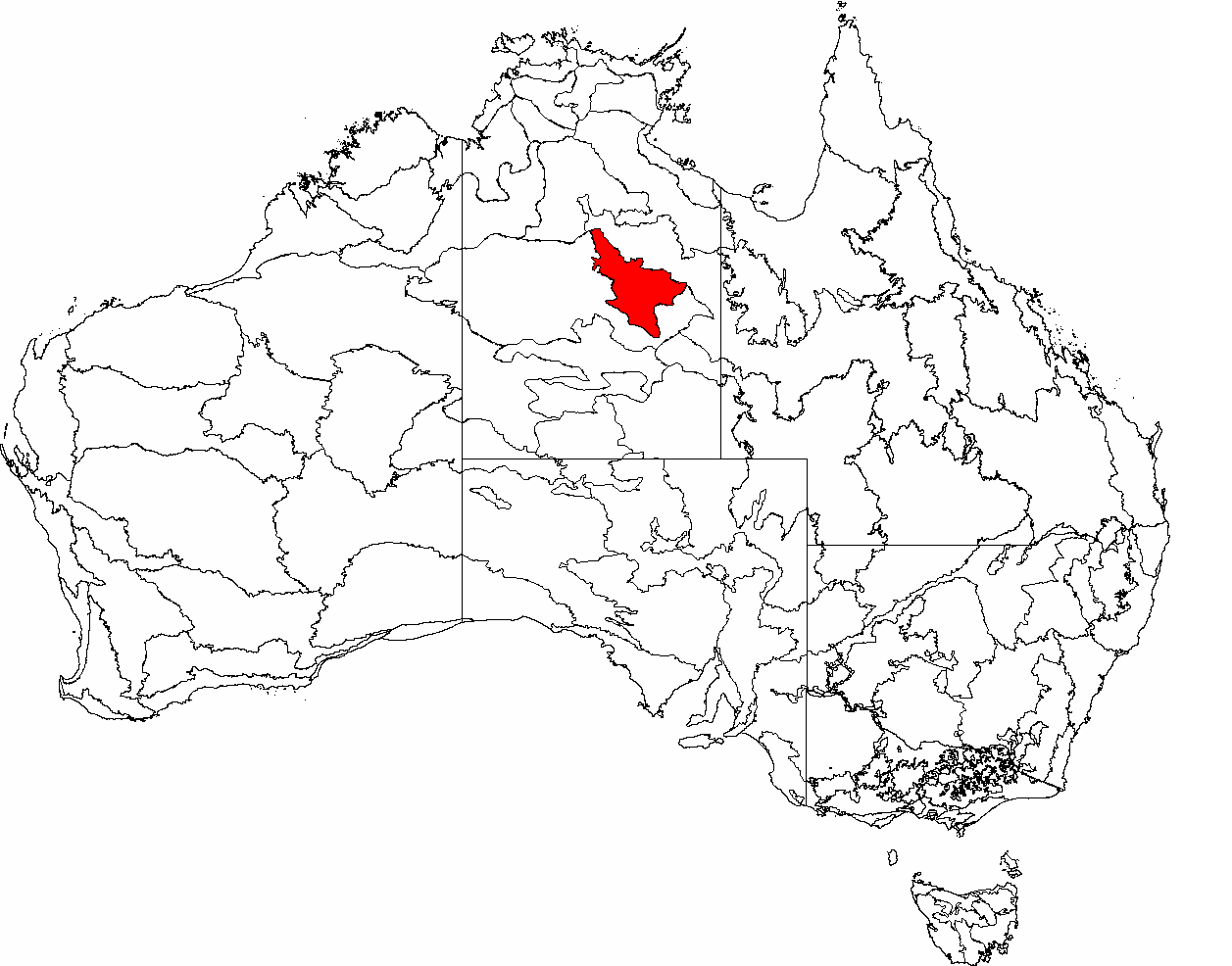
- Old Police Station Waterhole in Iytwelepenty / Davenport Range National Park The interim Australian bioregions, with Davenport Murchison Ranges in red
- Country: Australia
- State: Northern Territory

Area
  - Total: 58,051.08 km^{2} (22,413.65 sq mi)
Localities around Davenport Murchison Ranges
| Mitchell Grass Downs | Mitchell Grass Downs | Mitchell Grass Downs |
| Tanami | Davenport Murchison Ranges | Tanami |
| Tanami | Tanami | Tanami |

Davenport Murchison Ranges is an interim Australian bioregion located in the Northern Territory. It has an area of 5,805,108 hectares (14,344,730 acres). The bioregion is part of the larger Great Sandy-Tanami desert ecoregion.

== Subregions ==
Davenport Murchison Ranges is made up of three subregions:

- Ashburton Range (DMR01) – 1,218,621 hectares (3,011,280 acres)
- Davenport (DMR02) – 1,589,590 hectares (3,928,000 acres)
- Barkly (DMR03) – 2,996,897 hectares (7,405,490 acres)

== Protected areas ==
Less than 5% of the bioregion is in protected areas, the largest of which is Iytwelepenty / Davenport Range National Park in the Barkly subregion.
