= Tanami bioregion =

Tanami Australia
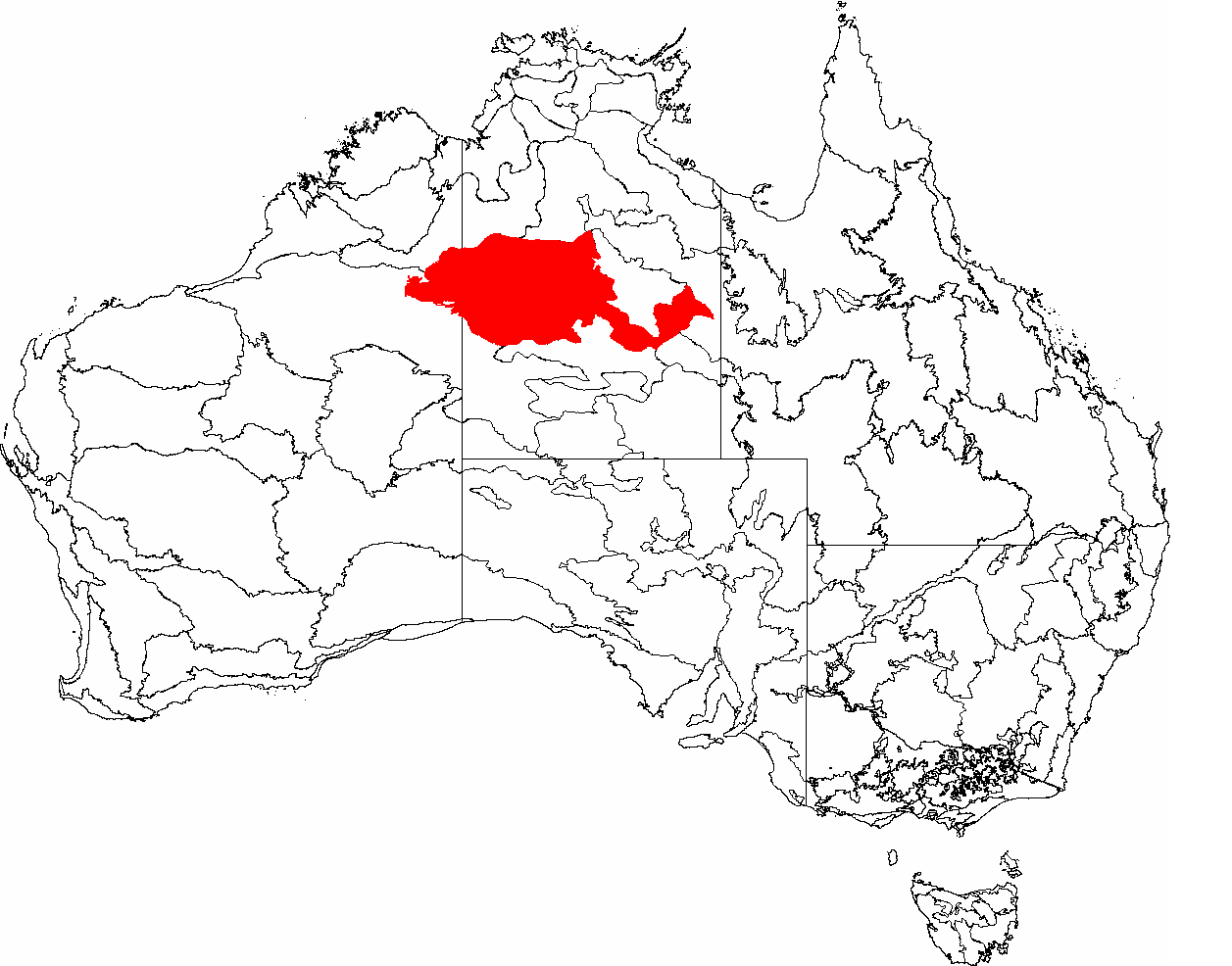
- The interim Australian bioregions, with Tanami in red
- Area: 259,972.77 km^{2} (100,376.0 sq mi)
Localities around Tanami:
Ord Victoria Plain	Sturt Plateau	Mitchell Grass Downs
Great Sandy Desert	Tanami	Davenport Murchison Ranges
Great Sandy Desert	Burt Plain	Channel Country

Tanami (Warlpiri: Jarnami) is an interim Australian bioregion, comprising 25,997,277 hectares (64,240,670 acres) in the Northern Territory and Western Australia. It is part of the Great Sandy-Tanami desert ecoregion.

The bioregion has the code TAN. There are three subregions.

IBRA regions and subregions: IBRA7
IBRA region / subregion	IBRA code	Area	States	Location in Australia
Tanami	TAN	25,997,277 hectares (64,240,670 acres)	NT / WA	
Tanami Desert	TAN01	20,769,151 hectares (51,321,690 acres)	NT / WA	
Wycliffe	TAN02	1,600,893 hectares (3,955,890 acres)	NT / WA	
Sandover	TAN03	3,627,233 hectares (8,963,090 acres)	NT / WA	

== See also ==
- Geography of Australia
