= Burt Plain =

Ecoregion in the Northern Territory, Australia

Burt Plain Northern Territory
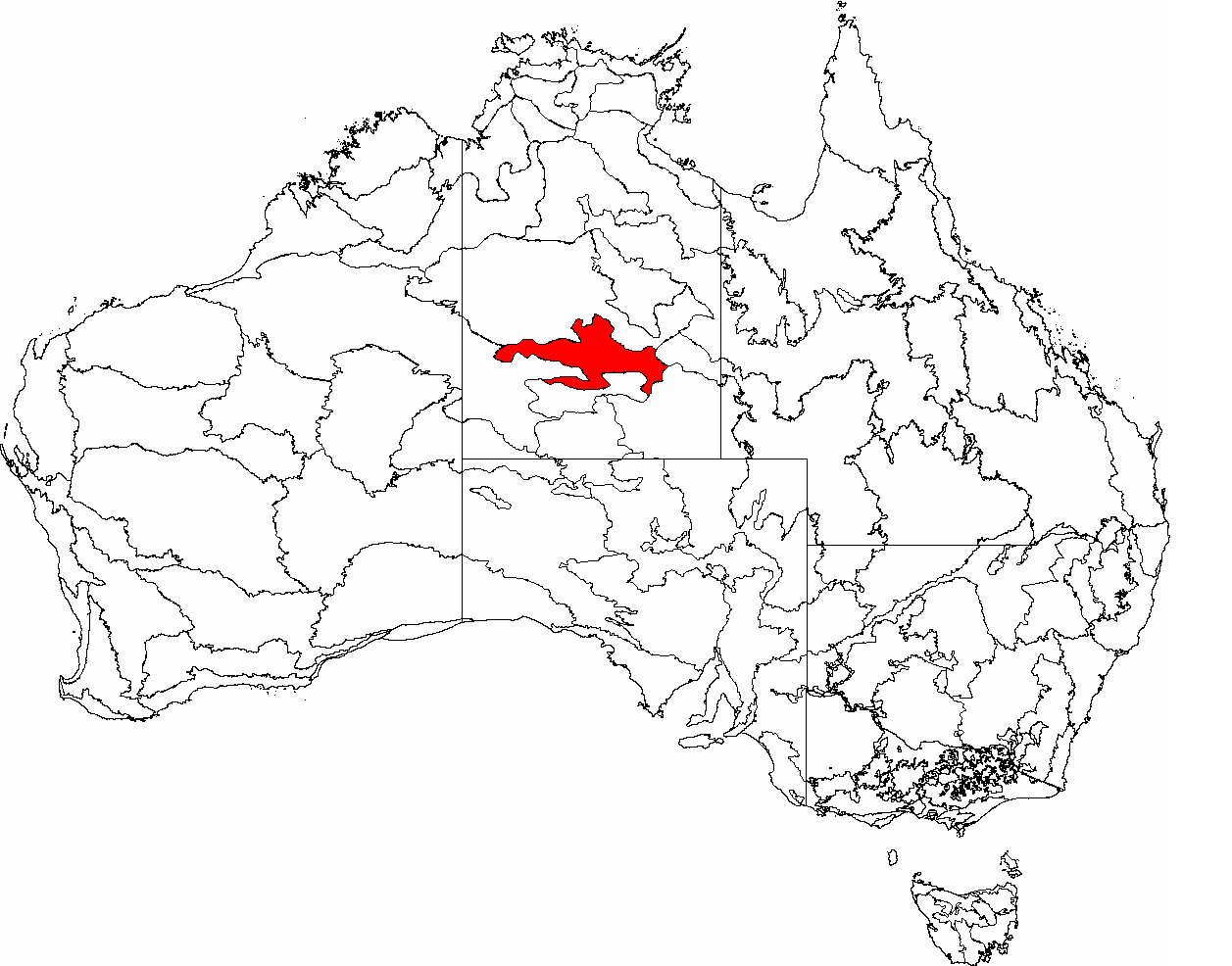
- The interim Australian bioregions, with Burt Plain in red
- Area: 73,797.19 km^{2} (28,493.3 sq mi)
Localities around Burt Plain:
Great Sandy Desert	Tanami	Tanami
Great Sandy Desert	Burt Plain	Channel Country
MacDonnell Ranges	MacDonnell Ranges	Simpson Strzelecki Dunefields

Burt Plain, an interim Australian bioregion, is located in the Northern Territory, and comprises 7,379,719 hectares (18,235,680 acres).

The bioregion has the code BRT. There are four subregions.

IBRA regions and subregions: IBRA7
IBRA region / subregion	IBRA code	Area	States	Location in Australia
Burt Plain	BRT	7,379,719 hectares (18,235,680 acres)	NT	
Yuendumu	BRT01	2,931,061 ha (7,242,810 acres)	NT	
Atartinga	BRT02	3,531,111 ha (8,725,570 acres)	NT	
Mount Chapple	BRT03	390,981 ha (966,140 acres)	NT	
Dulcie	BRT04	526,567 ha (1,301,180 acres)	NT	

== See also ==
- Geography of Australia
- Dulcie Range National Park
