= Illyria (disambiguation) =

Illyria is a historical region in Southeastern Europe, inhabited in antiquity by the Illyrians.

Illyria may also refer to:

== Places ==
- Roman Illyria or Illyricum, a region of the Roman Empire, incorporating ancient Illyria and surrounding regions
- A general early modern reference to areas speaking Illyrian (Slavic) or involved in the late modern Illyrian movement
- Illyrian Provinces (1809–14), a division of the First French Empire, situated on eastern coast of the Adriatic Sea
- Kingdom of Illyria (1816–49), a crown land of the Austrian Empire

== Arts and entertainment ==
- Illyria, a county in which William Shakespeare's Twelfth Night is set
- Illyria (Angel), a fictional character in the Angel TV series created by Joss Whedon
- Illyria (musical), a musical with book, music, and lyrics by Pete Mills
- Illyria, a novella by Elizabeth Hand
- Illyria (play), a play by Bryony Lavery
- Illyria, a play by writer/director Richard Nelson
- Illyria, a fictional Eastern European country from the play Dirty Hands by Jean-Paul Sartre
- Illyria, a fictional place occupied by the Illyrians in the book series A Court of Thorns and Roses by Sarah J. Maas
- Illyria, a fictional planet in Star Trek: Strange New Worlds

== Vessels ==
- Albanian patrol vessel Iliria (P 131), a 42-metre, 240-ton, Albanian patrol vessel
- Illyria, a ferry, launched as MV Hebrides

== Other uses ==
- 1160 Illyria, an asteroid discovered by Karl Wilhelm Reinmuth
- Illyria (cicada), a genus of translucent cicadas
- Illyria (village), in Luhansk Oblast, Ukraine
- Illyria Pty Ltd, an Australian investment company owned by American mass media businessman Lachlan Murdoch

== See also ==
- Iliria College, Iliria Royal University Prishtina
- Illyrian (disambiguation)
- Illyrians (disambiguation)
- Illyricum (disambiguation)
- Illyricus (disambiguation)
