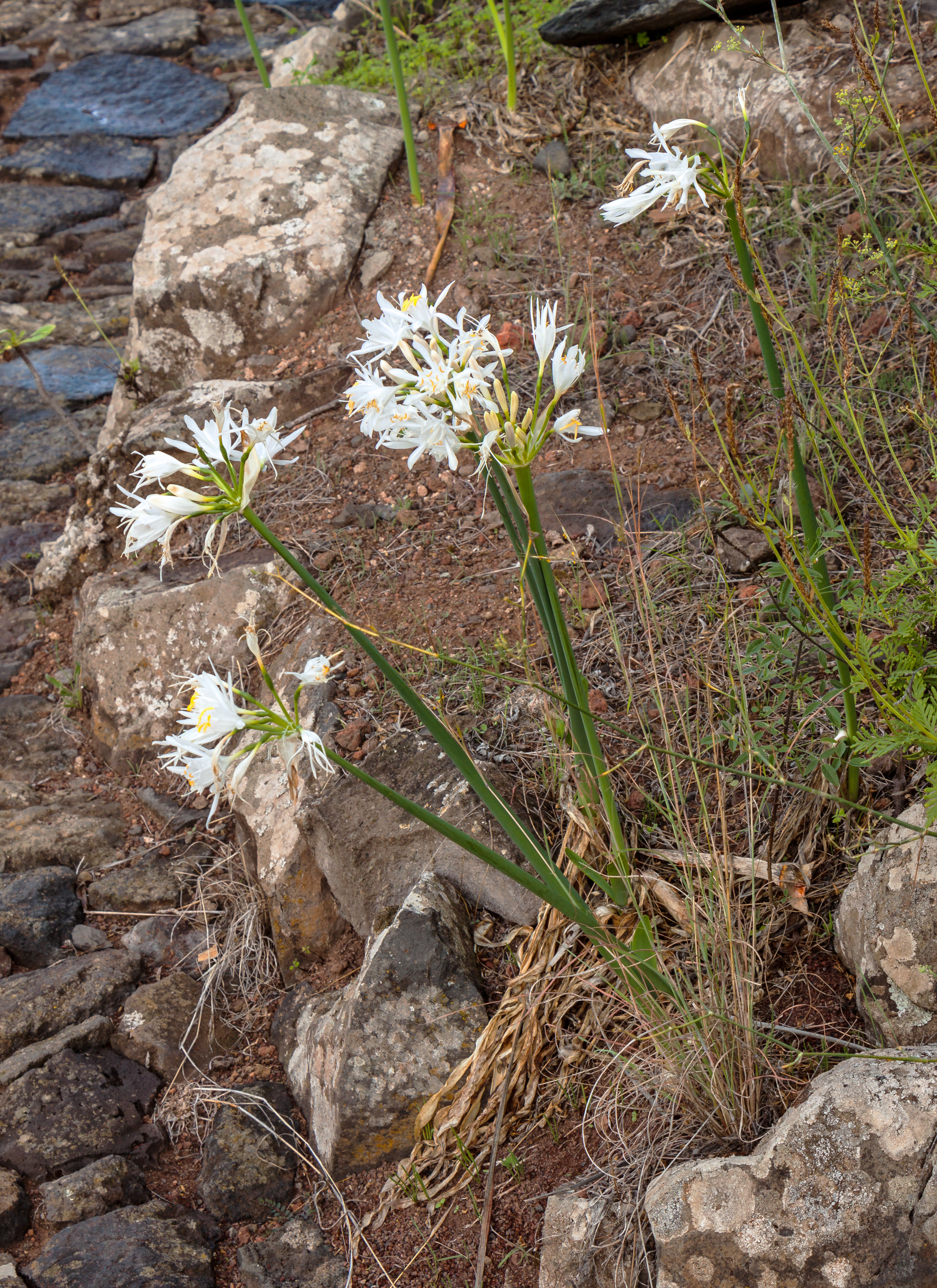

Scientific classification
- Kingdom: Plantae
- Clade: Embryophytes
- Clade: Tracheophytes
- Clade: Spermatophytes
- Clade: Angiosperms
- Clade: Monocots
- Order: Asparagales
- Family: Amaryllidaceae
- Subfamily: Amaryllidoideae
- Genus: Pancratium
- Species: P. canariense

Binomial name
- Pancratium canariense Ker Gawler

Synonyms
- Bollaea canariensis (Ker Gawler) Parl. Narcissus canariensis (Ker Gawler) Burbidge; Pancratium teneriffae Willd.

= Pancratium canariense =

Species of flowering plant

Pancratium canariense or the Canary Sea Daffodil is a species of bulbous plant endemic to the Canary Islands. It grows on north facing slopes in good light, not exposed to hot burning sun and not baking drought. It grows in fertile soil between rocks and shrubs. It flowers in the early autumn. The name canariense means "from the Canary Islands".

== Description ==
Bulbous perennial with glaucous leaves. It forms quite large bulbs (12–15 cm diameter) with a short neck. The plant is winter growing and summer dormant. Scape to 80 cm. Flowers in a multiflowered umbel, white with a corona. Very fragrant. Flowers in the fall. Pancratium illyricum from southern Europe is very similar. It has narrower leaves, shorter flower-stalks and flowers in the spring.

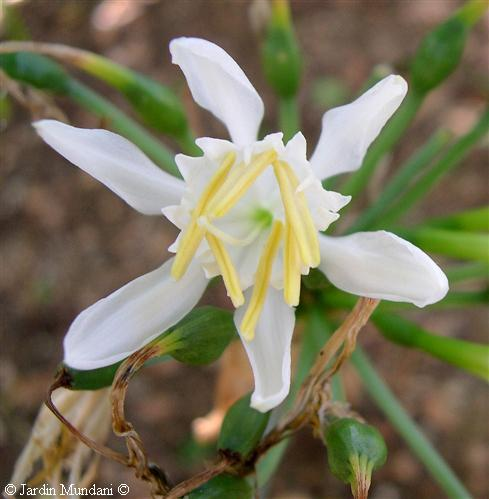
Photo: Juan Bibiloni

== Cultivation ==
Easy to grow and flowers freely if planted in a sunny spot. It does not tolerate frost, but should be very good for coastal Californian gardens in the fog belt. Hardy to USDA zone 10.
