= Illyricum =

Illyricum may refer to:

- Illyria, a region in Southeastern Europe in classical antiquity, inhabited by ancient Illyrians
- Illyricum (Roman province), a Roman province that existed between 27 BC and 69/79 AD
- Diocese of Illyricum, a diocese of the Late Roman Empire
- Praetorian prefecture of Illyricum, one of four praetorian prefectures into which the Late Roman Empire was divided
- Illyrian Provinces, an autonomous province of France during the First French Empire 1809-1814
- Illyricum sacrum, a classic eight volume historical work, published from 1751 to 1819

== Species and subspecies ==
- Pancratium illyricum, a flowering plant species
- Polystichum illyricum, a fern hybrid species
- Onopordum illyricum

== See also ==
- Illyricus (disambiguation)
- Illyrians (disambiguation)
- Illyrian (disambiguation)
- Illyria (disambiguation)
- Illyricvm, 2022 historical film with reconstructed Illyrian language
