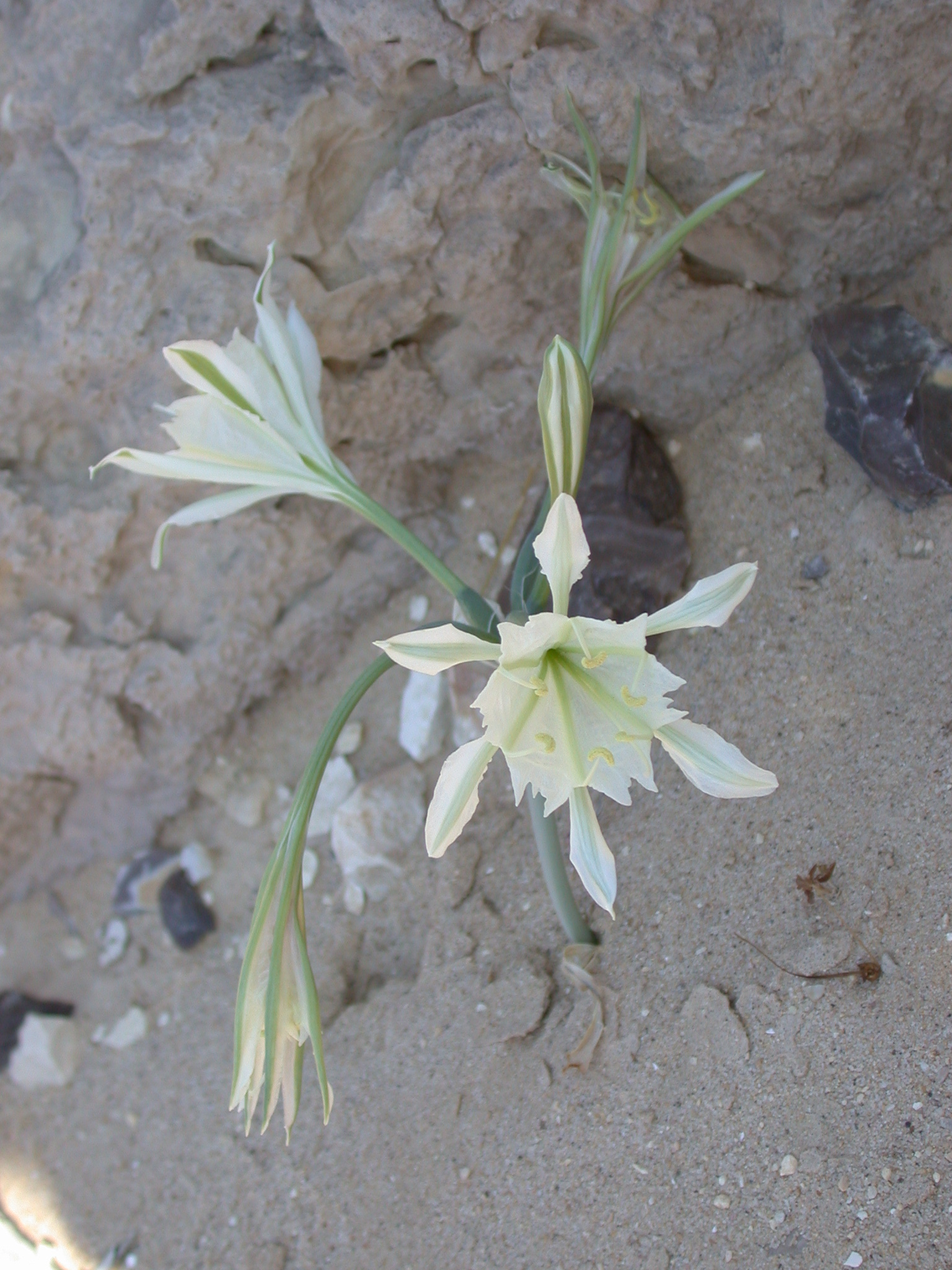

Scientific classification
- Kingdom: Plantae
- Clade: Embryophytes
- Clade: Tracheophytes
- Clade: Angiosperms
- Clade: Monocots
- Order: Asparagales
- Family: Amaryllidaceae
- Subfamily: Amaryllidoideae
- Genus: Pancratium
- Species: P. sickenbergeri

Binomial name
- Pancratium sickenbergeri Asch. & Schweinf.

= Pancratium sickenbergeri =

rain flower

Species of flowering plant

Pancratium sickenbergeri is a species of flowering plant in the Amaryllidaceae family. It is a Saharo-Arabian plant that grows in deserts, such as the Negev. It is native to Israel, Egypt, Lebanon, Saudi Arabia, and Syria. The flowers look like the Mediterranean species Pancratium maritimum, but the leaves of P. sickenbergeri are curly and the plant is much smaller. Unusually for the desert, the seeds are distributed by floodwaters when they occur in the winter.
