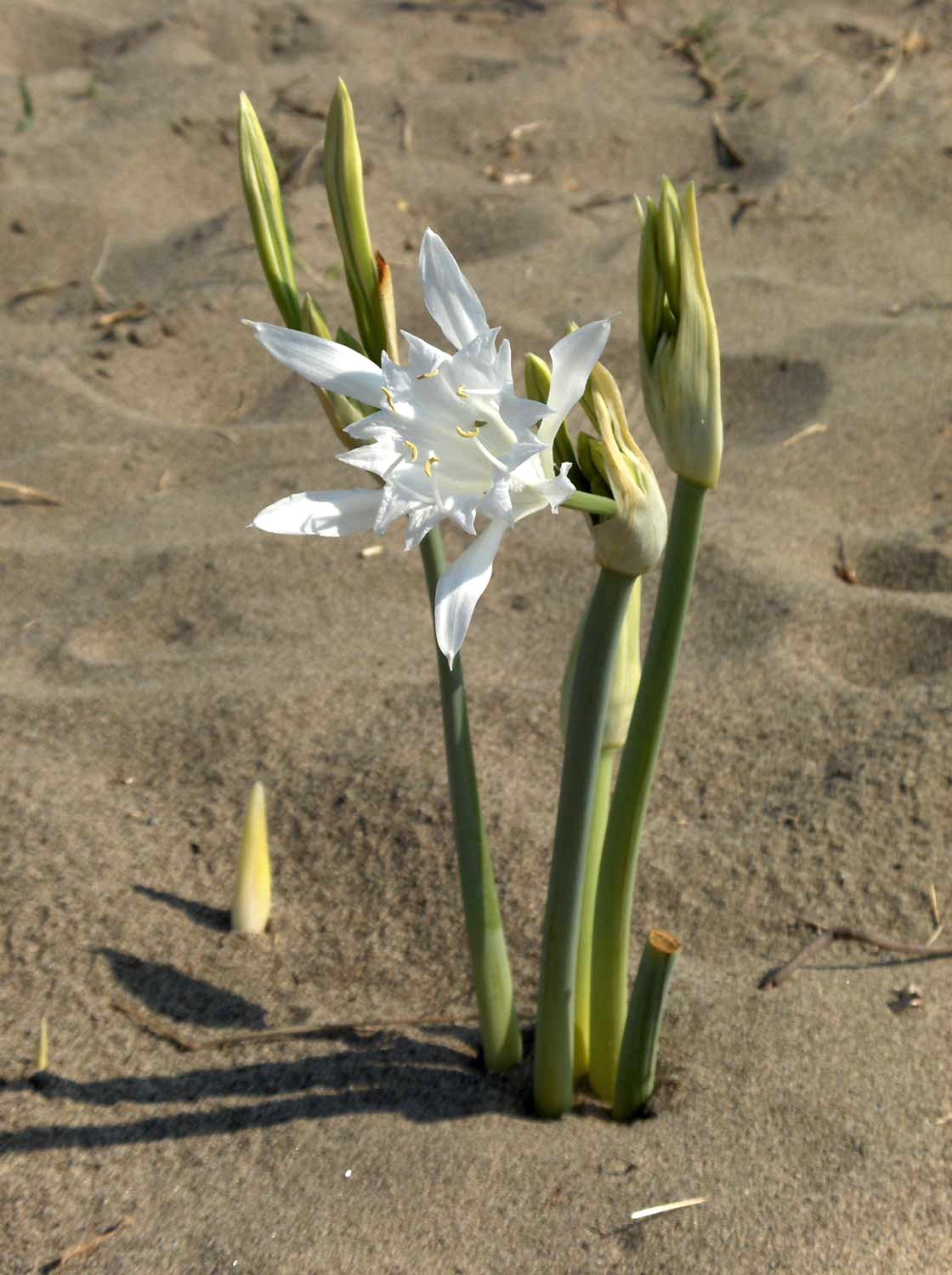
- Pancratium maritimum

Scientific classification
- Kingdom: Plantae
- Clade: Tracheophytes
- Clade: Angiosperms
- Clade: Monocots
- Order: Asparagales
- Family: Amaryllidaceae
- Subfamily: Amaryllidoideae
- Genus: Pancratium; Dill. ex L.

Type species
- Pancratium maritimum L.

Synonyms
- List: Halmyra Herb.; Tiaranthus Herb.; Zouchia Raf.; Bollaea Parl.; Almyra Salisb.; Chapmanolirion Dinter; Mizonia A.Chev.

= Pancratium (plant) =

Genus of flowering plants

Pancratium is a genus of African and Eurasian perennial, herbaceous and bulbous plants in the Amaryllis family, subfamily Amaryllidoideae

== Description ==
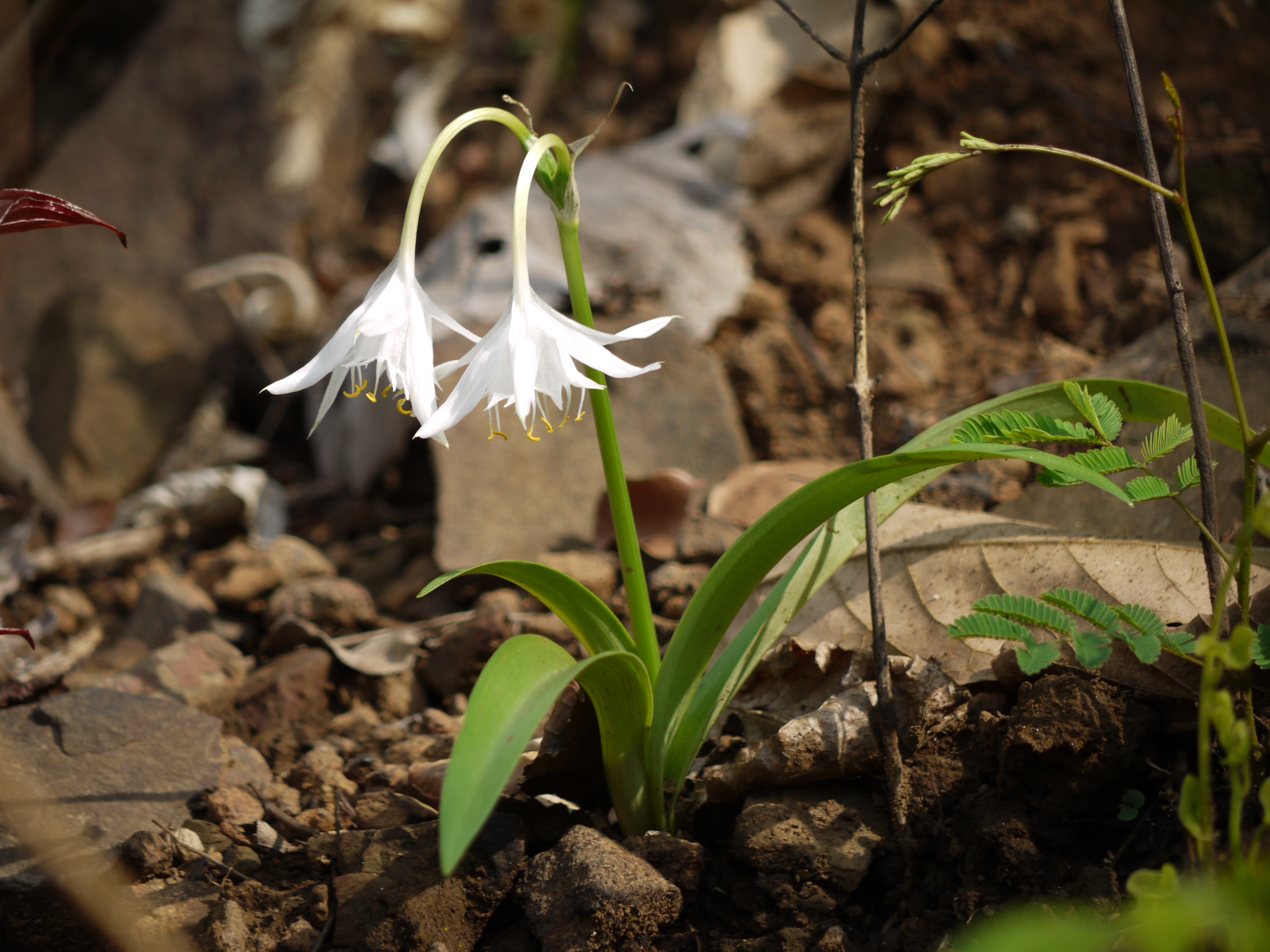
Pancratium triflorum flowering

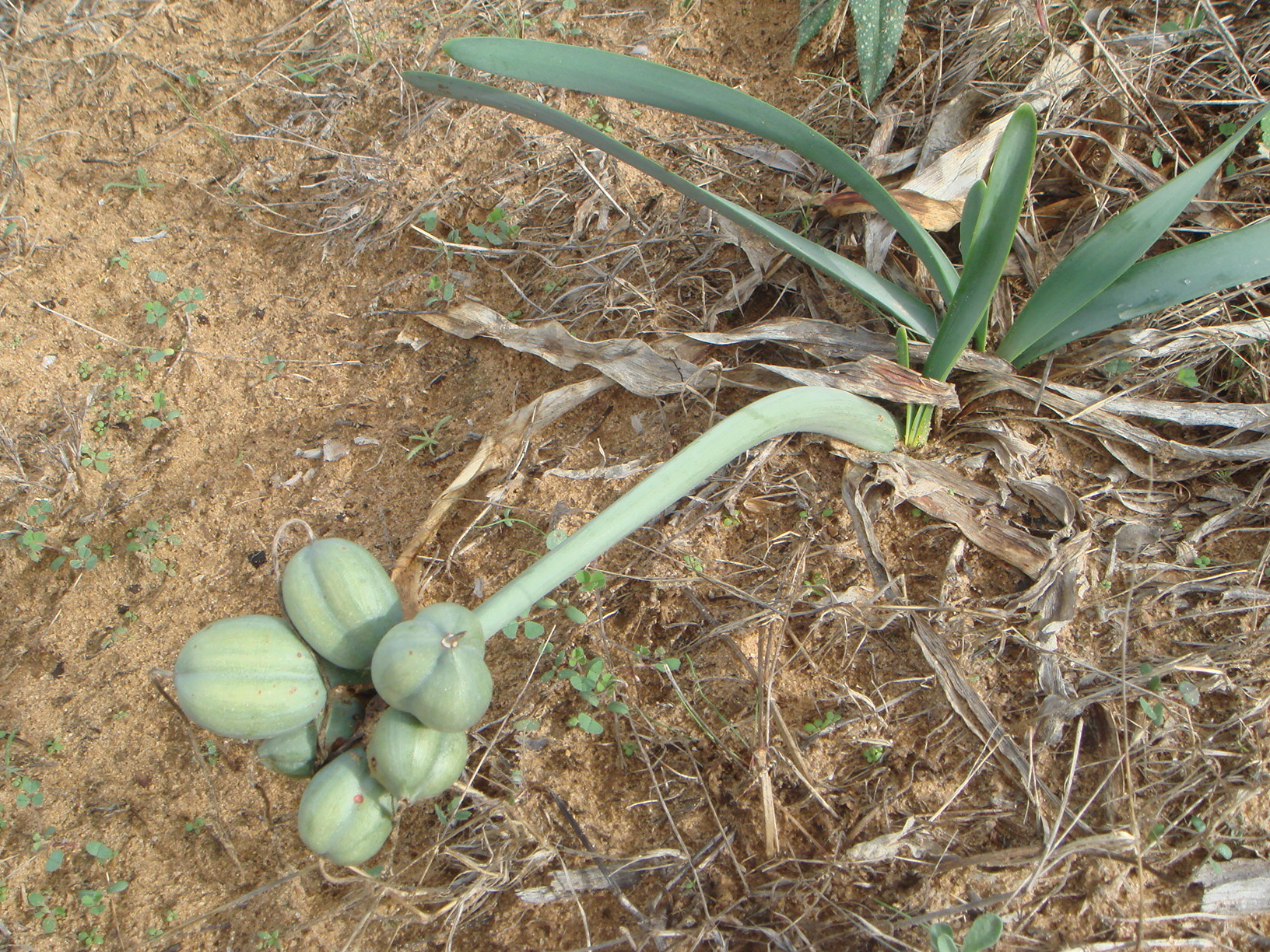
Pancratium maritimum fruiting

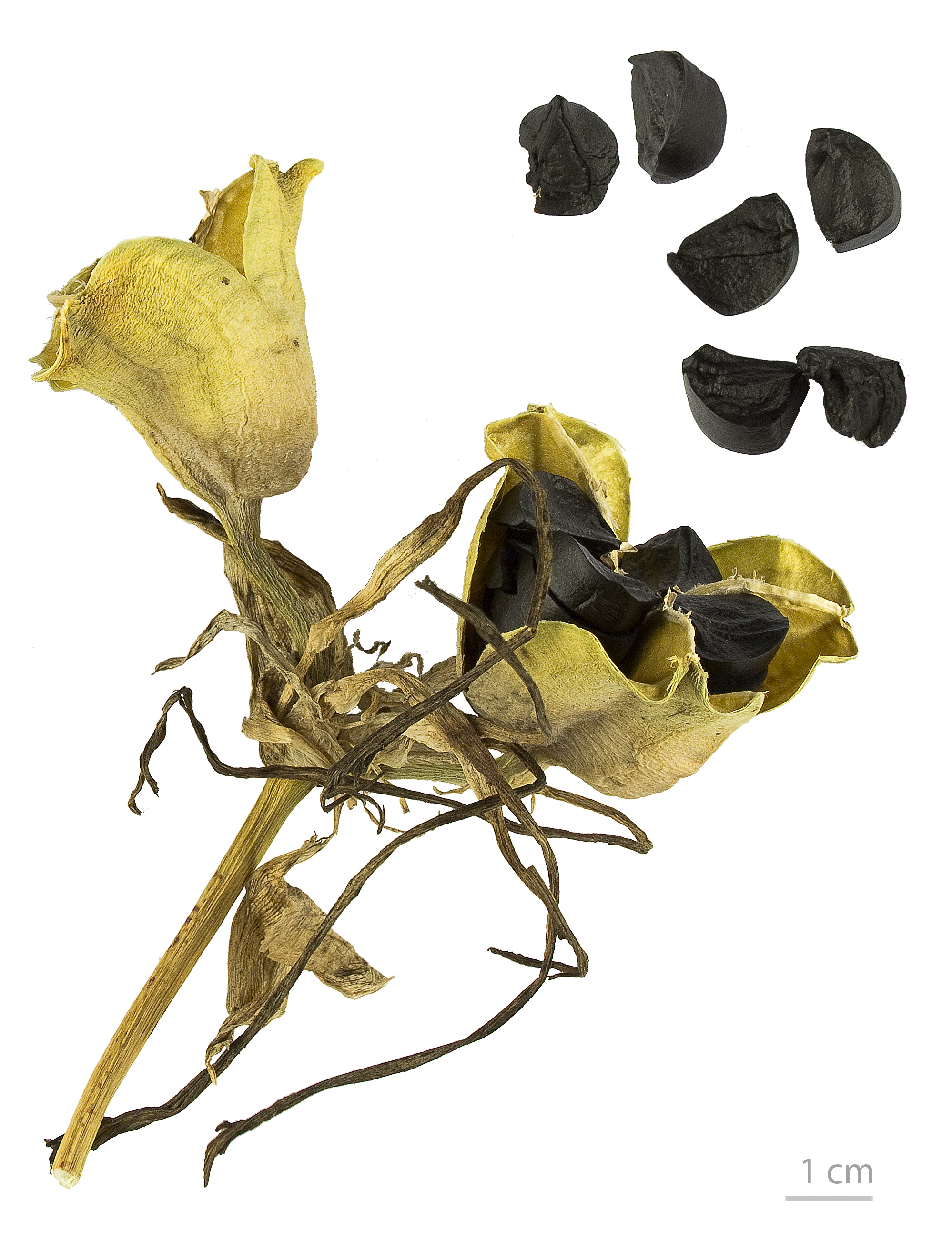
Pancratium maritimum capsule fruits and seeds

=== Vegetative characteristics ===
Pancratium are perennial, bulbous, herbs with long-necked bulbs and linear or ligulate, basal, sessile leaves.

=== Generative characteristics ===
The flowers are large, white and fragrant. The perianth tube and the corona are present. It differs from the similar Hymenocallis in its numerous seeds with a thin black skin. The loculicidal capsule fruit bears black, glossy seeds.

=== Cytology ===
The chromosome count is 2n = 22.

== Taxonomy ==
It was published by Carl Linnaeus in 1753. The lectotype species Pancratium maritimum L. was designated in 1918. It is placed in the tribe Pancratieae.

=== Etymology ===
The name Pancratium is derived from the Greek and means "all-strength", probably referring to the strength of a plant that can tolerate extreme climates. Pancratium species often inhabit extremely dry and sandy areas.

=== Species ===
Many species have been published using the name Pancratium, but most have been transferred to other genera (Clinanthus, Hymenocallis, Ismene, Proiphys and Stenomesson). Only a few species are cultivated. P. maritimum and P. illyricum being the hardiest for outdoor cultivation, but shy flowering in cool areas. P. zeylanicum is sometimes grown as a hothouse container plant.

As of June 2023, Plants of the World Online of the Royal Botanic Gardens, Kew accepted 24 species in the genus:

- Pancratium arabicum Sickenb. - Egypt
- Pancratium bhramarambae Sadas.
- Pancratium biflorum Roxb. - India, Bangladesh, Sri Lanka, Hong Kong
- Pancratium canariense Ker Gawl. - Canary Islands
- Pancratium centrale (A.Chev.) Traub - Cameroon, Chad, Ethiopia, Central African Republic
- Pancratium donaldii Blatt. - India
- Pancratium foetidum Pomel - Morocco, Algeria, Tunisia, Libya
- Pancratium illyricum L. - Corsica, Sardinia, Capri Island
- Pancratium landesii Traub - Oman
- Pancratium longiflorum Roxb. ex Ker Gawl. - India
- Pancratium maritimum L. - Canary Islands, Mediterranean, Caucasus
- Pancratium maximum Forssk. - Sudan, Saudi Arabia, Yemen, Oman
- Pancratium nairii Sasikala & Reema Kumari
- Pancratium parvicoronatum Geerinck - Democratic Republic of the Congo to Malawi
- Pancratium parvum Dalzell - India
- Pancratium sickenbergeri Asch. & Schweinf. - Egypt, Lebanon, Isreal, Syria, Saudi Arabia
- Pancratium st-mariae Blatt. & Hallb. - India
- Pancratium telanganense Sadas.
- Pancratium tenuifolium Hochst. ex A.Rich. - tropical and southern Africa
- Pancratium tortuosum Herb. - Egypt, Eritrea, Sudan, Saudi Arabia
- Pancratium trianthum Herb. - Sahara, Sahel
- Pancratium triflorum Roxb. - India, Bangladesh
- Pancratium verecundum Aiton - Himalayas
- Pancratium zeylanicum L. - India, Maldives, Sri Lanka, Borneo, Java, Sulawesi, Philippines, Maluku

Additionally, further species have been recently described:

- Pancratium venkaiahii

== Distribution ==
It is native to Africa, the Mediterranean, and Malesia. It has been introduced to the Azores, Bermuda, the Comoros, Great Britain, and the USA.

== Ecology ==
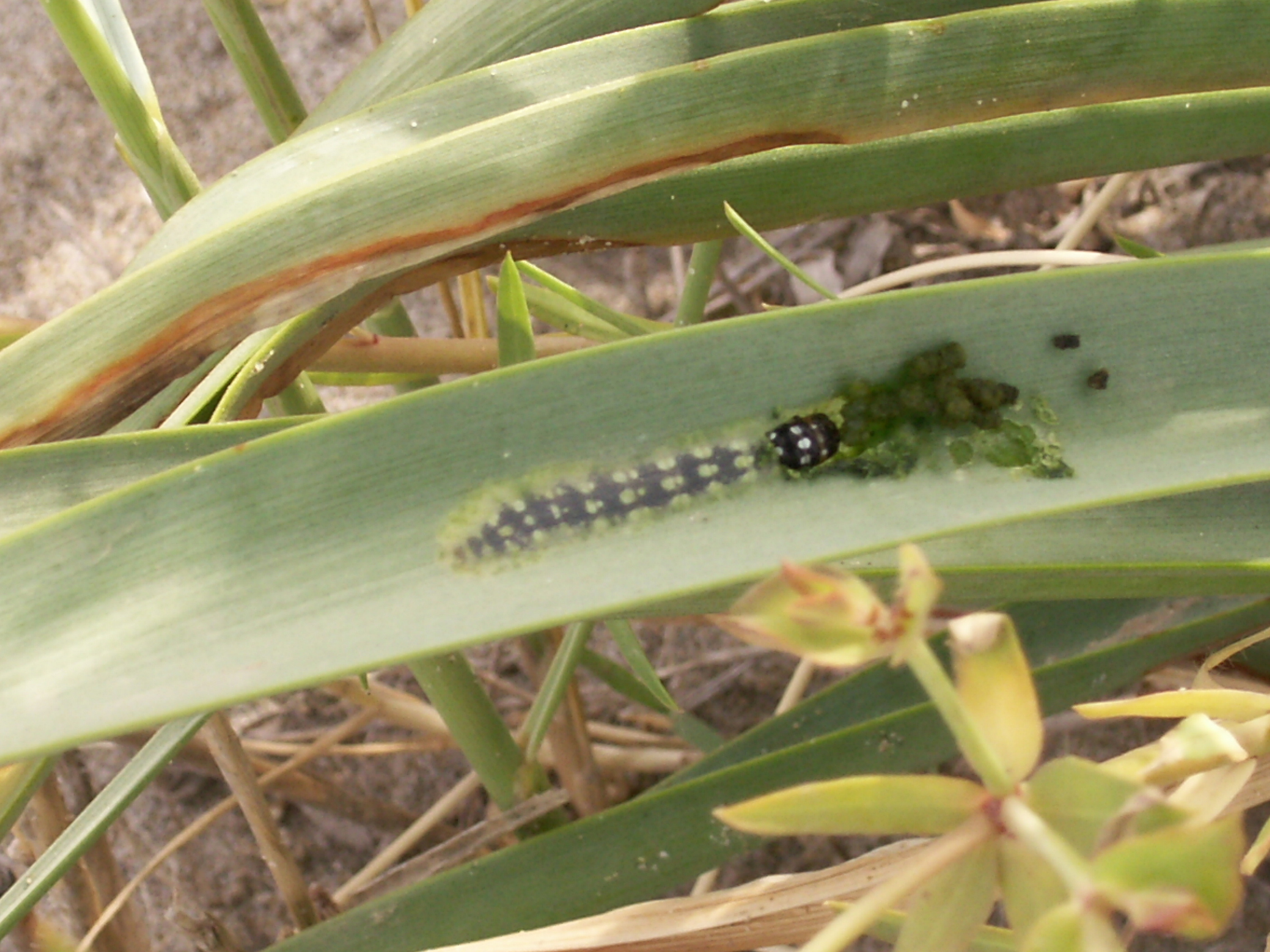
Brythis crini feeding on Pancratium maritimum within the leaf itself in Playa del Serradal, Castellón

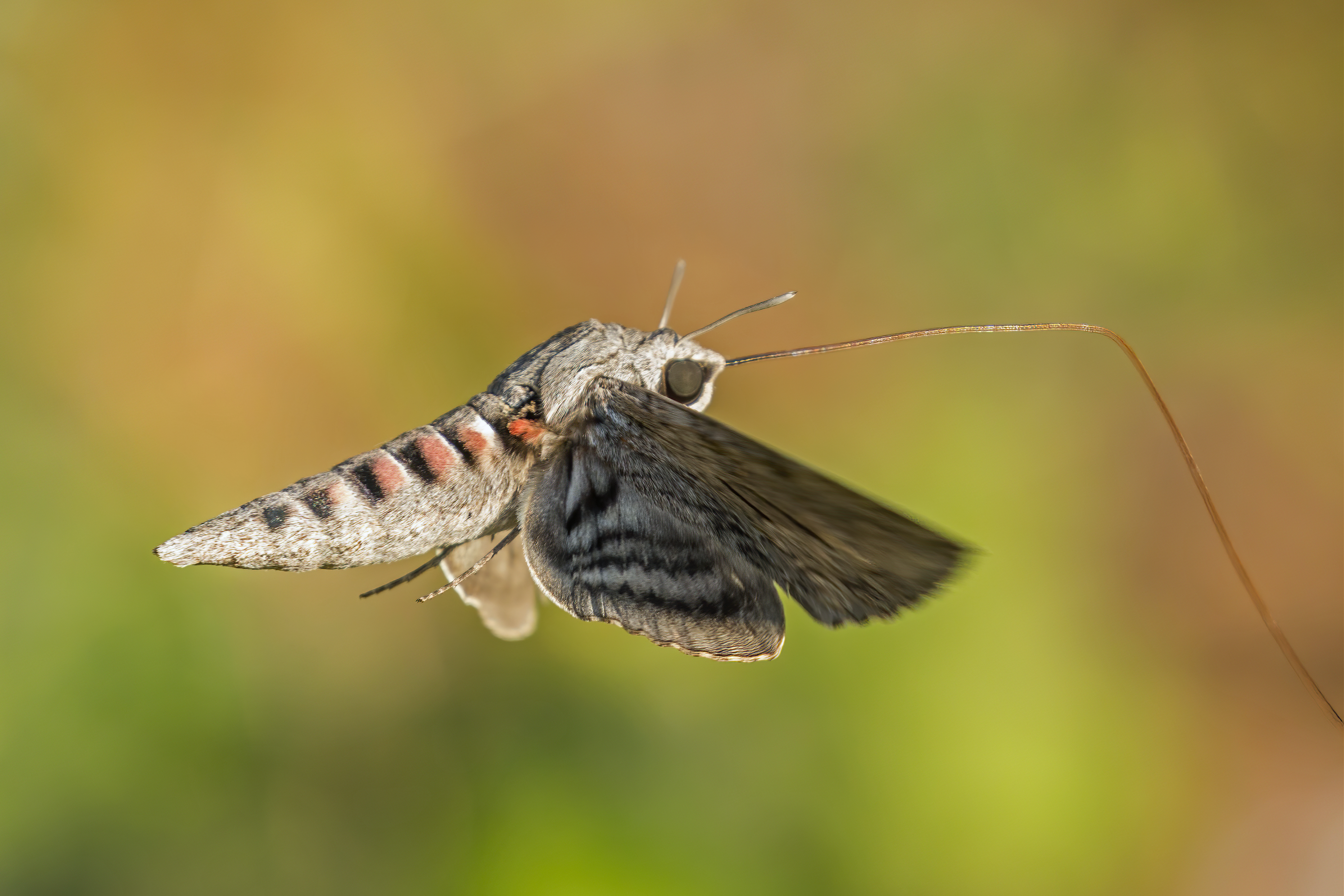
The Convolvulus hawk moth Agrius convolvuli, an effective pollinator of Pancratium

=== Pollination ecology ===
Pancratium tenuifolium and Pancratium maritimum is pollinated by the moth species Agrius convolvuli. In Pancratium maritimum pollination by bees, namely Xylocopa violacea, Apis mellifera, and Anthophora bimaculata, has also been reported. However, it has been stated that bees are not effective pollinators of this species and that it fully depends on hawkmoths for effective pollination.

=== Herbivory ===
The moth species Brithys crini feeds on Pancratium maritimum in the larval stage.

== Use ==
=== Horticulture ===
Pancratium zeylanicum is commonly cultivated in Asia.

=== Cultural significance ===
Plants belonging to the genus Pancratium have been found in prehistoric Cretan frescoes.
