= Pancratium maximum =

Scientific classification
- Kingdom: Plantae
- Clade: Embryophytes
- Clade: Tracheophytes
- Clade: Spermatophytes
- Clade: Angiosperms
- Clade: Monocots
- Order: Asparagales
- Family: Amaryllidaceae
- Subfamily: Amaryllidoideae
- Genus: Pancratium
- Species: P. maximum

Binomial name
- Pancratium maximum Forssk.

Species of flowering plant

Pancratium maximum is a perennial glabrous herb that grows up to 30 cm tall arising from a bulb. It is endemic to south western Arabia.

== Characteristics ==
Pancratium maximum is a perennial glabrous herb up to 20 cm tall arising from a bulb. The bulb is globose, 4–6 cm in diameter, narrowed above into a cylindrical neck, covered with several layers of dark reddish brown papery tunics. Leaves 2–7 cm long, variable in width, linear-elliptic to narrowly elliptic or ovate and abruptly narrowed into a petiole below, 10–30 cm long x 2.3–18 cm across. The flower is white with yellow anthers and black angular seeds.

== Habitat ==
Pancratium maximum flowers during the monsoon rains. It grows throughout the areas in Dhofar affected by the monsoon and can be seen in a variety of different environments including coastal plains, wooded mountain slopes, grasslands and high plateaus at the back of mountains.

== Uses ==
Pancratium maximum is completely useless as fodder for livestock. The bulb and the leaves are toxic to all livestock.
