= Illyrian dog =

Illyrian dog may refer to:

- Illyrian Hound, another name of the Barak hound, a dog breed of the scenthound type
- Illyrian Shepherd, an extinct dog breed, predecessor of three modern breeds:
  - Šarplaninac, a livestock-guardian dog named after the Sharr Mountains
  - Karst Shepherd, a livestock-guardian dog, originating in Slovenia
  - Deltari Ilir, a rare livestock-guardian dog, accepted nationally in Kosovo and several other Eastern European countries

== See also ==
- Illyrian (disambiguation)
