= Illyria ignis =

Scientific classification
- Kingdom: Animalia
- Phylum: Arthropoda
- Clade: Pancrustacea
- Class: Insecta
- Order: Hemiptera
- Suborder: Auchenorrhyncha
- Family: Cicadidae
- Genus: Illyria
- Species: I. ignis

Binomial name
- Illyria ignis Emery, Emery & Ong, 2022

Species of cicada

Illyria ignis, also known as the Kimberley rattler, is a species of cicada in the true cicada family. It is endemic to Australia.

== Description ==
The forewing length is 23–27 mm.

== Distribution and habitat ==
The species occurs in the Kimberley region of far north Western Australia, from Kings Sound eastwards to the Northern Territory border. The habitat includes eucalypt woodland and Acacia shrubland.

== Behaviour ==
Adults may be heard from October to January, clinging in loose aggregations to the stems and branches of trees, uttering persistent, coarse, rattling and buzzing calls.
