= Illyria viridis =

Yidiyidi

Scientific classification
- Kingdom: Animalia
- Phylum: Arthropoda
- Class: Insecta
- Order: Hemiptera
- Suborder: Auchenorrhyncha
- Family: Cicadidae
- Genus: Illyria
- Species: I. viridis

Binomial name
- Illyria viridis Moulds & Marshall, 2022

Species of insect

Illyria viridis, the yidiyidi, is a species of singing cicada found in Western Australia. The genus Illyria was created in 1985 by Australian entomologist Maxwell Sydney Moulds. The yidiyidi was first described by Moulds and David C. Marshall in 2022. Prior to 2022, the genus consisted of only four cicada species for almost forty years.

== Etymology ==
The specific epithet viridis is the Latin adjective meaning green, and pertains to the insect's green colour. The local Wuggubun community call this cicada "yidiyidi".

== Distribution and habitat ==
Only a region within 150 kilometres of Kununurra, in the far northeastern region of Western Australia, is home to the yidiyidi. Adults inhabit tall grass, which grows near little water channels, typically in a mixture of both live and dead leaves. Adults start to appear after the first rains of December, and become locally widespread until at least mid-February.

== Description ==
The yidiyidi has a brown head, that becomes pale toward the eyes and is deepest around the ocelli, and it frequently has a pale green tint. The eyes themselves are pale tan. The postclypeus is brown and resembles the color of the ocelli, it darkens at the apex. The insect has a brown rostrum that becomes black at the tip as it reaches the bases of the hind coxae. The thorax is pale brown on the ventral side, and green dorsally. The pronotum frequently has a narrow black or dark brown fascia on either side of the midline, which together with the anterior pronotal margin and pronotal collar form an inverted keyhole shape. There are also frequently irregular black or brown markings along sutures that extend laterally next to the paranota and onto the pronotal collar lateral angles. Scutal depressions; black submedian and lateral sigilla on the mesonotum, with the latter occasionally reticulate.

The forewing is hyaline; costa is light yellowish to brown, frequently with hints of green; most other venation on the basal half also light yellowish brown, and black next to the basal membrane. The venation on the distal half of the wing is dark brown or black. The legs are yellowish brown to dark brown. The fore femora have small spines. The meracantha is dark brown basally and pale yellow distally. A large black suffusion covers the anterior distal half of the opercula, which are wide and rounded. The opercula are pale yellow. Sternum is golden brown to midbrown, but always lighter than tergites; abdomen with brown tergites, sometimes deeper or leaning toward black.

Both male and female yidiyidi measure around 16 mm in length (including the ovipositor for females). The length of the forewing averages 20.6 mm for the male, and 19.2 for the female. The head is around 5 mm wide and the pronotum is about 6 mm across.
