= Pancratium venkaiahii =

Scientific classification
- Kingdom: Plantae
- Clade: Embryophytes
- Clade: Tracheophytes
- Clade: Spermatophytes
- Clade: Angiosperms
- Clade: Monocots
- Order: Asparagales
- Family: Amaryllidaceae
- Subfamily: Amaryllidoideae
- Genus: Pancratium
- Species: P. venkaiahii

Binomial name
- Pancratium venkaiahii R.Prameela, J.Prak.Rao, S.B.Padal & M.Sankara Rao

Species of flowering plant

Pancratium venkaiahii is a species of plant of the family Amaryllidaceae described from Andhra Pradesh, India.

== Etymology ==
Species name was given in honor of Prof. Malleboena Venkaiah, Department of Botany, Andhra University.
