= Illyricus =

Illyricus may refer to:

- Bogumil Vošnjak (1882–1955), pseudonym Illyricus, a Slovene and Yugoslav jurist, politician, diplomat, author and legal historian
- Matthias Flacius Illyricus (1520–1575), a Lutheran reformer
- Pietro Gozze (1493–1564), called Doctor Illyricus, Ragusan Catholic prelate
- Saint Illyricus of Mount Myrsinon in the Peloponnesus (see April 3 (Eastern Orthodox liturgics))
- Thomas Illyricus (1484/5–1528/9), Dalmatian Franciscan theologian and preacher

== Species and subspecies ==
- Squalius illyricus, a ray-finned fish species
- Astragalus monspessulanus subsp. illyricus, a plant subspecies

== See also ==
- Illyricum (disambiguation)
- Illyrians (disambiguation)
- Illyrian (disambiguation)
- Illyria (disambiguation)
