= Illyria hilli =

Scientific classification
- Kingdom: Animalia
- Phylum: Arthropoda
- Clade: Pancrustacea
- Class: Insecta
- Order: Hemiptera
- Suborder: Auchenorrhyncha
- Family: Cicadidae
- Genus: Illyria
- Species: I. hilli

Binomial name
- Illyria hilli (Ashton, 1914)

Synonyms
- Tibicen hilli Ashton, 1914

Species of cicada

Illyria hilli, also known as the northern rattler, is a species of cicada in the true cicada family. It is endemic to Australia. It was described in 1914 by Australian entomologist Julian Howard Ashton.

== Description ==
The forewing length is 23–29 mm.

== Distribution and habitat ==
The species occurs from the western Top End of the Northern Territory, extending south to Daly Waters and west to the Ord River basin in far north-eastern Western Australia. The habitat includes tropical woodland.

== Behaviour ==
Adults may be heard from September to February, clinging to the stems, upper branches and trunks of small trees, uttering simple buzzing calls.
