= Illyrian =

Illyrian may refer to:

- Illyria, the historical region on the Balkan Peninsula
  - Illyrians, an ancient tribe inhabiting Illyria
  - Illyrian language, languages of ancient Illyrian tribes
- Illyricum (Roman province)
- Illyrian (South Slavic), a common name for 17th to 19th century South Slavic languages, the forerunner of Serbo-Croatian
- Illyrian movement, a cultural movement in 19th century Croatia
- Illyrian Provinces, a province of the First French Empire
- Kingdom of Illyria (1816–49), a crown land of Austria
- HD 82886, a star officially named Illyrian in Leo Minor
- Illyrians, a fictional winged faery race in A Court of Thorns and Roses series
- Illyrians, a fictional race of humanoids in the Star Trek franchise

== See also ==
- Illyria (disambiguation)
- Illyrians (disambiguation)
- Illyricum (disambiguation)
- Illyricus (disambiguation)
- Illyrian dog (disambiguation)
