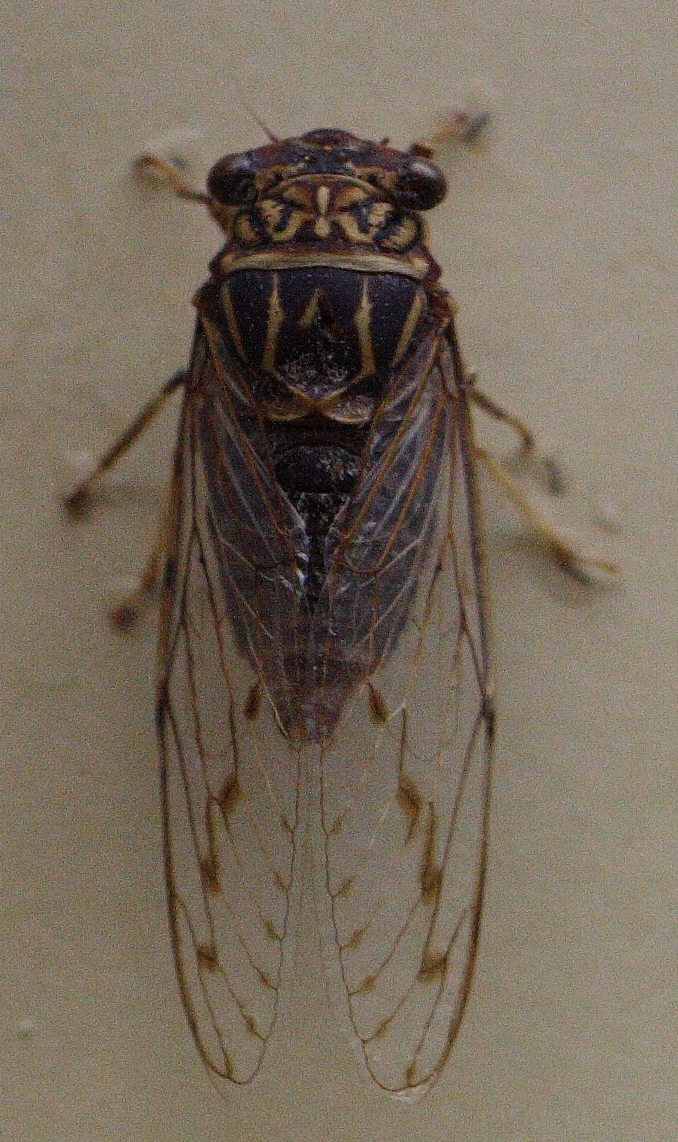

Scientific classification
- Kingdom: Animalia
- Phylum: Arthropoda
- Clade: Pancrustacea
- Class: Insecta
- Order: Hemiptera
- Suborder: Auchenorrhyncha
- Family: Cicadidae
- Genus: Illyria
- Species: I. burkei

Binomial name
- Illyria burkei (Distant, 1882)

Synonyms
- Tibicen burkei Distant, W.L. 1882

= Illyria burkei =

Species of cicada

Illyria burkei, also known as the monsoon rattler or eastern rattler, is a species or species complex of cicadas in the true cicada family. It is endemic to Australia. It was described in 1882 by English entomologist William Lucas Distant.

== Description ==
The forewing length is 24–36 mm.

== Distribution and habitat ==
The species occurs across northern Australia from the Kimberley region of north-western Western Australia, through the Top End of the Northern Territory, eastwards to northern and eastern Queensland. The habitat includes open eucalypt woodland and Acacia shrubland.

== Behaviour ==
Adults may be heard from November to January, clinging to branches and trunks, on which they may aggregate in large numbers, uttering persistent, coarse, loud, rattling and buzzing calls.
