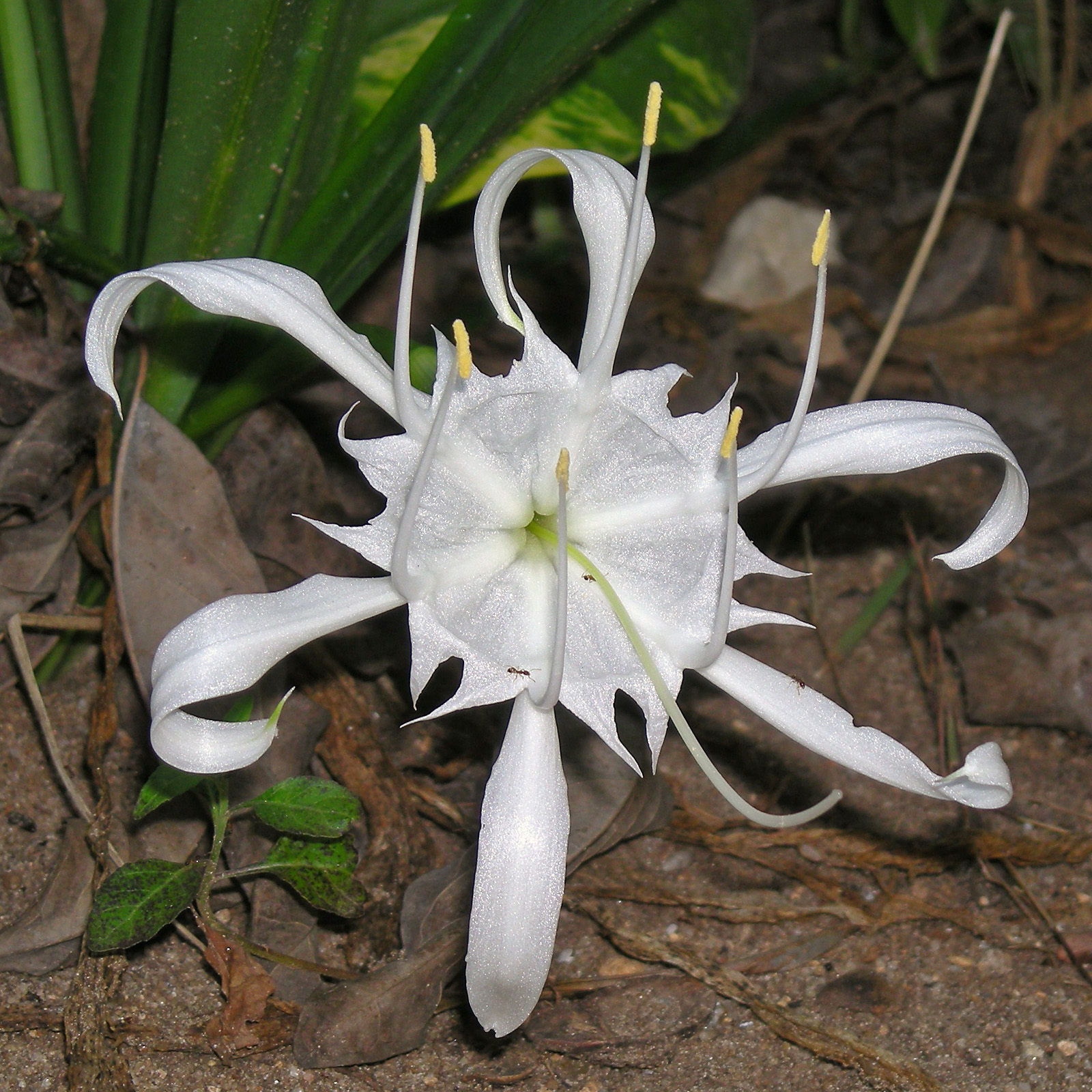

Scientific classification
- Kingdom: Plantae
- Clade: Embryophytes
- Clade: Tracheophytes
- Clade: Spermatophytes
- Clade: Angiosperms
- Clade: Monocots
- Order: Asparagales
- Family: Amaryllidaceae
- Subfamily: Amaryllidoideae
- Genus: Pancratium
- Species: P. zeylanicum

Binomial name
- Pancratium zeylanicum L.

= Pancratium zeylanicum =

Species of flowering plant

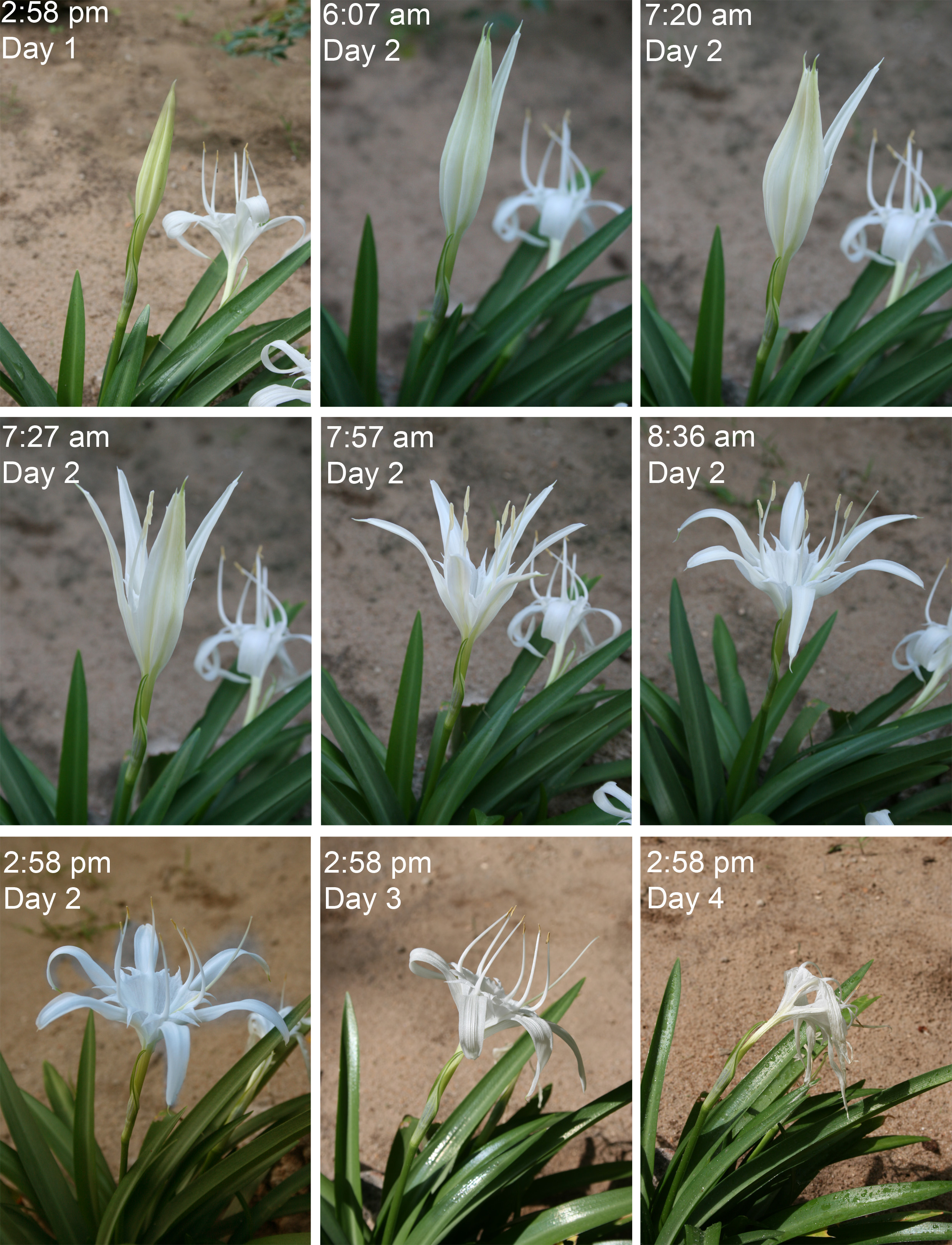
Floral stages over a period of 4 days. See image page for more details

Pancratium zeylanicum, commonly known as the Javanese lily is a bulbous perennial herb native to Borneo, Java, the Maluku Islands, Sulawesi, India, Sri Lanka, the Maldives, the Laccadive Islands, and the Philippines.

It is sometimes grown as a hothouse container plant. It does not have a rest period unless water is withheld. It propagates by producing offsets and seed.

The pollinator is a moth with a very long proboscis. Flowers are white with narrow tepals and long teeth along the margin of the staminal corona.
