= Illyria major =

Scientific classification
- Kingdom: Animalia
- Phylum: Arthropoda
- Clade: Pancrustacea
- Class: Insecta
- Order: Hemiptera
- Suborder: Auchenorrhyncha
- Family: Cicadidae
- Genus: Illyria
- Species: I. major

Binomial name
- Illyria major Moulds, 1985

Species of cicada

Illyria major, also known as the desert rattler, is a species of cicada in the true cicada family. It is endemic to Australia.

== Description ==
The forewing length is 31–37 mm.

== Distribution and habitat ==
The species occurs in arid regions of northern Western Australia from Shark Bay, eastwards through the central Northern Territory to Mount Isa in north-western Queensland. The habitat includes open Acacia shrubland.

== Behaviour ==
Adults cling to the stems of shrubs and small trees, uttering loud, penetrating, rattling calls.
