= Illyrians (disambiguation) =

Illyrians may refer to:

- Ancient Illyrians in southeastern Europe
- Population of ancient Illyria
- Population of Roman Illyricum
- Population of French Illyrian Provinces
- Population of Austrian Kingdom of Illyria
- Followers of the Illyrian movement in the first half of the 19th century

== Arts and entertainment ==
- Illyrians, a fictional race of humanoids, including the character Una Chin-Riley, in the Star Trek franchise

== See also ==
- Illyria (disambiguation)
- Illyrian (disambiguation)
- Illyricum (disambiguation)
- Illyricus (disambiguation)
