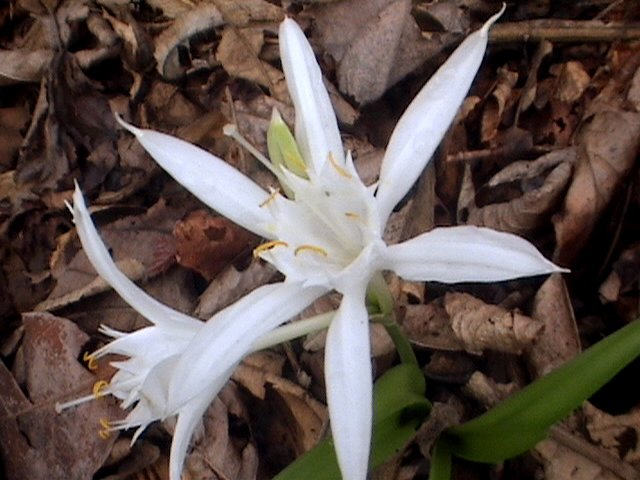

Scientific classification
- Kingdom: Plantae
- Clade: Embryophytes
- Clade: Tracheophytes
- Clade: Spermatophytes
- Clade: Angiosperms
- Clade: Monocots
- Order: Asparagales
- Family: Amaryllidaceae
- Subfamily: Amaryllidoideae
- Genus: Pancratium
- Species: P. parvum

Binomial name
- Pancratium parvum Dalzell

= Pancratium parvum =

Rain flower

Species of flowering plant

Pancratium parvum is a bulbous ephemeral plant found in India. Flowering season is May–June.

This herb can be 30–50 cm tall, bulb 4–5 cm. Leaves 30–45 cm, linear Flowers fragrant, 3-8 in umbel on slender scape 15–25 cm long; bracts 2, 5 cm, greenish white. Filaments long; flowers opening at night. Fruits 2 cm, globose, 3 lobed. Occasionally found on cliffs in evergreen forest, semi-evergreen, moist deciduous forest. The parvum has a bulb with neck and short stamens.
