= Pancratium foetidum =

Scientific classification
- Kingdom: Plantae
- Clade: Embryophytes
- Clade: Tracheophytes
- Clade: Spermatophytes
- Clade: Angiosperms
- Clade: Monocots
- Order: Asparagales
- Family: Amaryllidaceae
- Subfamily: Amaryllidoideae
- Genus: Pancratium
- Species: P. foetidum

Binomial name
- Pancratium foetidum Pomel

Synonyms
- Pancratium collinum

Species of plant

Pancratium foetidum is a species of plant in the family Amaryllidaceae.

== Sources ==
This article incorporates text from a free content work. Licensed under CC0 (license statement/permission). Text taken from Pancratium foetidum. Encyclopedia of Life.
