= Illyria australensis =

Scientific classification
- Kingdom: Animalia
- Phylum: Arthropoda
- Clade: Pancrustacea
- Class: Insecta
- Order: Hemiptera
- Suborder: Auchenorrhyncha
- Family: Cicadidae
- Genus: Illyria
- Species: I. australensis

Binomial name
- Illyria australensis (Kirkaldy, 1909)

Synonyms
- Tettigia australensis Kirkaldy, 1909

Species of cicada

Illyria australensis, also known as the semi-arid rattler, is a species of cicada in the true cicada family. It is endemic to Australia. It was described in 1909 by English entomologist George Willis Kirkaldy.

== Description ==
The forewing length is 20–23 mm.

== Distribution and habitat ==
The species occurs from coastal north-western Western Australia, between Cygnet Bay and Port Hedland, eastwards to Daly Waters in the Northern Territory. The habitat is low open woodland.

== Behaviour ==
Adults have been heard from December to February, clinging to the branches and trunks of small trees, uttering metallic, buzzing calls.
