= Illyria (cicada) =

Scientific classification
- Kingdom: Animalia
- Phylum: Arthropoda
- Clade: Pancrustacea
- Class: Insecta
- Order: Hemiptera
- Suborder: Auchenorrhyncha
- Family: Cicadidae
- Genus: Illyria; Moulds, 1985

Genus of true bugs

Illyria is a genus of cicadas, also known as rattlers, in the family Cicadidae and tribe Macrotristriini.

== Species ==
As of 2025 there were six described species:

- Illyria australensis (Kirkaldy, 1909) (Semi-arid Rattler)
- Illyria burkei (Distant, 1882) (Rattler)
- Illyria hilli (Ashton, 1914) (Northern Rattler)
- Illyria ignis (Emery, Emery and Ong, 2022) (Kimberley Rattler)
- Illyria major Moulds, 1985 (Desert Rattler)
- Illyria viridis Moulds, 2022 (Green Rattler)
