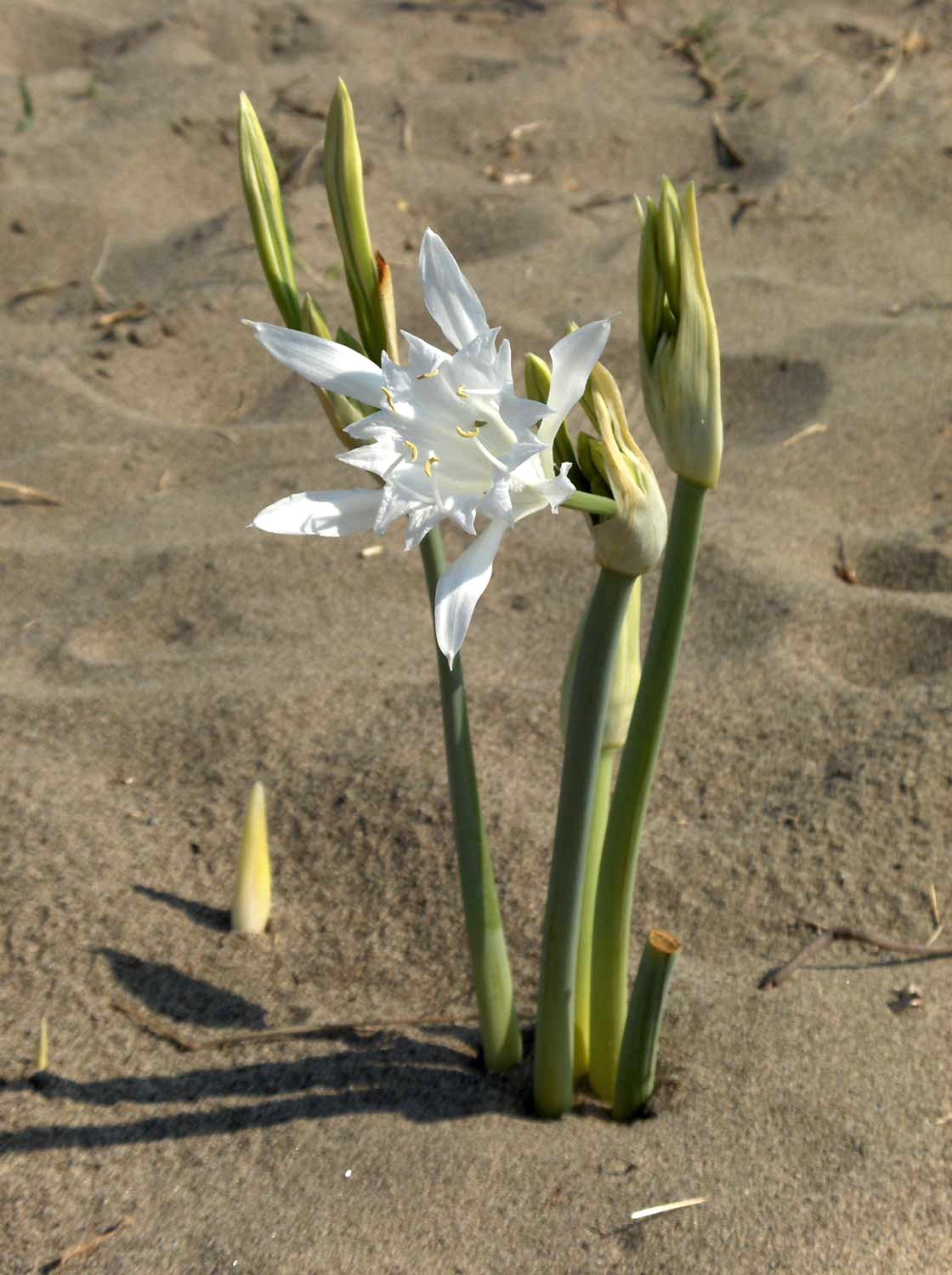

Conservation status
- Least Concern (IUCN 3.1)

Scientific classification
- Kingdom: Plantae
- Clade: Embryophytes
- Clade: Tracheophytes
- Clade: Angiosperms
- Clade: Monocots
- Order: Asparagales
- Family: Amaryllidaceae
- Subfamily: Amaryllidoideae
- Genus: Pancratium
- Species: P. maritimum

Binomial name
- Pancratium maritimum L.

Synonyms
- Hymenocallis maritima (L.) M.Roem.; Pancratium carolinianum L.; Hymenocallis caroliniana (L.) Herb.; Hymenocallis lacera Salisb., nom illeg. superfl.; Hymenocallis ruizii M.Roem.; Pancratium abchasicum Regel; Pancratium aegyptiacum M.Roem.; Pancratium angustifolium M. Roem.; Pancratium angustifolium Lojac. 1909, illegitimate homonym, not M.Roem. 1847; Pancratium barcinonense Sennen; Pancratium linosae Soldano & F.Conti; Pancratium mirennae Mattei; Scilla parva Garsault; Pancratium maritimum var. aureum Pynaert

= Pancratium maritimum =

Sea daffodil

Species of plant

Pancratium maritimum, or sea daffodil, is a species of bulbous plant native to both sides of the Mediterranean region and the Black Sea, from the Canary Islands, Portugal, Morocco, and Cyprus, and east to Turkey, Syria, Israel and the Caucasus. Its range on the coasts of the Black Sea includes southern Bulgaria, northern Turkey and Georgia. The species is naturalized in Southern California.

Pancratium maritimum grows on beaches and coastal sand dunes, often with much of the leaves and scapes buried in the sand. Other vernacular names are sea lily, sand daffodil, sand lily and lily of St. Nicholas, (although it is not a true lily). The specific epithet maritimum means "of the sea".

== Description ==
Pancratium maritimum is a bulbous perennial with a long neck and glaucous, broadly linear leaves, evergreen, but the leaves often die back during hot summers. Scape to 40 centimetres (16 in). Flowers 3–15 in an umbel, up to 15 cm (6 in) long, white. Corona two-thirds as long as the tepals. The flowers have a pleasing, exotic and very subtle lily scent, which only becomes apparent during still, windless summer nights that allow the delicate fragrance to become perceptible. Flowering is from August to October.

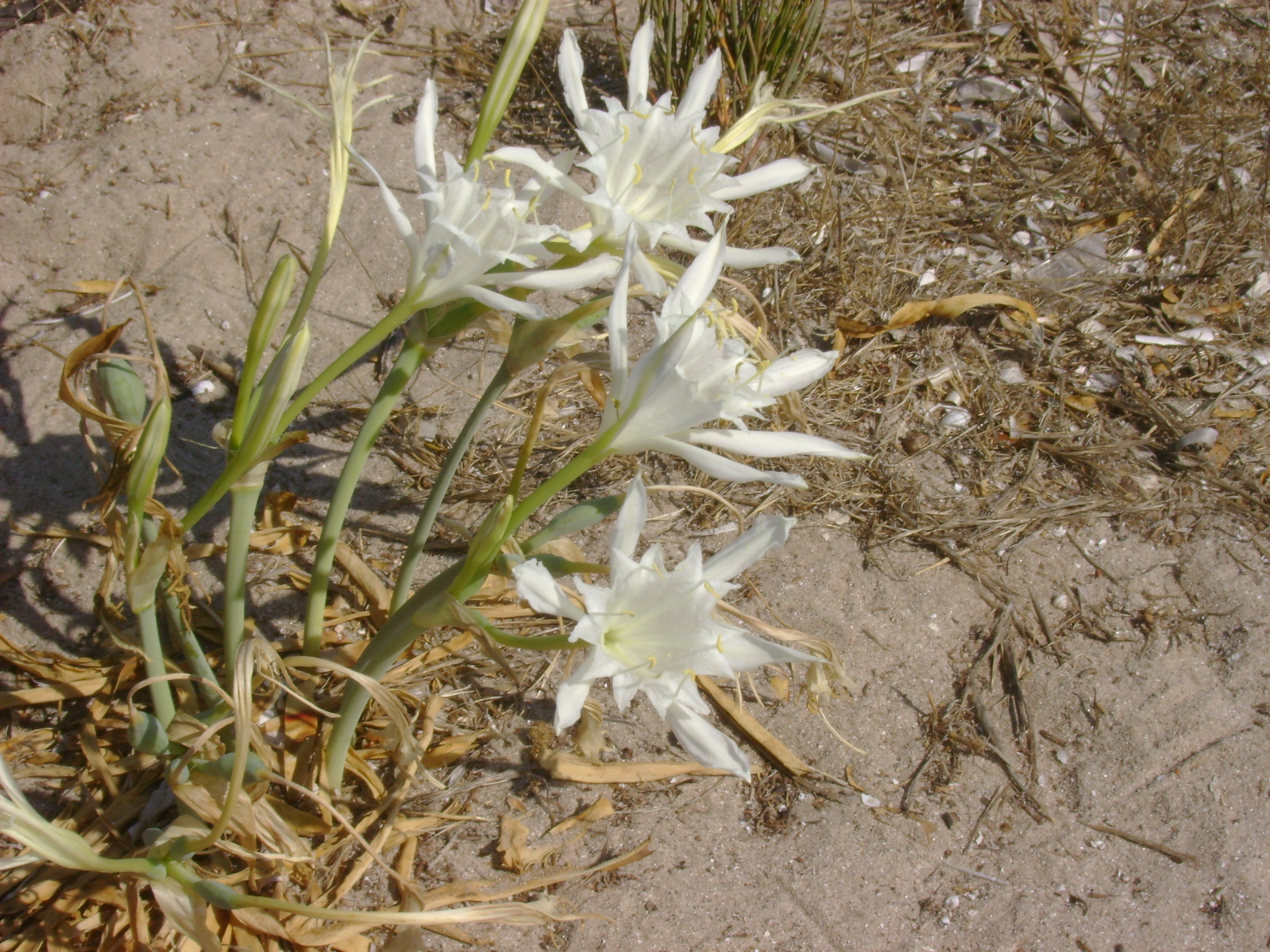
Group of flowers on the Sardinian coast

=== Chemistry ===
4'-Hydroxy-5,7-dimethoxy-8-methylflavan is a flavan found in P. maritimum.

== Ecology ==
Pancratium maritimum is pollinated by a hawk-moth named Agrius convolvuli. These insects visit the flower only when the speed of the wind is under 2 metres per second (6.6 ft/s). Even if the species is pollinated in an artificial way during windy weather the pollination is not effective. Pancratium maritimum is not receptive to its own pollen and must be cross-pollinated.

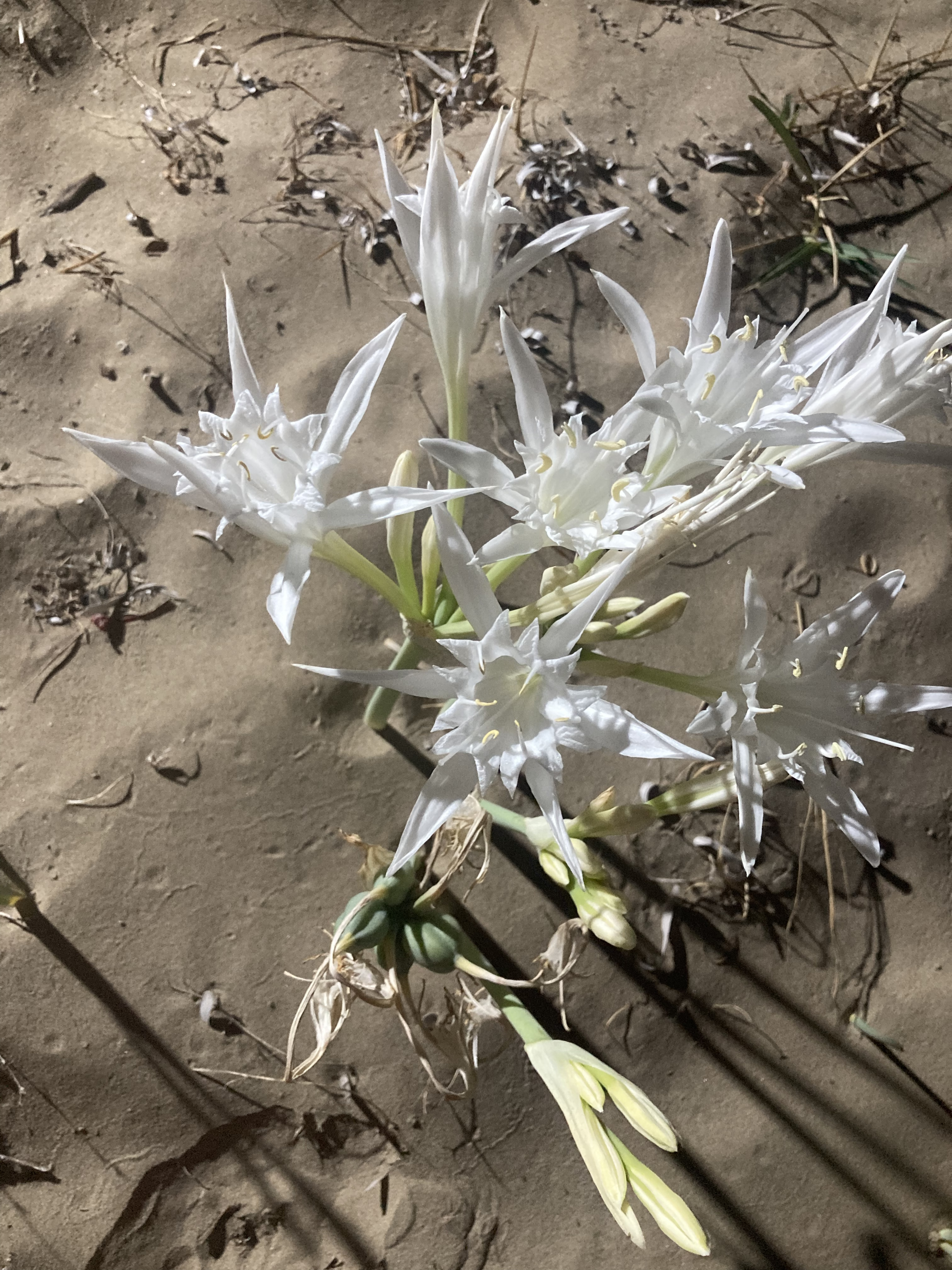
Pancratium maritimum cluster with seed pods in Corfu.

== Cultivation ==
Easily grown but requires a very sunny position and a very well drained, sandy soil. Needs hot summers to induce flowering and is often a shy bloomer in cooler climates. Hardy to USDA zone 8. Tolerates temperatures down to about −5 °C (23 °F). Propagation by seeds or division after flowering. Seedlings may flower in their third or fourth year.

== Culture ==
The Hebrew name for the flower is חבצלת החוף (khavatselet ha-Khof), closely related to the rose of Sharon (khavatselet ha-Sharon – חבצלת השרון) mentioned in the Song of Solomon. Since the plant grows on the Sharon plain of the coast of the Mediterranean Sea, it is suggested the biblical passage may refer to this flower.

== See also ==
- List of plants known as lily

== Other sources ==
- Boulos, L. (1995). Flora of Egypt Checklist: i-xii, 1-287. Al Hadara Publishing, Cairo.
- Boulos, L. (2005). Flora of Egypt 4: 1-617. Al Hadara Publishing, Cairo.
- Britton, N. (1918). Flora of Bermuda: 1-585. Charles Scribner's Sons, New York.
- Czerepanov, S.K. (1995). Vascular Plants of Russia and Adjacent States (The Former USSR): 1-516. Cambridge University Press.
- Danin, A. (2004). Distribution Atlas of Plants in the Flora Palaestina area: 1-517. The Israel Academy of Sciences and Humanities, Jerusalem.
- Davis, P.H. (ed.) (1984). Flora of Turkey and the East Aegean Islands 8: 1-632. Edinburgh University Press, Edinburgh.
- Dobignard, D. & Chatelain, C. (2010). Index synonymique de la flore d'Afrique du nord 1: 1-455. Éditions des conservatoire et jardin botaniques, Genève.
- Hansen, A. & Sunding, P. (1985). Flora of Macaronesia. Checklist of vascular plants. 3. revised edition. Sommerfeltia 1: 5-103.
- Jafri, S.M.H. & El-Gadi, A. (eds.) (1978). Flora of Libya 51: 1-10. Al-Faateh University, Tripoli.
- Maire, R. (1960). Flore de l'Afrique du Nord 6: 1-397. Paul Lechevalier, Paris.
- Meikle, R.D. (1985). Flora of Cyprus 2: 833-1970. The Bentham-Moxon Trust Royal Botanic Gardens, Kew.
- Polunin, Oleg (1987). Flowers of Greece and the Balkans – a Field Guide. Oxford University Press. ISBN 0-19-281998-4.
- Phillips, R. & M. Rix (1989). Bulbs. Pan Books. ISBN 0-330-30253-1.
- Tutin, T.G. et al. (eds.) (1980). Flora Europaea 5: 1-452. Cambridge University Press.
- Zervous, S., Raus, T. & Yannitsaros, A. (2009). Additions to the flora of the island of Kalimnos (SE Aegean, Greece). Willdenowia 39: 165-177.
