= 1160 Illyria =

Main-belt asteroid

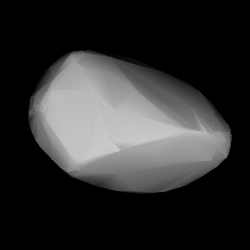
- Modelled shape of Illyria from its lightcurve

Discovery
- Discovered by: K. Reinmuth
- Discovery site: Heidelberg Obs.
- Discovery date: 9 September 1929

Designations
- Pronunciation: /ɪˈlɪriə/
- Named after: Illyria (region on the Balkans)
- Alternative designations: 1929 RL · 1962 WA
- Minor planet category: main-belt · (middle); Eunomia · Maria

Orbital characteristics
- Epoch 4 September 2017 (JD 2458000.5)
- Uncertainty parameter 0
- Observation arc: 87.73 yr (32,045 days)
- Aphelion: 2.8628 AU
- Perihelion: 2.2591 AU
- Semi-major axis: 2.5610 AU
- Eccentricity: 0.1179
- Orbital period (sidereal): 4.10 yr (1,497 days)
- Mean anomaly: 166.36°
- Mean motion: 0° 14^{m} 25.8^{s} / day
- Inclination: 14.963°
- Longitude of ascending node: 3.7920°
- Argument of perihelion: 4.6994°

Physical characteristics
- Dimensions: 12.73±1.07 km 13.85±0.49 km 13.88 km (calculated); 13.977±0.227 km 14.767±0.219 km
- Synodic rotation period: 4.1025±0.0002 h 4.10295±0.00005 h 4.104±0.001 h 4.3±0.3 h (poor)
- Geometric albedo: 0.21 (assumed); 0.2242±0.0366; 0.249±0.014; 0.291±0.312; 0.349±0.028
- Spectral type: S (assumed)
- Absolute magnitude (H): 11.10 · 11.16±0.38 · 11.4 · 11.43 · 11.6

1160 Illyria, provisional designation 1929 RL, is a stony Maria asteroid from the central regions of the asteroid belt, approximately 13 kilometers in diameter. It was discovered on 9 September 1929, by German astronomer Karl Reinmuth at the Heidelberg Observatory in southwest Germany. The asteroid was named after the ancient region of Illyria, located on the Balkan Peninsula.

== Orbit and classification ==
Based on the Hierarchical Clustering Method, which uses a body's proper orbital elements, Illyria is a member of the Maria family (506), a large intermediate belt family of stony asteroids. It has also been grouped into the Eunomia family (502), an even larger family with more than 5,000 known members.

Illyria orbits the Sun in the central asteroid belt at a distance of 2.3–2.9 AU once every 4 years and 1 month (1,497 days; semi-major axis of 2.56 AU). Its orbit has an eccentricity of 0.12 and an inclination of 15° with respect to the ecliptic. The body's observation arc begins with a recovery observation at Lowell Observatory in October 1929, three weeks after its official discovery observation at Heidelberg.

== Physical characteristics ==
Illyria is an assumed stony S-type asteroid, which agrees with the overall spectral type of both the Maria and Eunomia family.

=== Rotation period ===
Several rotational lightcurves of Illyria have been obtained from photometric observations since 2007. Lightcurve analysis gave a consolidated rotation period of 4.1025 hours with a brightness amplitude between 0.56 and 0.91 magnitude (U=3).

=== Spin axis ===
In 2013, an international study also modeled the asteroid's lightcurve from photometric data. It gave a concurring period of 4.10295 hours and determined a partial spin axis of (n.a., 47.0°) in ecliptic coordinates (λ, β).

=== Diameter and albedo ===
According to the surveys carried out by the Japanese Akari satellite and the NEOWISE mission of NASA's Wide-field Infrared Survey Explorer, Illyria measures between 12.73 and 14.767 kilometers in diameter and its surface has an albedo between 0.2242 and 0.349.

The Collaborative Asteroid Lightcurve Link assumes an albedo of 0.21, derived from the parent body of the Eunomia family, and calculates a diameter of 13.88 kilometers based on an absolute magnitude of 11.6.

== Naming ==
This minor planet was named after Illyria, an ancient region on the Balkans which borders the Adriatic Sea. The official naming citation was mentioned in The Names of the Minor Planets by Paul Herget in 1955 (H 108).
