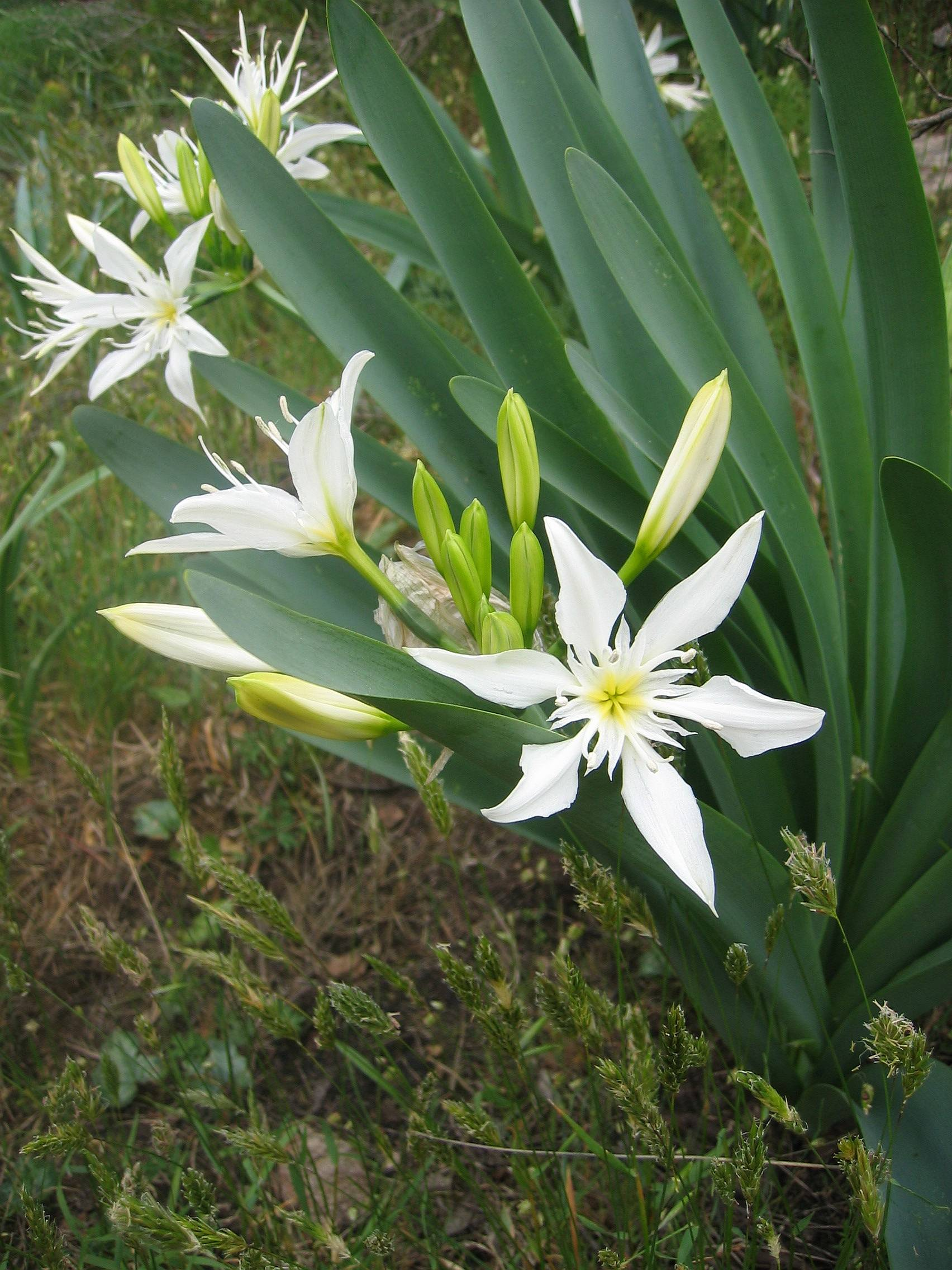

Scientific classification
- Kingdom: Plantae
- Clade: Embryophytes
- Clade: Tracheophytes
- Clade: Spermatophytes
- Clade: Angiosperms
- Clade: Monocots
- Order: Asparagales
- Family: Amaryllidaceae
- Subfamily: Amaryllidoideae
- Genus: Pancratium
- Species: P. illyricum

Binomial name
- Pancratium illyricum L.

Synonyms
- Halmyra stellaris Parl.; Pancratium stellare Salisb. Zouchia illyrica (L.) Raf.

= Pancratium illyricum =

Illyrian sea lily Giglio marino di Sardegna

Species of flowering plant

Pancratium illyricum is a species of bulbous plant native to Corsica, Sardinia and the Capraia Islands of Tuscany.

Pancratium illyricum grows on rocky slopes and sparse woodland areas, from sea level to more than 1300 m above sea level. It is a bulbous perennial with glaucous leaves, 30–60 cm long, 1½–½ cm wide. Leaves wither after flowering time in early summer, and the plant goes dormant. The scape is up to 45 cm long, and the flowers are clustered in umbels of about 12, and are white with a short corona and very fragrant. Flowers appear in April to June.

== Etymology ==
The specific epithet illyricum means "from Illyria", a region in the western Balkans. It is not well suited as the plant does not grow there. The Italian name is "giglio stella" = star lily.

== Cultivation ==
Easy to grow and flowers freely if planted near a south facing wall. Slow to increase. It is the hardiest Pancratium - USDA zone 8 and probably 7 in sheltered position with a southern aspect. Full sun in cooler climates, otherwise light shade. Propagation by seeds or division.

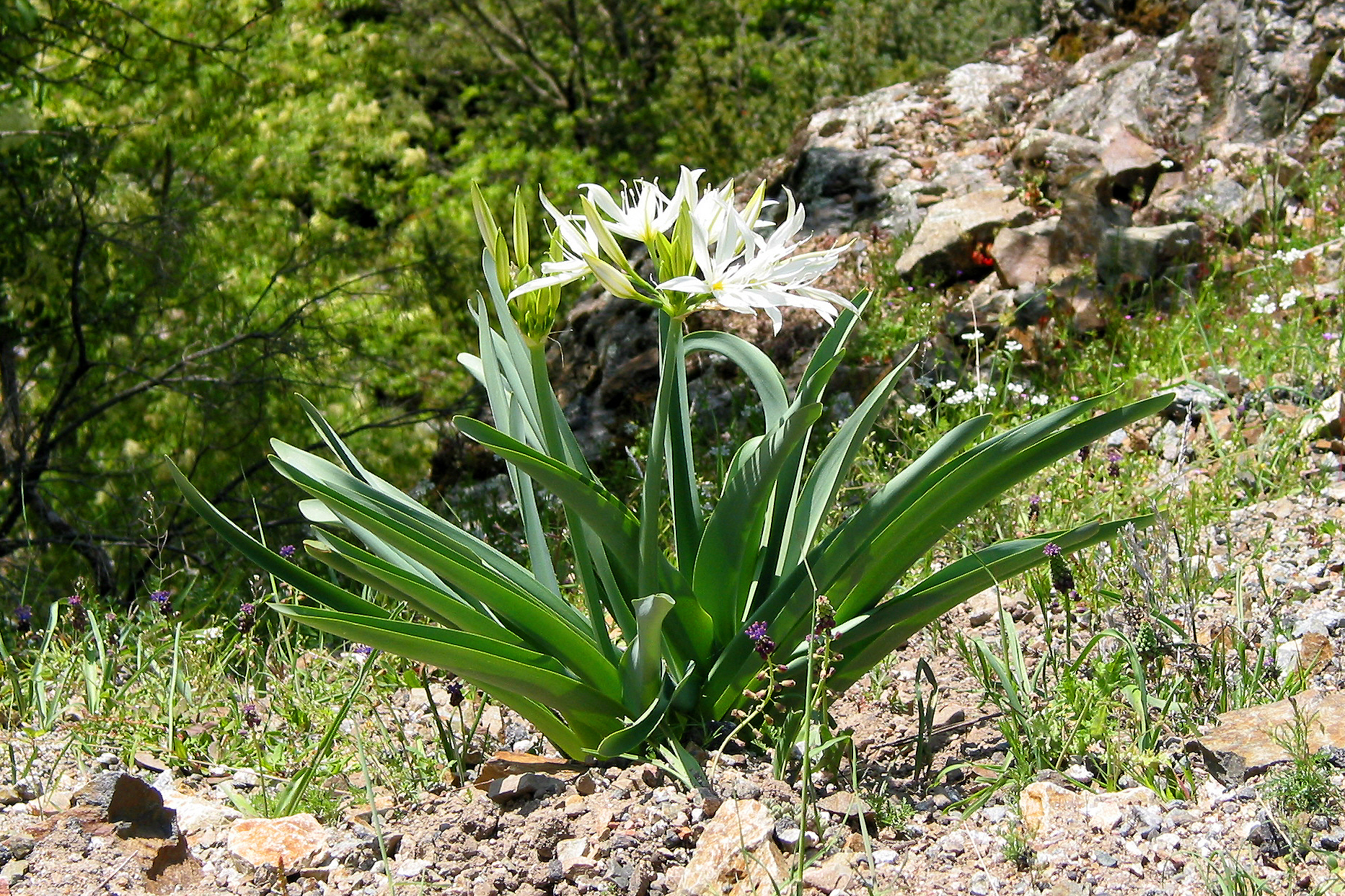
Pancratium illyricum in Tolla (Corsica).
