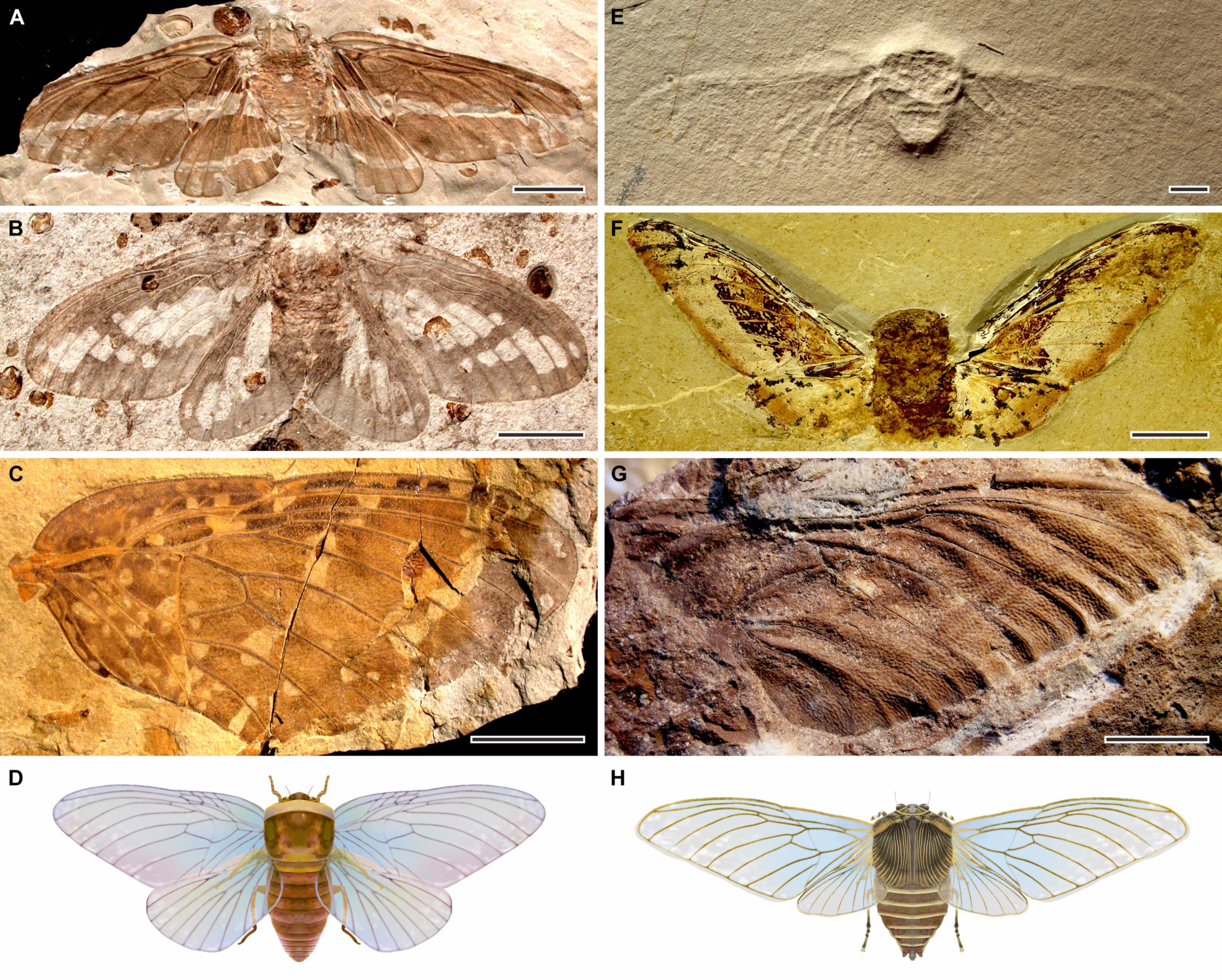
- Gallery of various palaeontinids

Scientific classification
- Kingdom: Animalia
- Phylum: Arthropoda
- Clade: Pancrustacea
- Class: Insecta
- Order: Hemiptera
- Suborder: Auchenorrhyncha
- Infraorder: Cicadomorpha
- Superfamily: †Palaeontinoidea
- Family: †Palaeontinidae; Handlirsch, 1906

Type genus
- †Palaeontina Butler, 1873

Genera
- See text

Synonyms
- †CicadomorphidaeEvans, 1956

= Palaeontinidae =

Palaeontinidae Temporal range: Late Triassic-Early Cretaceous Norian–Aptian

Extinct family of true bugs

Palaeontinidae, commonly known as giant cicadas, is an extinct family of cicadomorphs. They existed from the Late Triassic to the Early Cretaceous. The family contains around 30 to 40 genera and around a hundred species. They are thought to have had a similar ecology to modern cicadas as feeders on plant xylem fluids. Despite being described as "giant cicadas" (with the wingspan of some species exceeding 15 centimetres (5.9 in)), they are not particularly closely related to true cicadas.

== Discovery ==
The first palaeontinid discovered was Palaeontina oolitica. It consisted of a single forewing collected from the Taynton Limestone Formation (Stonesfield Slate) of Oxfordshire, England by the English natural historian Edward Charlesworth. It was first described in 1873 by the English entomologist Arthur Gardiner Butler in his book Lepidoptera Exotica; or, Descriptions and Illustrations of Exotic Lepidoptera. Butler claimed that it was the oldest butterfly ever recovered, having mistakenly identified it as a butterfly of the family Nymphalidae.

== Description and paleobiology ==
Palaeontinids had large bodies (about 15 cm long) covered with bristles (setae). They had small heads and broad wings, superficially resembling moths. Large palaeontinids like Colossocossus had forewings that reached the length of 57 to 71 mm (2.2 to 2.8 in). They possessed an inflated frons and a long rostrum (piercing and sucking mouthpart), indicating that they fed on xylem fluids like some other modern hemipterans, including living cicadas to which they have often been compared.

Some authors have proposed that the host plants of palaeontinids to be ginkgophytes based on the geographic distribution of both groups; however, other authors have argued that this association is likely to be spurious, given that paleontinids also occur in areas with no ginkgophytes. Some authors have suggested that the decline of gymnosperms and the rise of angiosperms (flowering plants) during the Cretaceous could have been a factor in their extinction. Numerous newly evolved insectivorous animals (feathered theropods, primitive mammals, and early birds) may have also contributed significantly to their extinction.

Most species of palaeontinids exhibit cryptic coloration. The patterns on their wings protected them as they perched on branches and fed on sap. They may also have served as secondary sexual characteristics. The color patterns can vary slightly within the same species. Triassic palaeontinids possessed large eyespots on their forewings — features absent in later members — whereas the wings of many Jurassic and few Cretaceous species bear dark transverse bands. The variations and subsequent disappearance of such dark patterns are likely related to the evolving visual perception of reptilian and avian predators.

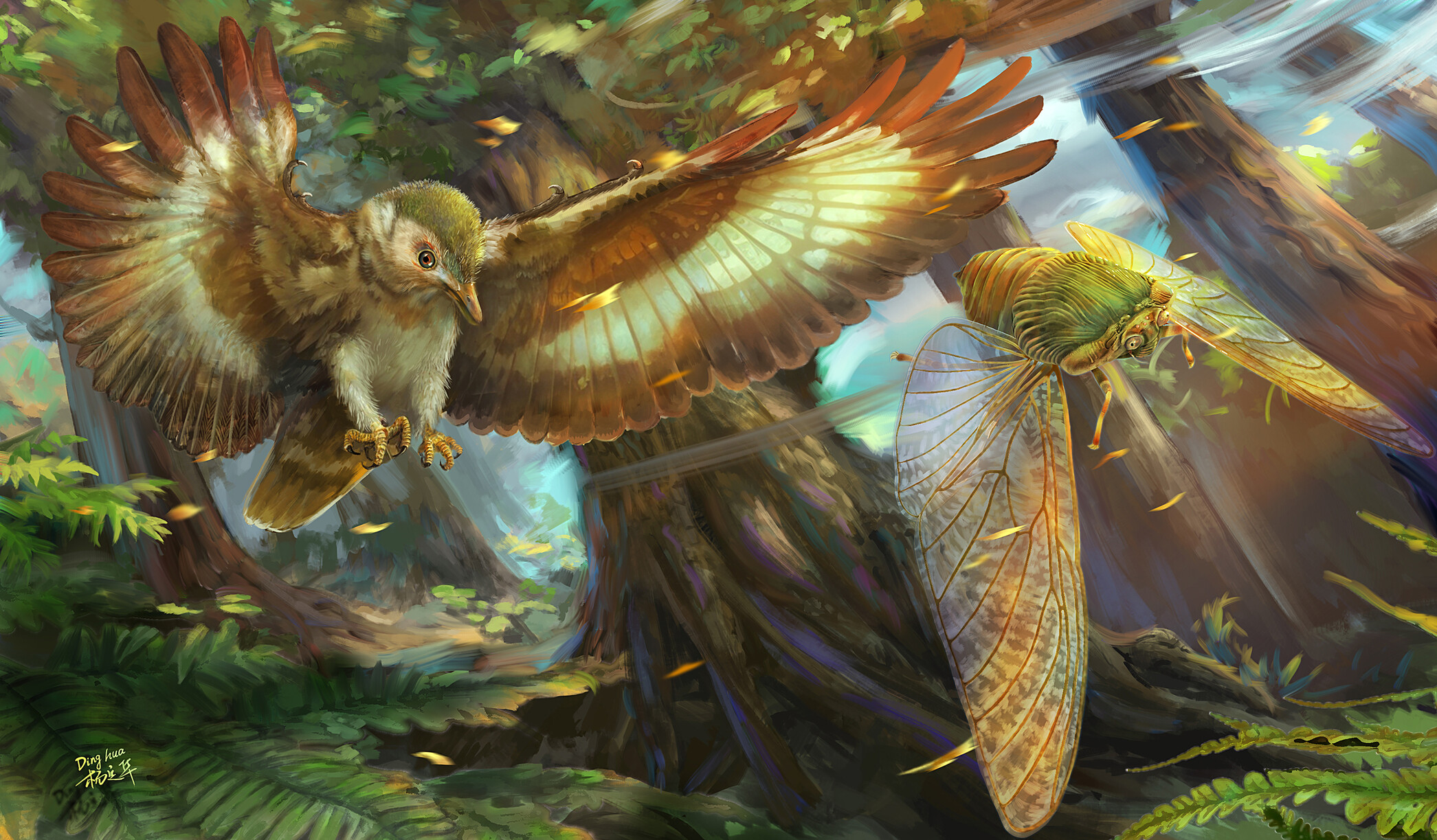
Illustration of a palaeontinid being pursued by a primitive bird during the Early Cretaceous

Palaeontinids, like modern cicadas, possess four membranous wings supported by veins. The length and width ratio of the wings can vary within the same species, sometimes as a result of fossil preservation. Early Jurassic palaeontinids, like Suljuktocossus, exhibit the most primitive wing forms in the family. The forewing was elliptical with the "nodal line" (the area where the wing bends during flight, also known as the "transverse flexion line") more or less dissecting through the center of the wing. The hindwing was short and broad. The bases of the forewings overlapped that of the hindwings like in modern butterflies. Taken together with their large bodies, these characteristics indicate that they were fast but moderately versatile fliers.

In contrast, later palaeontinids like the Upper Jurassic Eocicada and Early Cretaceous Ilerdocossus had triangular forewings with the flexion line closer to the base. They had smaller and narrower hindwings that did not overlap with the forewing. These indicate that they were highly versatile fliers, able to fly with a wide range of speeds and agility like modern wasps and sphinx moths. They also possessed changes to the leading edge of their forewings, suggesting an overall gain in lift. The different wing shape of later palaeontinids may have evolved to more effectively escape from flying predators like early birds.

The trend of forewing elongation is most evident in members of the family Mesogereonidae, an early offshoot and close relatives of palaeontinids.

== Classification ==
Early Jurassic palaeontinids

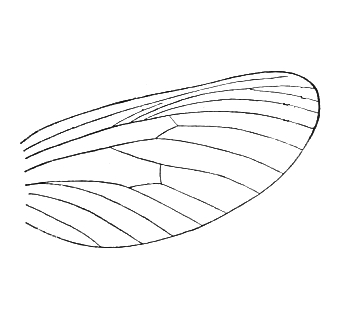
Palaeontina oolitica
(forewing)

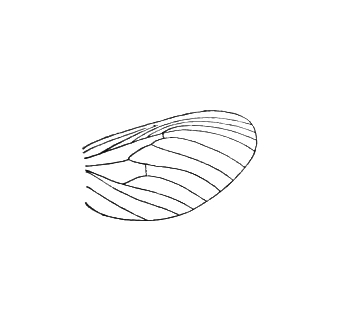
Palaeocossus jurassicus
(forewing)

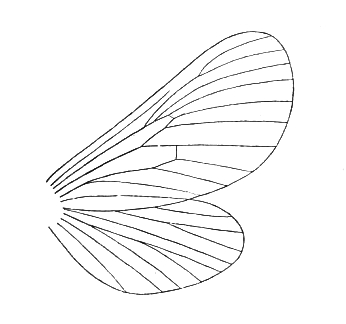
Prolystra lithographica

Late Jurassic palaeontinids

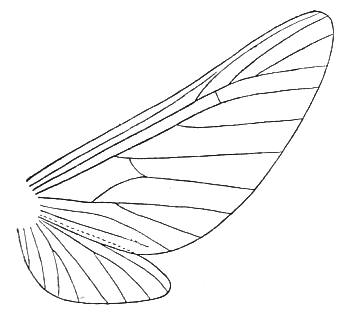
Eocicada lameerei

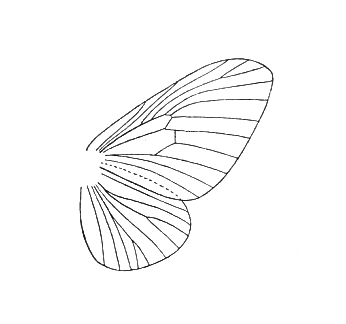
Limacodites mesozoicus

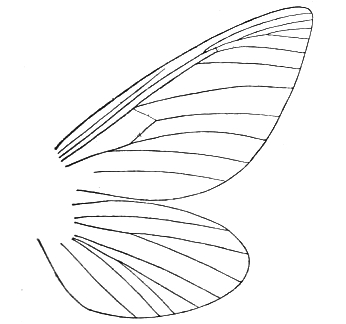
Beloptesis oppenheimi

The family was first erected by the Austrian entomologist Anton Handlirsch in 1908. Like Butler, Handlirsch insisted that palaeontinids were members of lepidopteran Heteroneura (butterflies and moths). Palaeontinids were then only known mostly from poorly preserved specimens like Palaeontina and Eocicada. He claimed they were related to the extant family Limacodidae (slug moths). The English entomologist Edward Meyrick supported the lepidopteran conclusion, though he believed they belonged to the family Hepialidae (ghost moths) instead. He said "There is little doubt that it [i.e. Palaeontina oolitica] belongs to the Hepialidae."

The Belgian entomologist Auguste Lameere challenged this conclusion, claiming palaeontinids were more closely related to the extant family Cicadidae (cicadas). The English-Australian entomologist and geologist Robert John Tillyard supported Lameere's conclusion, noting that the wings of palaeontinid fossils lacked the characteristic scales of lepidopterans but instead had tubercules, pits, and cross-ridges like those found in modern cicadas. He also cited characteristics of wing venation that distinctly differs from that of lepidopterans.

Palaeontinidae are currently classified under the extinct superfamily Palaeontinoidea along with the families Dunstaniidae and Mesogereonidae. They are classified under infraorder Cicadomorpha of the hemipterans (true bugs). Despite being described as "giant cicadas", other living cicadomorphs (leafhoppers, treehoppers, and spittlebugs) are more closely related to modern cicadas than palaeontinids are.

The name Cicadomorphidae was once proposed as a replacement for the name Palaeontinidae in 1956 by the Australian entomologist J.W. Evans. This was because of Handlirsch's earlier insistence that the type species Palaeontina oolitica may not have been Hemipteran. However, Evans later conceded that retaining the name Palaeontinidae was preferable as the drawings Handlirsch based his conclusions on were from badly preserved specimens.

== Evolution ==
Riek (1976) originally considered Palaeontinoidea to be the descendants of the family Cicadoprosbolidae (currently known as the family Tettigarctidae), insects believed to be transitional between the ancestral cicada-like family Prosbolidae and the modern family Cicadidae.

Wang et al (2009), however, notes that palaeontinoids more closely resemble prosbolids in agreement with earlier studies by Wootton (1971), Shcherbakov (1984), and Shcherbakov and Popov (2002). They conclude that palaeontinoids descended directly from the family Prosbolidae rather than from tettigarctids. Modern cicadas therefore, did not descend directly from Palaeontinidae.

Within Palaeontinoidea, the family Dunstaniidae (Upper Permian to Lower Jurassic of Australia, South Africa, and China) is ancestral to palaeontinids. Both are distinct from the only other member of the superfamily, the more primitive and specialized family Mesogereonidae (Upper Triassic of Australia and South Africa).

== Distribution and geologic time range ==
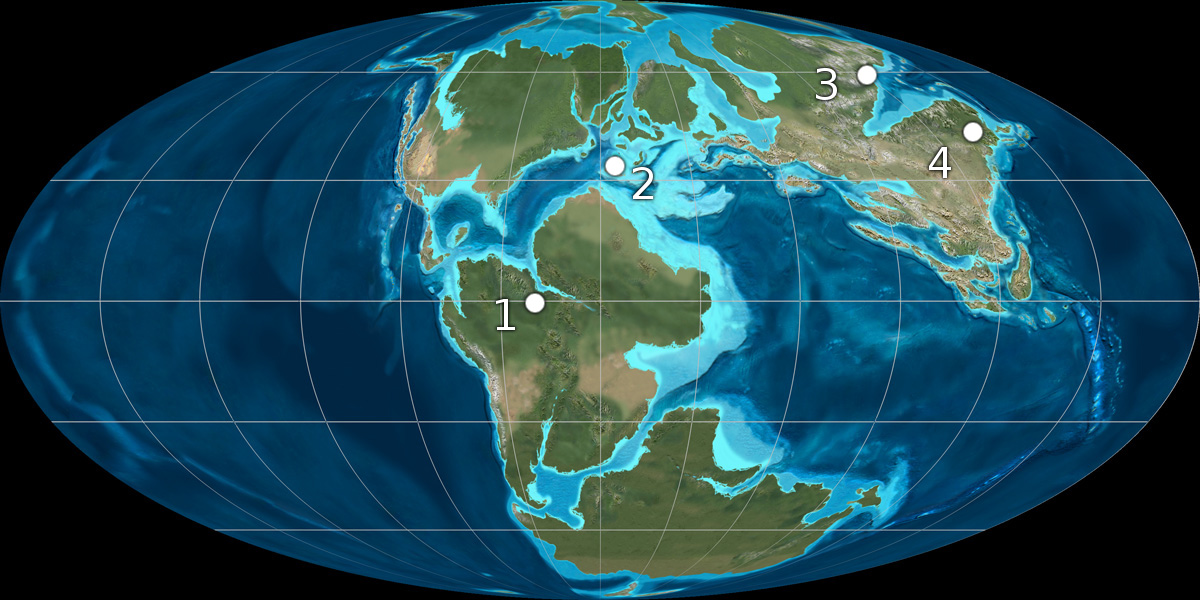
Paleogeographic representation of the Earth during the Early Cretaceous showing the approximate locations of some palaeontinid fossil sites. 1 - Crato Formation, Brazil; 2 - Serra del Montsec, Spain; 3 - Baissa, Transbaikalia; and 4 - Yixian Formation, China.

The oldest known member of the group is Hallakkungis from South Korea, dating to the Norian stage of the Late Triassic (ca. 227 – ca. 208.5 Mya), and the youngest members are from the late Aptian age of the Lower Cretaceous (~115-113 Mya). They achieved their greatest diversity during the Jurassic period.

Palaeontinid fossils are abundant in Eurasia and South America. Fossils have been recorded in Brazil, China, Russia, Germany, the Transbaikal region, Tajikistan, Turkmenistan, Kyrgyzstan, Kazakhstan, Spain, and the United Kingdom. Important localities for palaeontinid fossils include the Crato Formation Lagerstätte of Brazil and the Yixian Formation, Haifanggou (or Jiulongshan) Formation, and the Daohugou Beds of China.

== Genera ==
The following is the list of genera classified under Palaeontinidae:

- †Abrocossus Wang & Zhang, 2007 in Wang et al. 2007a - Daohugou Beds, Middle Jurassic, East Asia
- †Archipsyche Handlirsch, 1906–1908 - Solnhofen Formation Late Jurassic, Central Europe
- †Asiocossus Becker-Migdisova, 1962 - Dzhil Formation, Early Jurassic, Central Asia
- †Baeocossus Menon et al. 2005 - Crato Formation Early Cretaceous, Eastern South America
- †Cicadomorpha Martynov, 1926 - Karabastau Formation, Late Jurassic, Central Asia; Glushkovo Formation, Ukurei Formation, Late Jurassic North Asia
- †Colossocossus Menon et al. 2005 - Crato Formation, Early Cretaceous, Eastern South America
- †Cratocossus Martins-Neto, 1998 - Crato Formation, Early Cretaceous, Eastern South America
- †Daohugoucossus Wang et al. 2006b - Daohugou, Middle Jurassic, East Asia
- †Eocicada Oppenheim, 1888 - Solnhofen Formation, Late Jurassic, Central Europe
- †Eoiocossus Wang et al. 2006c in Wang et al. 2006c - (includes Papilioncossus Wang et al. 2007c) Daohugou Middle Jurassic, East Asia
- †Gansucossus Wang et al. 2006b - Dashankou Formation, Jiulongshan Formation, Daohugou Middle Jurassic, East Asia
- †Hallakkungis Nam, Wang, & Szwedo, 2017 - Amisan Formation Upper Triassic, South Korea
- †Hamicossus Wang & Ren 2007ab - Daohugou Middle Jurassic, East Asia
- †Ilerdocossus Gomez-Pallerola, 1984 - (includes Wonnacottella Whalley & Jarzembowski, 1985 and Liaocossus Ren et al., 1998) La Pedrera de Rúbies Formation, Weald Clay, Yixian Formation Early Cretaceous, Western Europe & East Asia
- †Limacodites Handlirsch, 1906–1908 - Solnhofen Formation, Late Jurassic, Central Europe
- †Martynovocossus Wang & Zhang 2008 in Wang et al. 2008 - (= Pseudocossus Martynov, 1931) Badaowan Formation, Daohugou, Kushmurun Formation, Cheremkhovskaya Formation, Early to Middle Jurassic, North Asia; Late Jurassic, Central Asia
- †Miracossus Ren et al. 1998 - Yixian Formation, Early Cretaceous, East Asia
- †Montsecocossus Gomez-Pallerola, 1984 - La Pedrera de Rúbies Formation Early Cretaceous, Western Europe
- †Neimenggucossus Wang & Zhang, 2007 in Wang et al. 2007a - Daohugou, Middle Jurassic, East Asia
- †Ningchengia Wang, Zhang & Szwedo, 2009 - (= Fletcheriana Evans, 1956 in partim) Daohugou Middle Jurassic, East Asia
- †Pachypsyche Handlirsch 1906 - La Pedrera de Rúbies Formation Early Cretaceous, Western Europe
- †Palaeocossus Oppenheim, 1885 - Sagul Formation, Cheremkhovskaya Formation Early Jurassic, Central and North Asia
- †Palaeontina Butler, 1873 - Taynton Limestone Formation Middle Jurassic, Western Europe
- †Palaeontinodes Martynov, 1937 - (= Ijacossus Becker-Migdisova, 1950; Shcherbakov 1985) Sulyukta Formation, Sagul Formation, Haifanggou Formation, Cheremkhovskaya Formation, Early to Middle Jurassic, Central and North Asia; Middle Jurassic, Central Asia
- †Parawonnacottella Ueda, 1997 - Crato Formation, Early Cretaceous, Eastern South America
- †Phragmatoecicossus Becker-Migdisova, 1949 - Sagul Formation, Early to Middle Jurassic, Central Asia
- †Phragmatoecites Oppenheim, 1885 - Cheremkhovskaya Formation, Early to Middle Jurassic, North Asia
- †Plachutella Becker-Migdisova, 1949 - Badaowan Formation, Jiulongshan Formation, Daohugou, Karabastau Formation, Sagul Formation, Cheremkhovskaya Formation, Early to Late Jurassic, Central and Eastern Asia
- †Prolystra Oppenheim, 1888 syn Beloptesis - Solnhofen Formation, Late Jurassic, Central Europe
- †Protopsyche Handlirsch, 1906–1908 - Solnhofen Formation, Late Jurassic, Central Europe
- †Shurabocossus Becker-Migdisova, 1949 - Sagul Formation, Early to Middle Jurassic, Central Asia
- †Sinopalaeocossus Hong, 1983- (= Quadraticossus Wang & Ren, 2007a) Daohugou, Haifanggou Formation, Middle Jurassic, East Asia
- †Suljuktaja Becker-Migdisova, 1949 - Sulyukta Formation, Early to Middle Jurassic, Central Asia
- †Suljuktocossus Becker-Migdisova, 1949 - (= Fletcheriana Evans, 1956 in partim) Sulyukta Formation, Early Jurassic, Central Asia; Daohugou Middle Jurassic, North Asia
- †Synapocossus Wang et al. 2013 Daohugou Middle Jurassic, East Asia
- †Talbragarocossus Chen et al. 2019 Talbragar Fossil Fish Bed, Australia, Late Jurassic
- †Turgaiella Becker-Migdisova & Wootton, 1965 - Kushmurun Formation, Jurassic, Central Asia
- †Uralontina Shcherbakov, 2026 - Korkino coal mine, Upper Triassic, Southern Urals
- †Valdicossus Wang, Zhang & Jarzembowski 2008 - Weald Clay, Early Cretaceous, Western Europe
- †Yanocossus Ren, 1995 - Yixian Formation, Early Cretaceous, East Asia
- †Cyllonium Westwood, 1854 - Early Cretaceous, Western Europe (too poorly preserved)
- †Palaeontinopsis Martynov, 1937 - Early Jurassic, Central Asia (nomen dubium)
- †Palaeontinopsis sinensis - Hong, 1986; Zhang, 1997 Middle Jurassic, East Asia
- †Fletcheriana jurassica - Zhang, 1997
- †Fletcheriana magna - Riek, 1976

== See also ==
- Prehistoric Lepidoptera
- Prehistoric insects
