= Amisan Formation =

Late Triassic geologic formation in South Korea

- Stratigraphic range: Norian; ~227–208.5 Ma
- Type: Geological formation
- Unit of: Nampo Group
- Underlies: Jogyeri Formation
- Overlies: Hajo Formation
- Thickness: 750–1,000 m (2,460–3,280 ft)

Lithology
- Primary: Shale, Sandstone, Siltstone and Coal

Location
- Region: South Chungcheong Province
- Country: South Korea
- Extent: Chungnam Basin

Type section
- Named for: Amisan, Boryeong
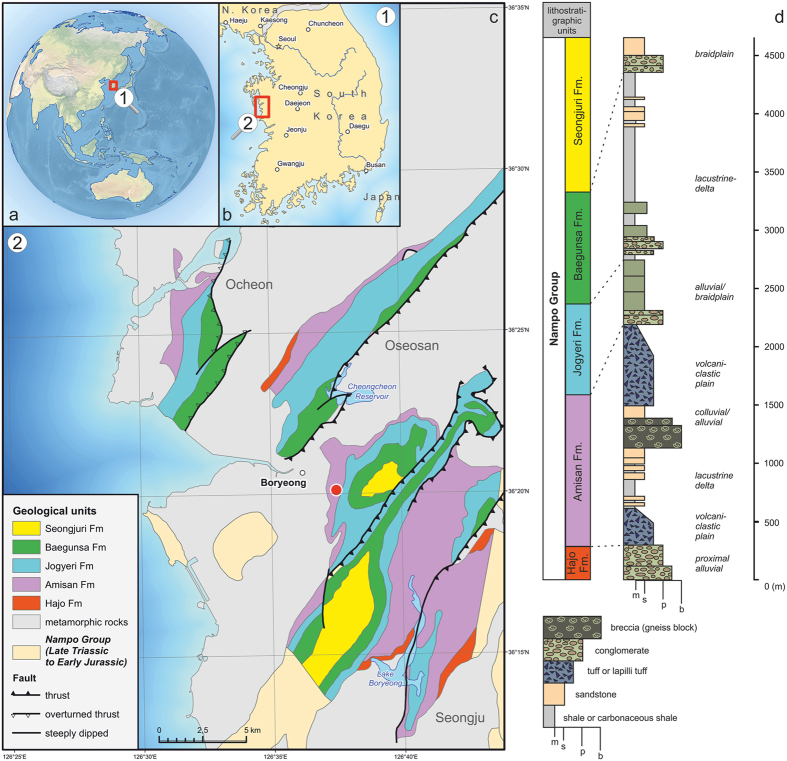
- Map and diagram of Nampo Group

The Amisan Formation (Korean: 아미산층; Hanja: 峨嵋山層) is an Late Triassic geologic formation in Boryeong, South Korea. Fossil records from this formation include plants, insects, and fish remains.

== Geology ==
The Amisan Formation in the Chungnam Basin overlies the Hajo Formation and underlies the Jogyeri Formation. It is subdivided into five zones based on its lithology, lower sandstone, lower shale, middle sandstone, middle shale, and upper sandstone zones. Depositional environments of the lower and middle shale zones of the Amisan Formation are thought to be lacustrine settings.

The depositional age of the Nampo Group including the Amisan Formation is debated, but plant genera Lobatannularia from the Amisan Formation, and Sphenophyllum from the Baegunsa Formation, which overlies the Amisan Formation and the Jogyeri Formation suggests that the Upper Triassic spans to the Baegunsa Formation. Also, conchostracan fossils and some insect fossils support the Triassic origin of the Amisan Formation.

== Fossil content ==
Most of the fossils from the Amisan Formation are from the lower shale zone and the middle shale zone.

=== Flora ===
Flora of the Amisan Formation
Genus	Species	Region	Member	Material	Notes	Image
Taeniopteris	T. eurychoron; T. mungyeongensis					

==== Ferns ====
Ferns of the Amisan Formation
Genus	Species	Region	Member	Material	Notes	Image
Neocalamites	N. carrerei					
Cladophlebis	C. nebbensis					
Lobatannularia	L. sp.					
Chiropteris	C. sp.					
Equisetites	E. kimi; E. gaehwariensis; E. deltodon					

==== Bennettitales ====
Bennettitales of the Amisan Formation
Genus	Species	Region	Member	Material	Notes	Image
Anomozamites	A. baegunsaensis					
Pterophyllum	P. seongjuriense; P. daecheonense					
Weltrichia	W. sp.					

==== Gymnosperms ====
Gymnosperms of the Amisan Formation
Genus	Species	Region	Member	Material	Notes	Image
Podozamites	P. lanceolatus; P. var. genuinea; P. schenki; P. nampoensis					
Anthrophyopsis	A. sp.					
Drepanozamites	D. sp.					
Baiera	B. cf. furcata					
Cycadocarpidium	C. sp.					
Ctenozamites	C. meogbangensis					
Leptostrobus	L. myeongamensis					

=== Bivalves ===
Bivalves of the Amisan Formation
Genus	Species	Region	Member	Material	Notes	Image
Margaritifera	M. cf. isfarensis					

=== Conchostracans ===
Conchostracans of the Amisan Formation
Genus	Species	Region	Member	Material	Notes	Image
Euestheria	E. kawasakii; E. shimamurai					
Cyclestherioides	C. rampoensis					
Sphaerestheria	S. koreanica					

=== Insects ===
Insects of the Amisan Formation
Genus	Species	Region	Member	Material	Notes	Image
Turbidapsyche	T. dobrokhotovae				A mesopsychid scorpionfly; originally assigned to the genus Mesopsyche.	
Siberioperlidae	Indeterminate				Stoneflies.	
Platyperla	P. sp.				Stoneflies.	
Baleyopterygidae	Indeterminate				Stoneflies.	
Hallakkungis	H. amisanus				A palaeontinid.	
Tennentsia	T. koreana				A cicadomorph.	
Sanmai	S?. zetavena				A tettigarctid.	
Magnatitan	M. jongheoni				A titanopteran.	
Koreaphlebia	K. iussradiae				A triadophlebiomorph odonatopteran.	
Koreatriassothemis	K. elongatus				A parazygopteran odonatopteran.	
?Isophlebioptera	Indeterminate				A possible Isophlebioptern nymph. Referred as 'Samarura-type' in paper.	
Shurabia	S. taewani				A Geinitziid polyneopteran.	

=== Vertebrates ===
Vertebrates of the Amisan Formation
Genus	Species	Region	Member	Material	Notes	Image
Hiascoactinus	H. boryeongensis				A redfieldiiform actinopterygian.	
Megalomatia	M. minima				A basal actinopterygian.	
