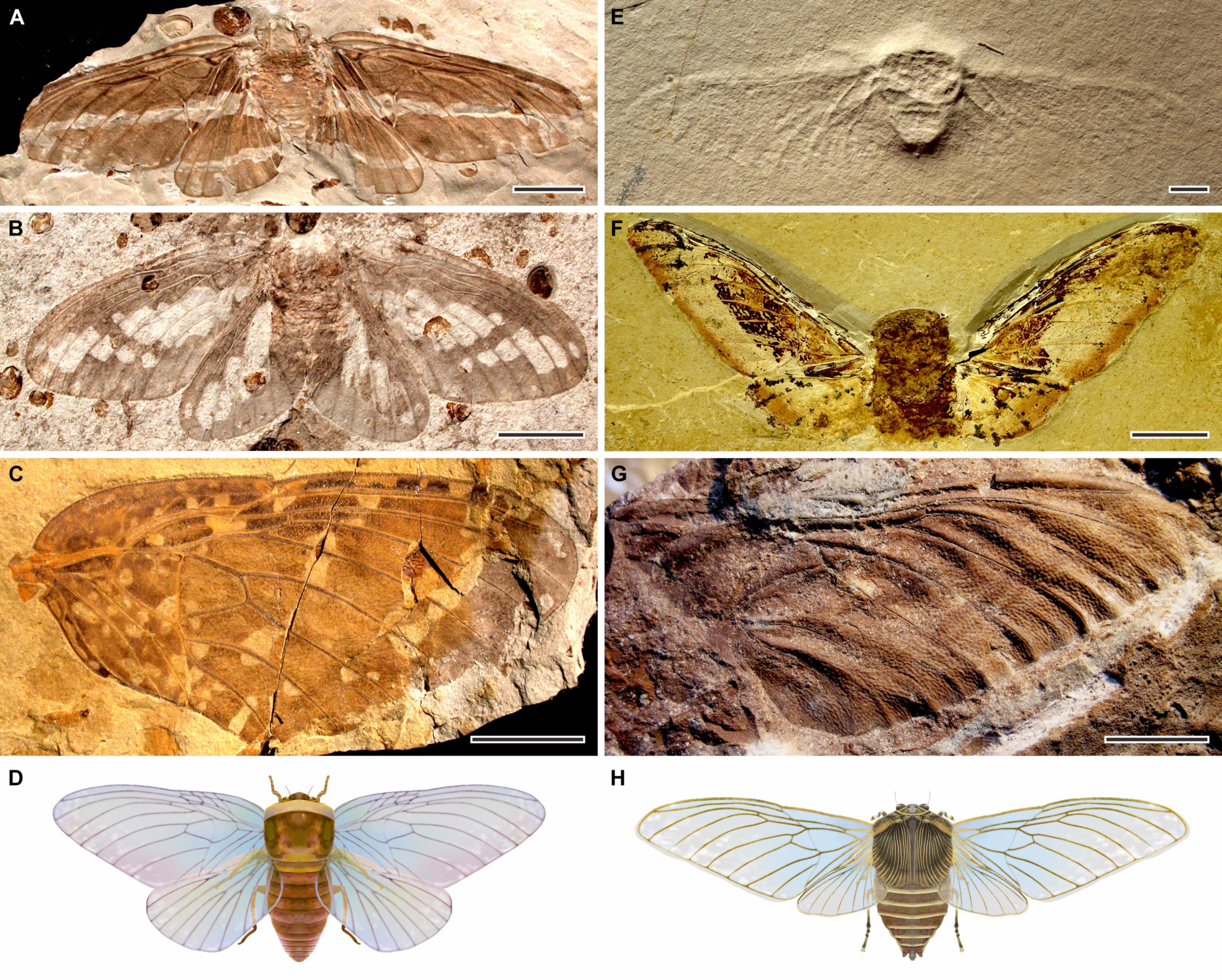
- Gallery of various members of Palaeontinidae

Scientific classification
- Kingdom: Animalia
- Phylum: Arthropoda
- Clade: Pancrustacea
- Class: Insecta
- Order: Hemiptera
- Suborder: Auchenorrhyncha
- Infraorder: Cicadomorpha
- Superfamily: †Palaeontinoidea; Handlirsch, 1906

Families
- See text

= Palaeontinoidea =

Palaeontinoidea Temporal range: Upper Permian to Middle Cretaceous

Extinct superfamily of true bugs

Palaeontinoidea is an extinct superfamily of cicadomorph hemipteran insects. This superfamily contains three families.

== Description ==
Palaeontinoids were comparatively large, cicada-like insects that existed from the Upper Permian to the Middle Cretaceous (around 260.4 to 112.0 million years ago).

== Subdivisions ==
The three families classified under Palaeontinoidea, along with their age range and collection sites, are the following:

- Mesogereonidae Tillyard, 1921

Upper Triassic; Australia and South Africa. Contains 2 genera, Mesogereon and Triassogereon.

- Dunstaniidae Tillyard, 1916

Upper Permian to Lower Jurassic; South Africa, Australia, France, Central Asia, and China.

- Palaeontinidae Handlirsch, 1906

Upper Triassic to Lower Cretaceous; Brazil, South Korea, China, Russia, Germany, Tajikistan, Turkmenistan, Kyrgyzstan, Kazakhstan, Spain, Germany, and the United Kingdom. Contains around 30 to 40 genera and about a hundred species.
