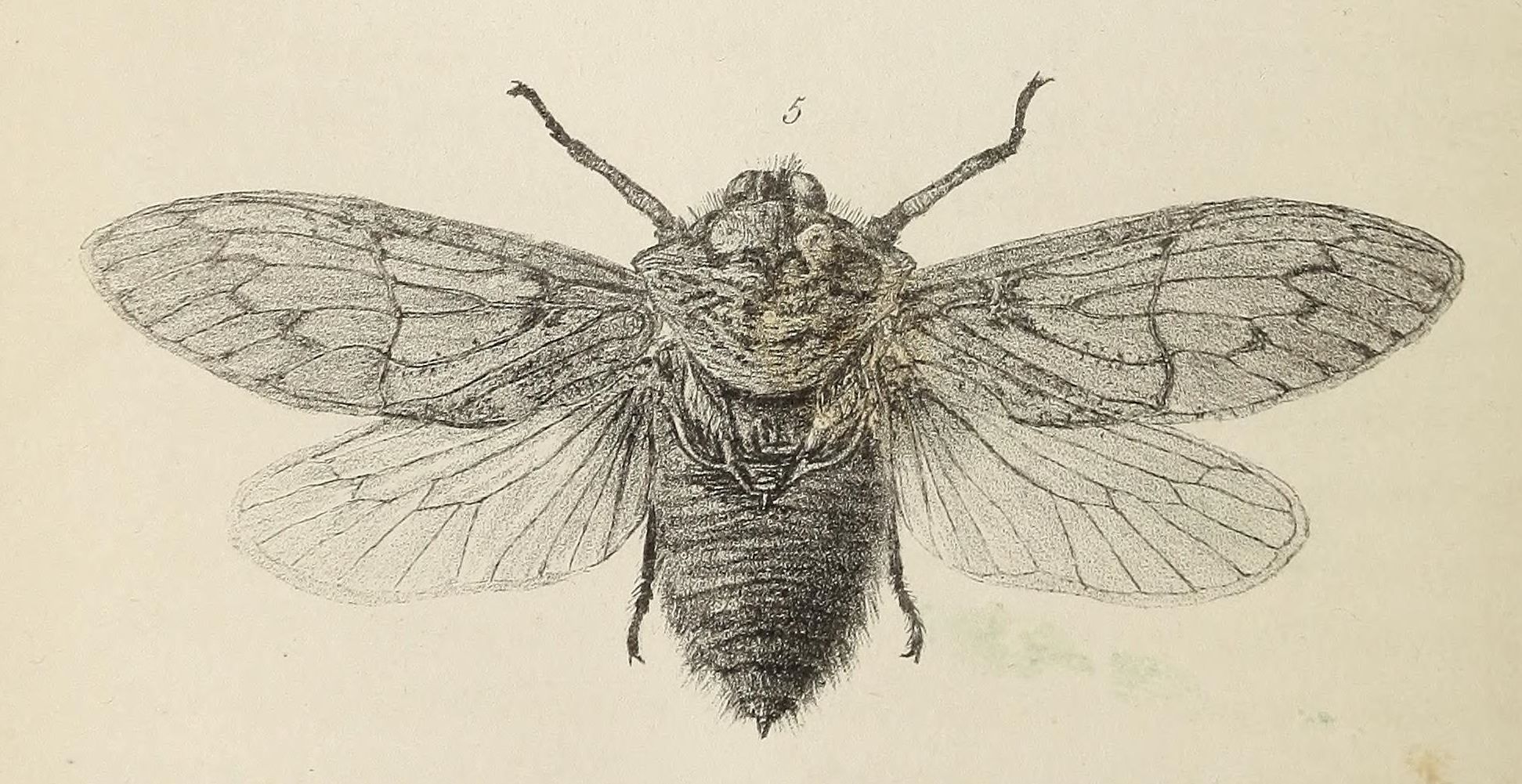

Scientific classification
- Kingdom: Animalia
- Phylum: Arthropoda
- Clade: Pancrustacea
- Class: Insecta
- Order: Hemiptera
- Suborder: Auchenorrhyncha
- Family: Tettigarctidae
- Genus: Tettigarcta
- Species: T. tomentosa

Binomial name
- Tettigarcta tomentosa White, 1845

= Tettigarcta tomentosa =

Species of cicada

Tettigarcta tomentosa is a species of cicada, also known as the Tasmanian hairy cicada, in the Tettigarctidae family, Tettigarctinae subfamily and Tettigarctini tribe. The species is endemic to Australia. It was described in 1845 by Scottish zoologist Adam White.

== Etymology ==
The specific epithet tomentosa comes from the Latin (“having rough hairs”), referring to the species’ appearance.

== Description ==
The length of the forewing is 32–41 mm.

== Distribution and habitat ==
The species is found throughout Tasmania. Associated habitats include subalpine and cool temperate eucalypt forest, as well as the margins of temperate rainforest.

== Behaviour ==
Adults may be found during much of the year, except in spring, hiding in tree crevices and beneath loose bark during the day and becoming active at night, communicating by vibration through the substrate.
