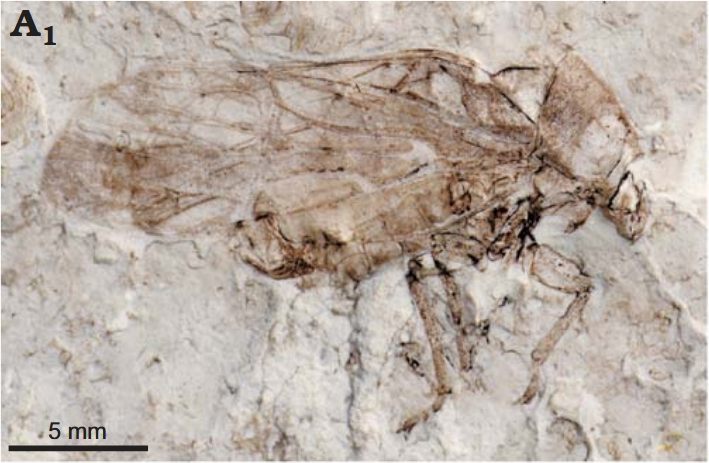
- Sanmai kongi holotype from the Jurassic of China

Scientific classification
- Domain: Eukaryota
- Kingdom: Animalia
- Phylum: Arthropoda
- Class: Insecta
- Order: Hemiptera
- Suborder: Auchenorrhyncha
- Family: Tettigarctidae
- Genus: †Sanmai; Chen et al., 2016

Species
- See text

= Sanmai (cicada) =

Sanmai Temporal range: Late Triassic-Middle Jurassic

Extinct genus of cicada

Sanmai is an extinct genus of tettigarctid cicada from the Late Triassic to the Middle Jurassic. The name is derived from the Mandarin san (three) and mai (branch) in reference to a certain vein of the wing being three-branched. This feature is also found in Architettix, a related fossil cicada genus. Sanmai currently contains four species. It undoubtedly belong to the subfamily Cicadoprosbolinae; however, placing it in a tribe has proved difficult. It is closely related to both Turutanoviini and Architettigini, and may be a transitional between the two. It is also possible it rests outside the two taxa, the similarities being convergent. Sanmai possesses "light and irregular speckles and lon-gitudinal stripes boldly contrasting to dark membrane, " which were likely designed to camouflage it from the many insectivourus creatures of the Jiulongshan Formation.

The oldest species, S. zetavena from the Amisan Formation was attributed to this genus. Still, due to the incompletely preserved tegmen, it is unclear whether the vein M3+4 is forked or simple as in this genus. Also, unlike other species of this genus, S. zetavena lacks color patterns in its forewing If this species is eventually classified within this genus, it represents Sanmai survived during the Late Triassic extinction event.

== Species ==
The following species are attributed to this genus:

Species	Notes	Image	Ref.
†S. kongi	Named for the family name of Confucius, founder of Confucianism	Sanmai kongi paratype STMN48-1801	
†S. mengi	Named for the family name of Mencius, a Sage of Confucianism.		
†S. xuni	Named for the family name of Xuncius, a Sage of Confucianism		
†S. zetavena	Named for referring to the Z-shaped CuA veins of the forewing.		
