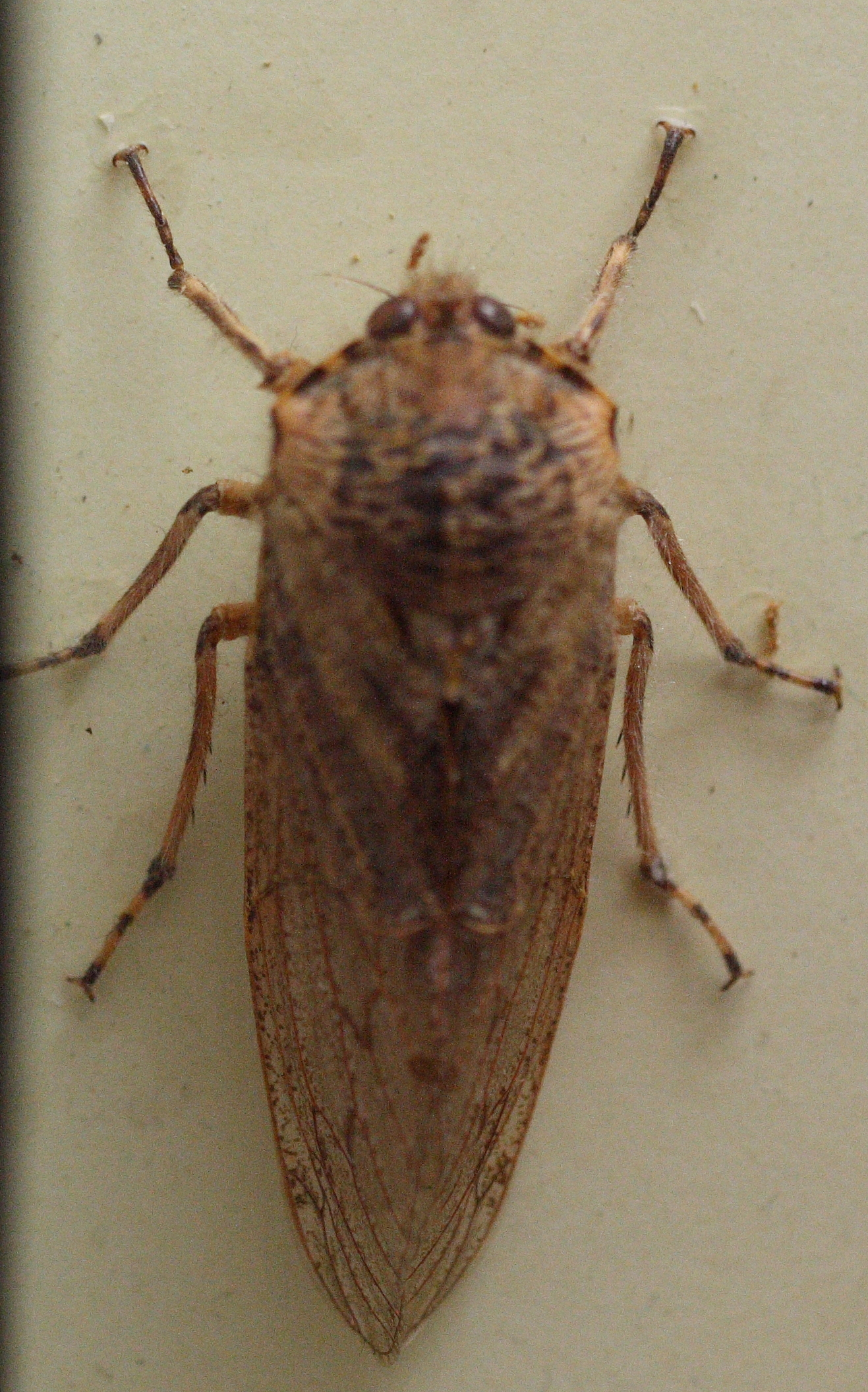

Scientific classification
- Kingdom: Animalia
- Phylum: Arthropoda
- Clade: Pancrustacea
- Class: Insecta
- Order: Hemiptera
- Suborder: Auchenorrhyncha
- Family: Tettigarctidae
- Genus: Tettigarcta
- Species: T. crinita

Binomial name
- Tettigarcta crinita Distant, 1883

= Tettigarcta crinita =

Species of cicada

Tettigarcta crinita is a species of cicada, also known as the alpine hairy cicada, in the Tettigarctidae family, Tettigarctinae subfamily and Tettigarctini tribe. The species is endemic to Australia. It was described in 1883 by English entomologist William Lucas Distant.

== Etymology ==
The specific epithet crinita comes from the Latin (“hairy” or “long-haired”), referring to the species’ appearance.

== Description ==
The length of the forewing is 35–43 mm.

== Distribution and habitat ==
The species has a montane distribution from the Blue Mountains of New South Wales, southwards through the Brindabella Range in the Australian Capital Territory into Victoria, then westwards to the Otway Ranges. Associated habitats include subalpine and cool temperate eucalypt forest and woodland, including areas with snow gums or mountain gums, as well as the margins of temperate rainforest.

== Behaviour ==
Adults may be observed from January to May, hiding in crevices and beneath loose bark during the day and becoming active at night, communicating by vibration through the substrate.

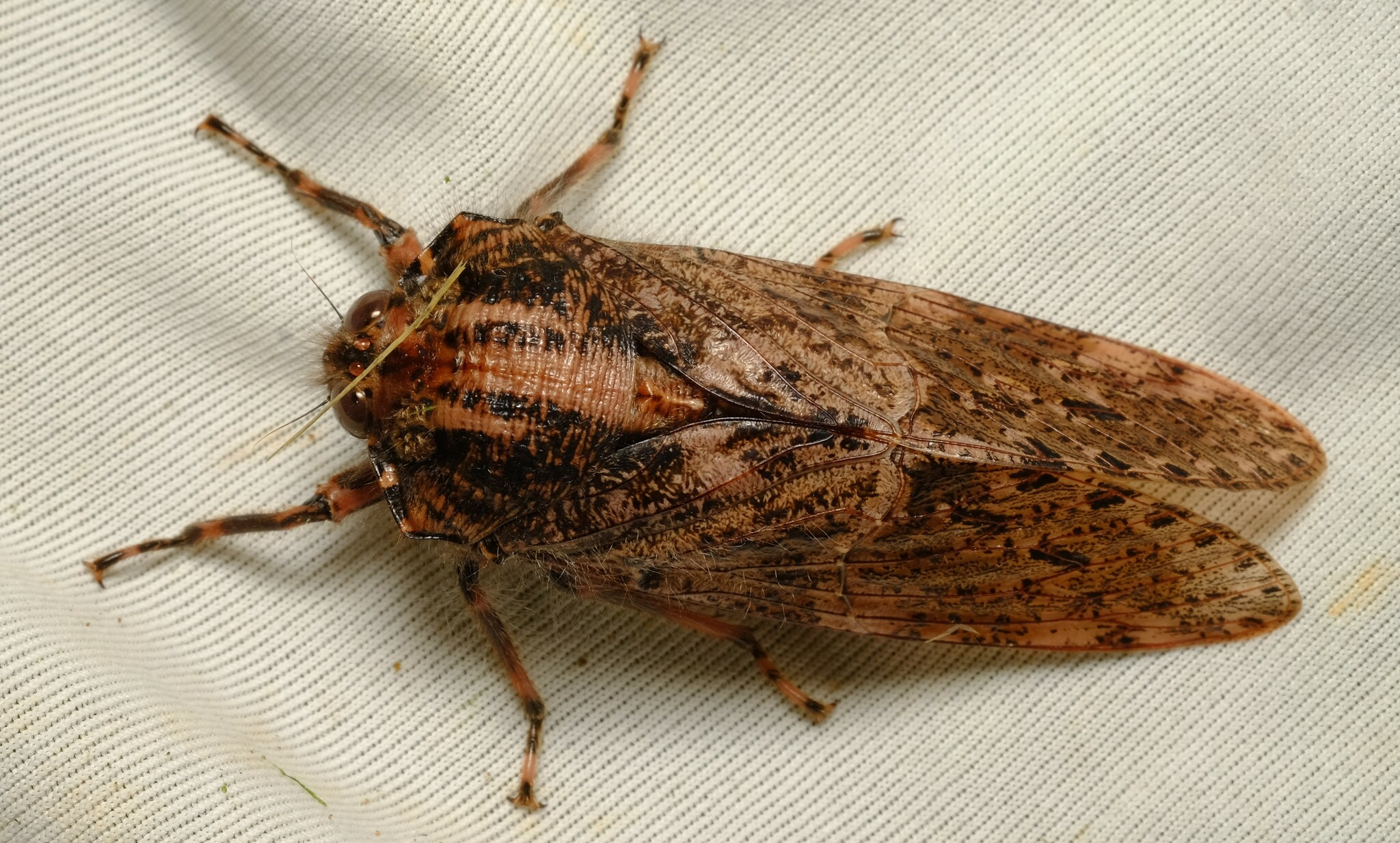
