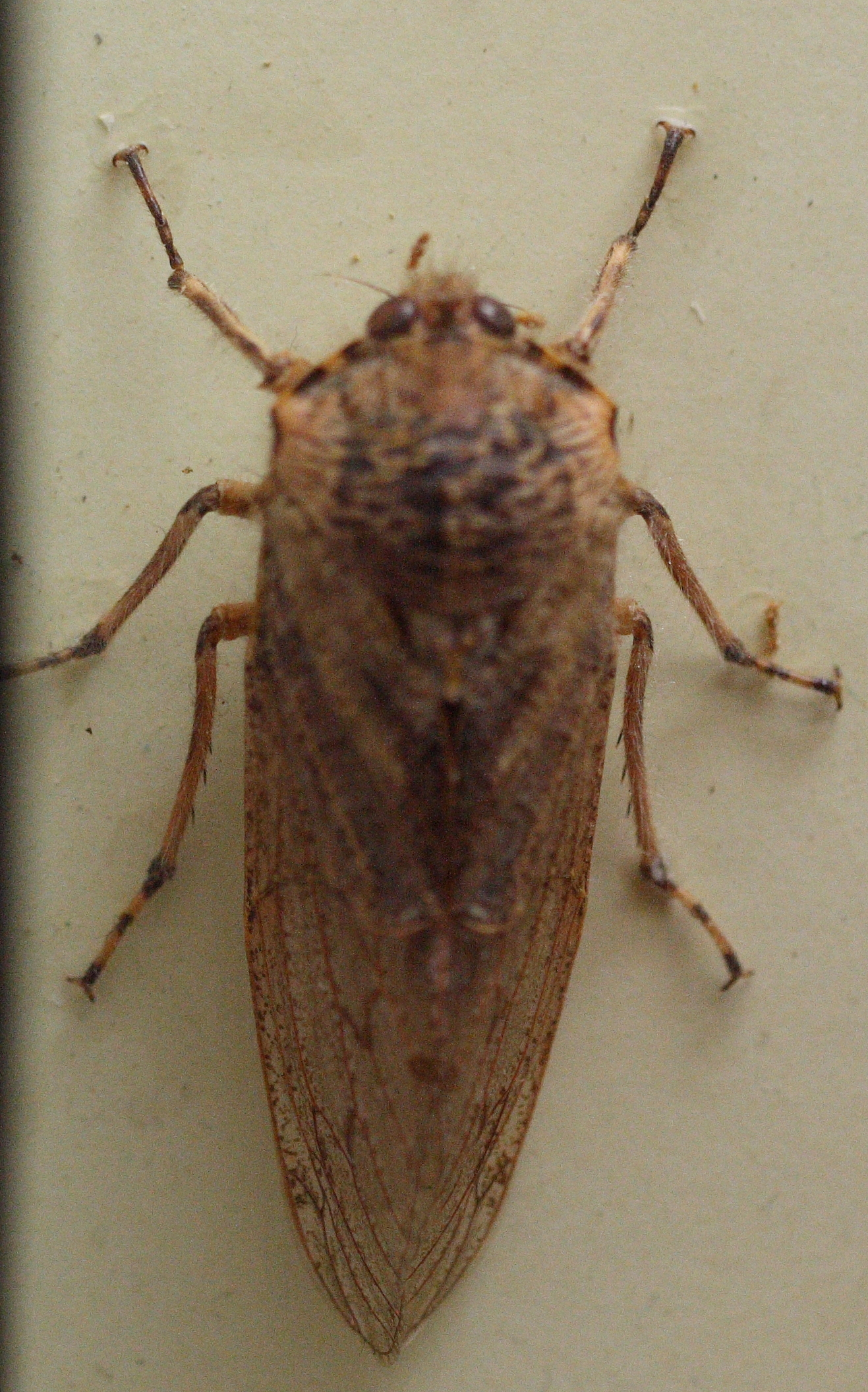
- Tettigarcta crinita

Scientific classification
- Kingdom: Animalia
- Phylum: Arthropoda
- Class: Insecta
- Order: Hemiptera
- Suborder: Auchenorrhyncha
- Family: Tettigarctidae
- Genus: Tettigarcta; White, 1845

= Tettigarcta =

Genus of true bugs

Tettigarcta is a genus of cicadas in the family Tettigarctidae. There are two described species in Tettigarcta, one found in mainland Australia and one on the island of Tasmania. These two species are the only living species of the family Tettigarctidae, the rest being extinct. They are around 3.5 to 4.5 centimetres in length. The species are active at night and are attracted to light, and rest under loose bark during the day. Unlike other cicadas, they do not make loud calls, but produce low intensity sounds transmitted through the substrate they are attached to, similar to other members of Auchenorrhyncha.

== Species ==
These two species belong to the genus Tettigarcta:

- Tettigarcta crinita Distant, 1906^{i c g}
- Tettigarcta tomentosa White, 1845^{i c g}

Data sources: i = ITIS, c = Catalogue of Life, g = GBIF, b = Bugguide.net
