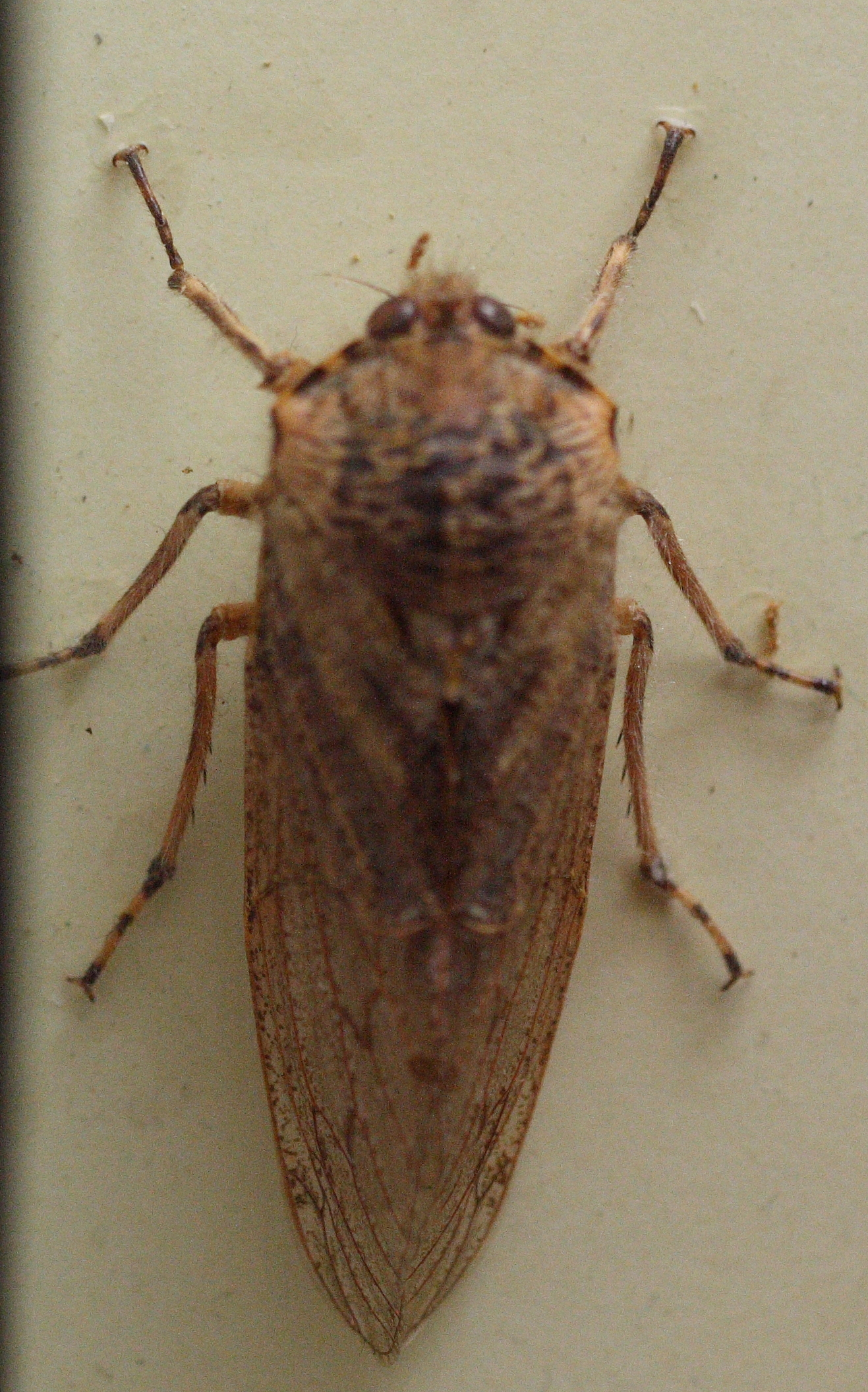
- Tettigarcta crinita specimen in the Australian Museum

Scientific classification
- Kingdom: Animalia
- Phylum: Arthropoda
- Clade: Pancrustacea
- Class: Insecta
- Order: Hemiptera
- Suborder: Auchenorrhyncha
- Superfamily: Cicadoidea
- Family: Tettigarctidae; Distant, 1905

= Tettigarctidae =

Tettigarctidae Temporal range: Norian–Recent

Family of true bugs

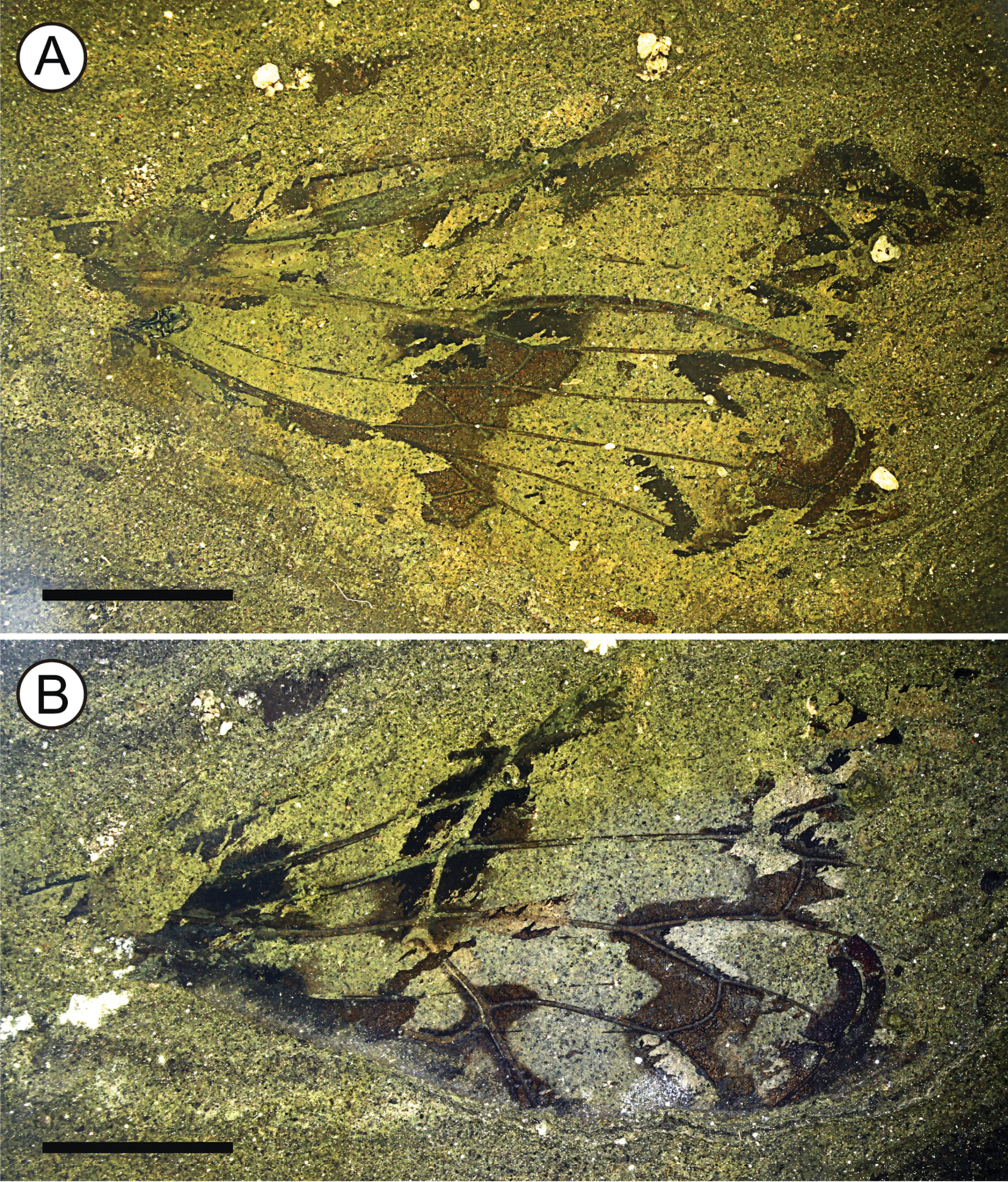
Paratettigarcta zealandica, fore and hindwing

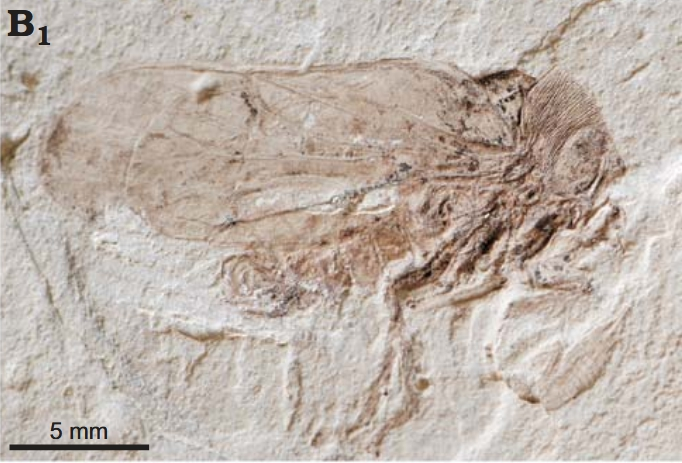
Sanmai kongi from the upper Middle–lower Upper Jurassic Daohugou beds, China

The Tettigarctidae, known as the hairy cicadas, are a small relict (mostly extinct) family of primitive cicadas. Along with more than 20 extinct genera, Tettigarctidae contains a single extant genus, Tettigarcta, with two extant species, one from southern Australia (T. crinita) and one from the island of Tasmania (T. tomentosa). Numerous fossil species have been described from the Late Triassic onwards. Tettigarcta are the closest living relatives of the true cicadas.

== Genera ==
Only one genus in the family Tettigarctidae is not extinct, Tettigarcta.

Many fossil genera have been historically attributed to this family. However, it has been argued that Tettigarctidae including all of these fossil species is a paraphyletic group that also includes some cicadas that are more closely related to Cicadidae than to Tettigarcta.

Dates given in million years ago (Ma).

Family Tettigarctidae

- † Hpanraais Jiang et al. 2019 - Burmese amber, Myanmar, mid Cretaceous (latest Albian-earliest Cenomanian) ~99 Ma (considered by some to be a synonym of Cretotettigarcta).
- † Mesodiphthera Tillyard, 1919 Blackstone Formation Australia, Late Triassic (Norian) 227–208.5 Ma
- † Tardilly Lambkin, 2019 Blackstone Formation Australia, 227–208.5 Ma

Subfamily Cicadoprosbolinae Evans, 1956

- † Maculaprosbole Zheng et al. 2016 - Daohugou Beds, China, Middle Jurassic 164.7 to 155.7 Ma
- Tribe Turutanoviini Scherbakov, 2008
  - † Hirtaprosbole Liu et al. 2016 - Daohugou Beds, China, 164.7 to 155.7 Ma
  - † Sanmai Chen, Zhang & Wang B 2016 - Daohugou Beds, China, 164.7 to 155.7 Ma (argued to be more closely related to Cicadidae)
  - † Shuraboprosbole Becker-Migdisova 1949 (syn- Paraprosbole Whalley 1985 according to Chen et al 2016) Sagul Formation Kyrgyzstan, Charmouth Mudstone Formation, United Kingdom, Early Jurassic, Daohugou Beds, China, Middle Jurassic 189.6 to 163.5 Ma (argued to be more closely related to Cicadidae)
  - † Tianyuprosbole Chen, Wang, Zhang & Wang, 2014 - Daohugou Beds, China, Middle Jurassic 164.7 to 163.5 Ma
  - † Turutanovia Becker-Migdisova 1949 - Karabastau Formation, Kazakhstan, Late Jurassic Gurvan-Eren Formation Mongolia, Early Cretaceous 164.7 to 112.6 Ma
- Tribe Cicadoprosbolini Evans, 1956
  - † Burmaprosbole Qiao et al, 2021 Burmese amber, Myanmar, 99 Ma
  - † Diphtheropsis Martynov 1937 - Dzhil Formation, Sulyukta Formation Kyrgyzstan, Tajikistan, Early Jurassic 189.6 to 183.0 Ma
  - † Cicadoprosbole Becker-Migdisova 1947 - Dzhil Formation, Kyrgyzstan, Early Jurassic 201.6 to 189.6 Ma
  - † Macrotettigarcta Chen and Wang 2016 - Daohugou Beds, China, Middle Jurassic 164.7 to 163.5 Ma (argued to be more closely related to Cicadidae)
  - † Elkinda Shcherbakov 1988 - Turga Formation, Russia, Early Cretaceous 125.45 to 122.46 Ma
  - † Shaanxiarcta Shcherbakov 2008 - Fengjiashan Formation, China, Early Cretaceous 136.4 to 125.45 Ma
  - † Hylaeoneura Lameere and Severin 1897 - Sainte-Barbe Clays Formation, Belgium, Early Cretaceous, 130.0 to 122.46 Ma
  - † Vetuprosbole Fu, Cai and Huang, 2019 Burmese amber, Myanmar, 99 Ma (argued to be more closely related to Cicadidae)
  - †"Liassocicada" ignota Brodie 1845, Lilstock Formation, United Kingdom, Late Triassic (Rhaetian) 205.6 - 201.6 Ma
- Tribe Architettigini Scherbakov, 2008
  - † Architettix Hamilton 1990 - Crato Formation, Brazil, Early Cretaceous (late Aptian) ~113 Ma

Subfamily Tettigarctinae Distant, 1905

- †Cretotettigarcta Fu, Cai and Huang, 2019 Burmese amber, Myanmar, 99 Ma (argued to be more closely related to Cicadidae)
- Tribe Protabanini Hong, 1982
  - † Eotettigarcta Zeuner 1944 - Ardtun Head, Isle of Mull, United Kingdom, Paleocene 58.7 to 55.8 Ma
  - † Liassocicada Bode 1953 - Posidonia Shale Germany, Early Jurassic 183.0 - 182.0 Ma
  - † Magrebarcta Shcherbakov 2008 - Douiret Formation, Tunisia, Early Cretaceous 125.45 to 112.6 Ma
  - † Protabanus Hong 1982 - Jiulongshan Formation, China, Middle Jurassic 164.7 to 163.5 Ma
  - † Sunotettigarcta Hong 1983 - Daohugou Beds, Jiulongshan Formation, China, Middle Jurassic Karabastau Formation Kazakhstan, Late Jurassic 164.7 to 155.7 Ma
  - † Tettagalma Menon 2005 - Crato Formation, Brazil, 122.46 to 112.6 Ma
  - † Maculaferrum Demers-Potvin et al 2020 - Redmond Formation, Canada, Late Cretaceous (Cenomanian) 99.7 to 94.3 Ma
- Tribe Meunierini Boulard et Nel, 1990
  - † Kisylia Martynov 1937 - Kyzyl-Kiya, Kyrgyzstan, Early Jurassic 189.6 to 183.0 Ma
  - † Meuniera Piton 1936 - Menat Formation, France, Paleocene 58.7 to 55.8 Ma
- Tribe Tettigarctini Distant, 1905
  - † Paratettigarcta Kaulfuss & Moulds 2015 - Hindon Maar, New Zealand, Miocene 23.03 to 15.97 Ma
  - Tettigarcta White, 1845 - Australia, extant

== See also ==
- List of cicadas of Australia
