= Xeropsalta eremica =

Scientific classification
- Kingdom: Animalia
- Phylum: Arthropoda
- Clade: Pancrustacea
- Class: Insecta
- Order: Hemiptera
- Suborder: Auchenorrhyncha
- Family: Cicadidae
- Genus: Xeropsalta
- Species: X. eremica

Binomial name
- Xeropsalta eremica Moulds & Marshall, 2025

Species of cicada

Xeropsalta eremica is a species of cicada, also known as the Nullarbor green, in the true cicada family, Cicadettinae subfamily and Cicadettini tribe. The species is endemic to Australia and was described in 2025 by Australian entomologists Maxwell Sydney Moulds and David C. Marshall.

== Etymology ==
The epithet eremica is derived from the Greek word for desert or wilderness, referring to its habitat.

== Appearance ==
Males have a body length of 12.3–13.9 mm, while females are slightly larger at 15.0–16.4 mm (including the ovipositor). The forewings are hyaline (glassy) with pale green to yellow venation.

The head is primarily black with a bit of green near the eyes and on the gena. The thorax is pale yellow-green to yellowish-brown with a complex pattern of black markings on the pronotum and mesonotum. A key distinguishing feature is the male's abdomen, which is predominantly black on the dorsal (upper) side, tapering evenly from the third segment. Females have much-reduced black abdominal markings compared to males.

The opercula (the plates covering the tymbals) in males are pale green to yellow, broadly rounded, and extend just beyond the tympanal cavity but do not meet. The male genitalia feature claspers that are distally fang-like and an aedeagus with short, pointed pseudoparameres.

== Habitat ==
Type specimens have been collected from short grass clumps following periods of good rainfall.

== Reproduction ==
Females respond to the male calling song by flicking their wings after each buzz. The female has a well-developed ovipositor sheath that protrudes almost 2 mm beyond the abdominal segment, which is used for laying eggs into plant tissue.

== Distribution ==
Xeropsalta eremica was thought to have a highly restricted distribution since it has been known only from two closely situated localities approximately 12–17 km east of Cocklebiddy in the far south-east of Western Australia. But later studies widened its range to the Coolgardie and Nullarbor bioregions of southern Western Australia.

== Taxonomy ==
It is most similar to Xeropsalta rattrayi but is distinguished by the male's predominantly black dorsal abdomen. The genus Xeropsalta is allied to Mugadina and Heremusina and is diagnosed by a combination of characters including fused stems of forewing veins, a straight costa to the wing node, and a male abdomen that is clearly wider than the thorax.
