= Birrima castanea =

Scientific classification
- Kingdom: Animalia
- Phylum: Arthropoda
- Clade: Pancrustacea
- Class: Insecta
- Order: Hemiptera
- Suborder: Auchenorrhyncha
- Family: Cicadidae
- Genus: Birrima
- Species: B. castanea

Binomial name
- Birrima castanea (Goding & Froggatt, 1904)

Synonyms
- Melampsalta castanea Goding & Froggatt, 1904; Melampsalta fulva Goding & Froggatt, 1904; Melampsalta flava Goding & Froggatt, 1904; Birrima montrouzieri Distant, 1906

Species of cicada

Birrima castanea is a species of cicada, also known as the red tree-ticker, in the true cicada family, Cicadettinae subfamily and Cicadettini tribe. It is endemic to Australia. It was described in 1904 by entomologists Frederic Webster Goding and Walter Wilson Froggatt.

== Description ==
The length of the forewing is 25–34 mm.

== Distribution and habitat ==
The species is found in the warm temperate coastal areas of eastern Australia, from Cooloola National Park in south-eastern Queensland, southwards to Greater Sydney in New South Wales. The associated habitat is tall, wet sclerophyll forest, the margins of subtropical rainforest and riparian vegetation.

== Behaviour ==
Adults may be heard from September to February, clinging to trees, shrubs and artificial structures, or flying about actively, uttering slow, repeated zeeeet calls.
