= Pauropsalta infuscata =

Scientific classification
- Kingdom: Animalia
- Phylum: Arthropoda
- Clade: Pancrustacea
- Class: Insecta
- Order: Hemiptera
- Suborder: Auchenorrhyncha
- Family: Cicadidae
- Genus: Pauropsalta
- Species: P. infuscata

Binomial name
- Pauropsalta infuscata (Goding & Froggatt, 1904)

Synonyms
- Melampsalta infuscata Goding & Froggatt, 1904; Cicadetta infuscata (Goding & Froggatt, 1904)

Species of cicada

Pauropsalta infuscata is a species of cicada, also known as the large mallee squawker, in the true cicada family, Cicadettinae subfamily and Cicadettini tribe. It is endemic to Australia. It was described in 1904 by entomologists Frederic Webster Goding and Walter Wilson Froggatt.

== Description ==
The length of the forewing is 19–25 mm.

== Distribution and habitat ==
The species occurs across southern mainland Australia from the Goldfields region of Western Australia, eastwards through South Australia and north-western Victoria to Condobolin in central New South Wales. The associated habitat is mallee woodland.

== Behaviour ==
Adult males may be heard while clinging to the trunks and lower branches of mallee eucalypts, emitting low-pitched calls.
