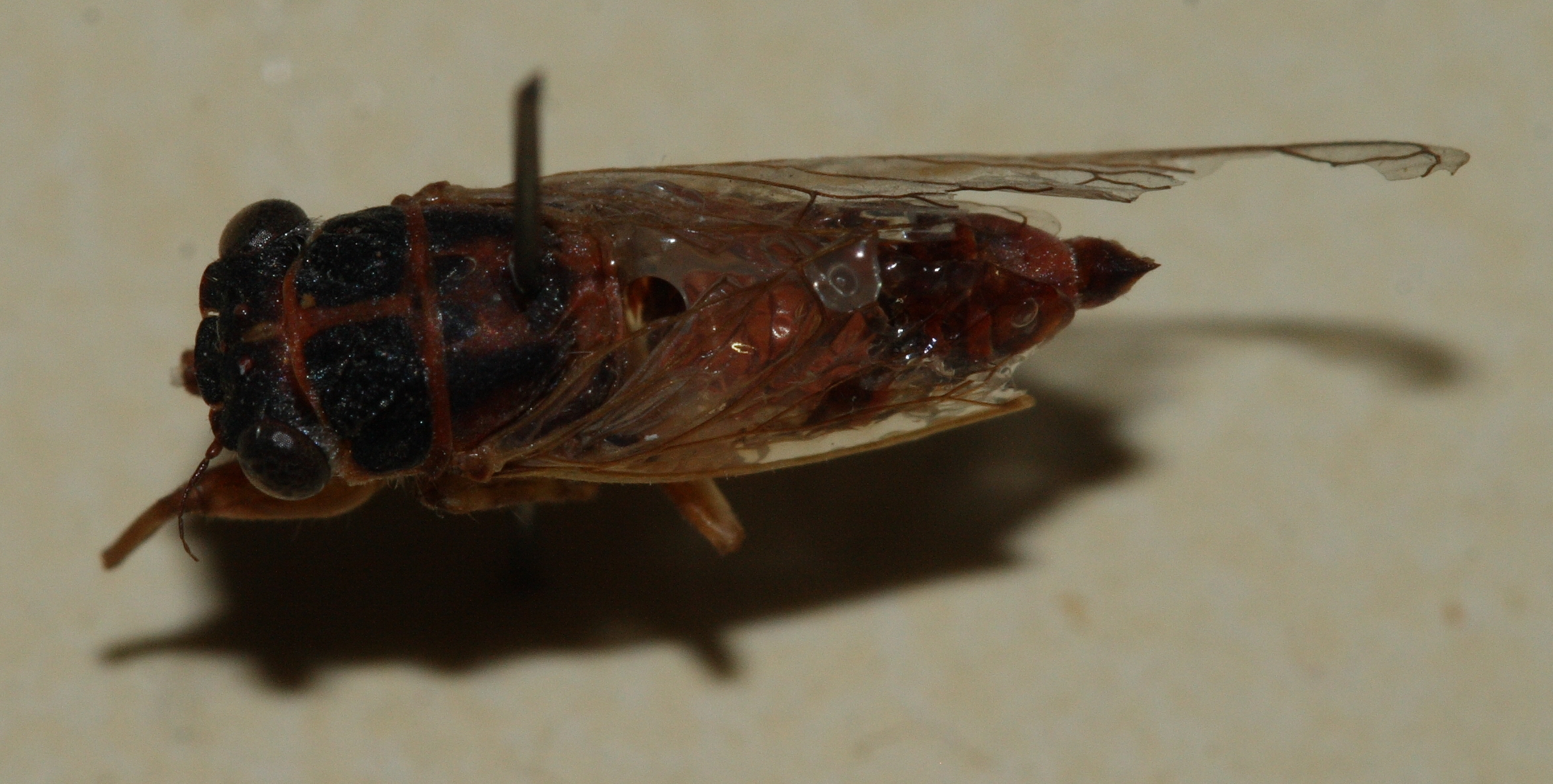

Scientific classification
- Kingdom: Animalia
- Phylum: Arthropoda
- Class: Insecta
- Order: Hemiptera
- Suborder: Auchenorrhyncha
- Family: Cicadidae
- Tribe: Cicadettini
- Genus: Pauropsalta; Goding & Froggatt, 1904

Type species
- Pauropsalta leurensis Goding & Froggatt, 1904

= Pauropsalta =

Genus of insects

Pauropsalta is a genus of cicadas, belonging to the family Cicadidae and mostly known as squawkers. It was first described in 1904 by Frederic Webster Goding and Walter Wilson Froggatt.

The species of this genus are found in all states and territories of Australia.

== Species ==
Species:

- Pauropsalta accola Owen & Moulds, 2016 (Lively Squawker)
- Pauropsalta adelphe Owen & Moulds, 2016 (Top End Frog Squawker)
- Pauropsalta agasta Owen & Moulds, 2016 (Kimberley Frog Squawker)
- Pauropsalta borealis Goding & Froggatt, 1904 (Little Orange Squawker)
- Pauropsalta castanea Goding & Froggatt, 1904 (Flinders Squawker)
- Pauropsalta confinis Owen & Moulds, 2016 (Seismic Squawker)
- Pauropsalta conflua Owen & Moulds, 2016 (Small Mallee Squawker)
- Pauropsalta contigua Owen & Moulds, 2016 (Oven Squawker)
- Pauropsalta elgneri Ashton, 1912 (Paperbark Tree-clicker)
- Pauropsalta ewarti Owen & Moulds, 2016 (Herberton Squawker)
- Pauropsalta extensa Goding & Froggatt, 1904 (Slender Squawker)
- Pauropsalta extrema (Distant, 1892) (Typewriter)
- Pauropsalta herveyensis Owen & Moulds, 2016 (Herveys Range Squawker)
- Pauropsalta infrasila Moulds, 1987 (Tropical Orange Squawker)
- Pauropsalta infuscata (Goding & Froggatt, 1904) (Large Mallee Squawker)
- Pauropsalta juncta Owen & Moulds, 2016 (Stirling Squawker)
- Pauropsalta katherina Owen & Moulds, 2016 (Kathy's Squawker)
- Pauropsalta kriki Owen & Moulds, 2016 (River Galloper)
- Pauropsalta melanopygia (Germar, 1834) (Strident Squawker)
- Pauropsalta mneme (Walker, 1850) (Alarm Clock Squawker)
- Pauropsalta opaca Ewart, 1989 (Fairy Dust Squawker)
- Pauropsalta rubra Goding & Froggatt, 1904 (Sale Squeaker)
- Pauropsalta similis Owen & Moulds, 2016 (Kimberley Squawker)
- Pauropsalta sinavilla Owen & Moulds, 2016 (Pilbara Squawker)
- Pauropsalta stigmatica Distant, 1905
- Pauropsalta walkeri Moulds & Owen, 2011 (Normanton Squawker)
