= Haemopsalta rubea =

Scientific classification
- Kingdom: Animalia
- Phylum: Arthropoda
- Clade: Pancrustacea
- Class: Insecta
- Order: Hemiptera
- Suborder: Auchenorrhyncha
- Family: Cicadidae
- Genus: Haemopsalta
- Species: H. rubea

Binomial name
- Haemopsalta rubea (Goding & Froggatt, 1904)

Synonyms
- Melampsalta rubea Goding, & Froggatt, 1904; Melampsalta nebulosa Goding, & Froggatt, 1904; Melampsalta geisha Distant, 1915

Species of cicada

Haemopsalta rubea is a species of cicada, also known as the red squeaker, in the true cicada family, Cicadettinae subfamily and Cicadettini tribe. It is endemic to Australia. It was described in 1904 by entomologists Frederic Webster Goding and Walter Wilson Froggatt.

== Description ==
The length of the forewing is 16–21 mm.

== Distribution and habitat ==
The species occurs in eastern Australia, coastally and subcoastally along the Great Dividing Range, from the Windsor Tablelands in Far North Queensland southwards as far as the Royal National Park south of Sydney, New South Wales. It is widespread in Greater Brisbane, including Bribie and North Stradbroke Islands. Its associated habitat is wet and dry sclerophyll forest.

== Behaviour ==
Adult males are heard from September to April, clinging to the upper branches of eucalypts, uttering repetitive, monotonous, chirping calls.
