= Pauropsalta rubra =

Scientific classification
- Kingdom: Animalia
- Phylum: Arthropoda
- Clade: Pancrustacea
- Class: Insecta
- Order: Hemiptera
- Suborder: Auchenorrhyncha
- Family: Cicadidae
- Genus: Pauropsalta
- Species: P. rubra

Binomial name
- Pauropsalta rubra Goding & Froggatt, 1904

Species of cicada

Pauropsalta rubra is a species of cicada, also known as the Sale squeaker, in the true cicada family, Cicadettinae subfamily and Cicadettini tribe. It is endemic to Australia. It was described in 1904 by entomologists Frederic Webster Goding and Walter Wilson Froggatt.

== Taxonomy ==
The type specimen, a female collected at Sale in Victoria, is missing. There are no associated male specimens, its identity is uncertain, and the species name may be treated as a nomen dubium.
