= Platypsalta dubia =

Scientific classification
- Kingdom: Animalia
- Phylum: Arthropoda
- Clade: Pancrustacea
- Class: Insecta
- Order: Hemiptera
- Suborder: Auchenorrhyncha
- Family: Cicadidae
- Genus: Platypsalta
- Species: P. dubia

Binomial name
- Platypsalta dubia (Goding & Froggatt, 1904)

Synonyms
- Pauropsalta dubia Goding & Froggatt, 1904

Species of cicada

Platypsalta dubia is a species of cicada, also known as the black scrub-buzzer, in the true cicada family, Cicadettinae subfamily and Cicadettini tribe. The species is endemic to Australia. It was described in 1904 by entomologists Frederic Webster Goding and Walter Wilson Froggatt.

== Description ==
The length of the forewing is 12–14 mm.

== Distribution and habitat ==
The species occurs in eastern Australia from southern Queensland through New South Wales and northern Victoria into south-eastern South Australia. Associated habitats include semi-arid shrubland and brigalow woodland.

== Behaviour ==
Adult males may be heard from November to February, clinging to the stems of shrubs and small trees, emitting soft, high-pitched, rattling calls.
