= Pauropsalta extensa =

Scientific classification
- Kingdom: Animalia
- Phylum: Arthropoda
- Clade: Pancrustacea
- Class: Insecta
- Order: Hemiptera
- Suborder: Auchenorrhyncha
- Family: Cicadidae
- Genus: Pauropsalta
- Species: P. extensa

Binomial name
- Pauropsalta extensa Goding & Froggatt, 1904

Synonyms
- Pauropsalta prolongata Goding & Froggatt, 1904; Melampsalta prolongata Ashton, 1914; Melampsalta extensa Duffels & van der Laan, 1985

Species of cicada

Pauropsalta extensa is a species of cicada, also known as the slender squawker, in the true cicada family, Cicadettinae subfamily and Cicadettini tribe. It is endemic to Australia. It was described in 1904 by entomologists Frederic Webster Goding and Walter Wilson Froggatt.

== Description ==
The length of the forewing is 18–23 mm.

== Distribution and habitat ==
The species occurs in south-eastern South Australia and the central Eyre Peninsula. The associated habitat is mallee eucalypt woodland, including roadside remnants.

== Behaviour ==
Adult males may be heard while clinging to the branches and stems of mallee eucalypts, emitting short buzzing calls, monotonously repeated.
