= Mugadina emma =

Scientific classification
- Kingdom: Animalia
- Phylum: Arthropoda
- Clade: Pancrustacea
- Class: Insecta
- Order: Hemiptera
- Suborder: Auchenorrhyncha
- Family: Cicadidae
- Genus: Mugadina
- Species: M. emma

Binomial name
- Mugadina emma (Goding & Froggatt, 1904)

Synonyms
- Pauropsalta emma Goding & Froggatt, 1904

Species of cicada

Mugadina emma is a species of cicada, also known as the amber grass-ticker, in the true cicada family, Cicadettinae subfamily and Cicadettini tribe. It is endemic to Australia. It was described in 1904 by entomologists Frederic Webster Goding and Walter Wilson Froggatt.

== Description ==
The length of the forewing is 13–15 mm.

== Distribution and habitat ==
The species occurs in subcoastal and inland areas of eastern Queensland southwards to the New South Wales border. Its associated habitat is open grassland.

== Behaviour ==
Adult males may be heard from October to March, clinging to grass stems, uttering slow, sharp, ticking calls.
