= Pauropsalta castanea =

Scientific classification
- Kingdom: Animalia
- Phylum: Arthropoda
- Clade: Pancrustacea
- Class: Insecta
- Order: Hemiptera
- Suborder: Auchenorrhyncha
- Family: Cicadidae
- Genus: Pauropsalta
- Species: P. castanea

Binomial name
- Pauropsalta castanea Goding & Froggatt, 1904

Species of cicada

Pauropsalta castanea is a species of cicada, also known as the Flinders squawker, in the true cicada family, Cicadettinae subfamily and Cicadettini tribe. It is endemic to Australia. It was described in 1904 by entomologists Frederic Webster Goding and Walter Wilson Froggatt.

== Description ==
The length of the forewing is 20–25 mm.

== Distribution and habitat ==
The species occurs in eastern South Australia, including the Flinders Ranges and Adelaide Hills, western New South Wales and north-western Victoria. The associated habitat is eucalypt woodland along watercourses, especially with river red gums.

== Behaviour ==
Adult males may be heard from October to February, clinging to the trunks of eucalypts, emitting extended, loud, low-pitched zeeep calls.
