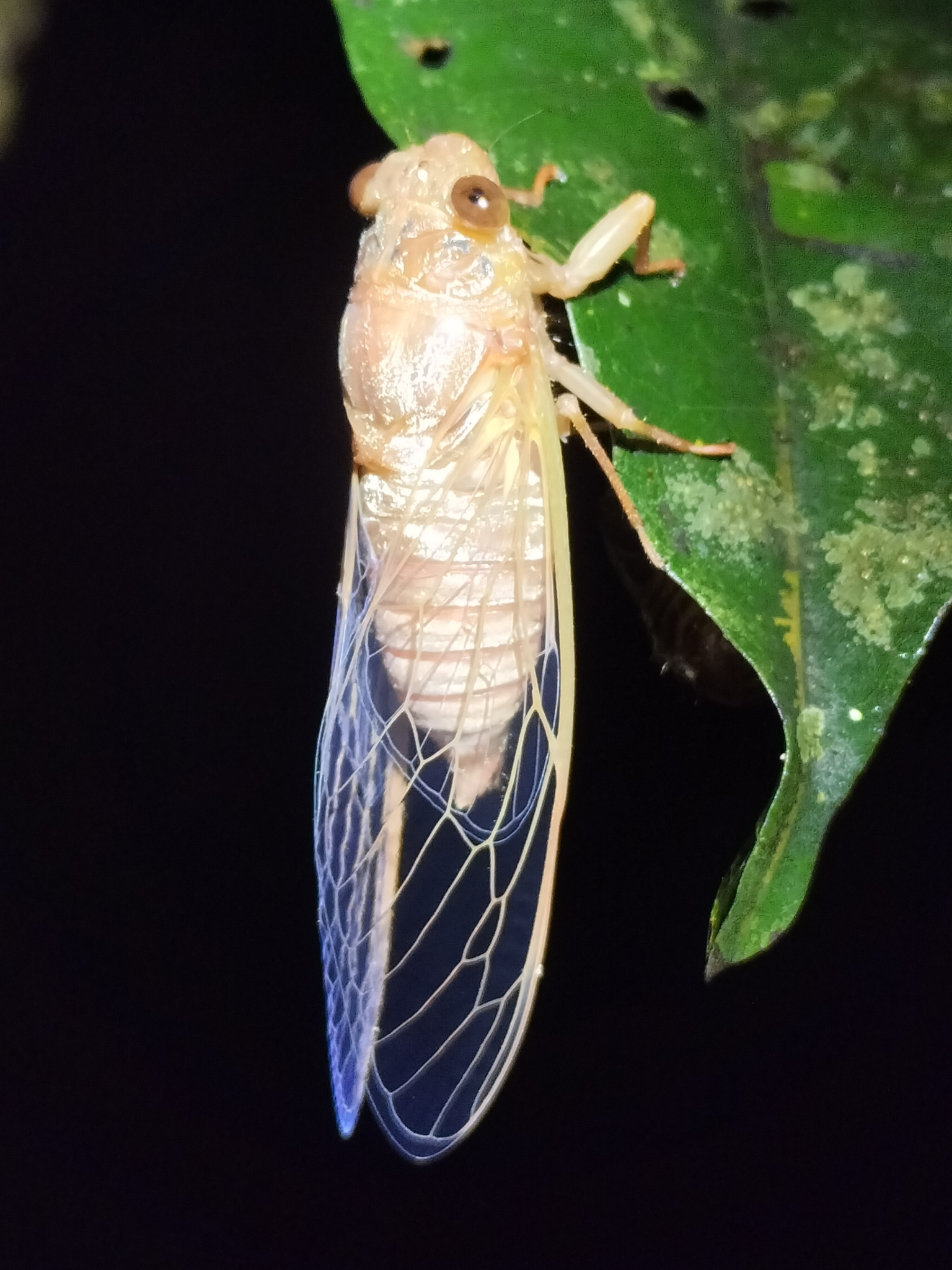

Scientific classification
- Kingdom: Animalia
- Phylum: Arthropoda
- Clade: Pancrustacea
- Class: Insecta
- Order: Hemiptera
- Suborder: Auchenorrhyncha
- Family: Cicadidae
- Genus: Tamasa
- Species: T. doddi

Binomial name
- Tamasa doddi (Goding & Froggatt, 1904)

Synonyms
- Tibicen doddi Goding & Froggatt, 1904

= Tamasa doddi =

Species of cicada

Tamasa doddi, also known as Dodd’s bunyip, is a species of cicada in the true cicada family. It is endemic to Australia. It was described in 1904 by entomologists Frederic Webster Goding and Walter Wilson Froggatt.

== Description ==
The length of the forewing is 27–39 mm.

== Distribution and habitat ==
The species occurs in northern coastal Queensland from north of Cooktown southwards to Innisfail, extending inland to the Atherton Tableland. The associated habitat is tropical rainforest, including riverine and swamp forest, parkland and gardens.

== Behaviour ==
Adults are heard from October to May, clinging to tree trunks, often in local aggregations, and uttering long buzzing calls which terminate in a short stutter.
