= Myopsalta binotata =

Scientific classification
- Kingdom: Animalia
- Phylum: Arthropoda
- Clade: Pancrustacea
- Class: Insecta
- Order: Hemiptera
- Suborder: Auchenorrhyncha
- Family: Cicadidae
- Genus: Myopsalta
- Species: M. binotata

Binomial name
- Myopsalta binotata (Goding & Froggatt, 1904)

Synonyms
- Melampsalta binotata Goding & Froggatt, 1904; Cicadetta binotata (Goding & Froggatt, 1904)

Species of cicada

Myopsalta binotata is a species, or species complex, of cicadas, also known as robust smoky buzzers, in the true cicada family, Cicadettinae subfamily and Cicadettini tribe. It is endemic to Australia. It was described in 1904 by entomologists Frederic Webster Goding and Walter Wilson Froggatt.

== Description ==
The length of the forewing is 14–19 mm.

== Distribution and habitat ==
Members of the species complex are known from southern Queensland and northern New South Wales (chocolate smoky buzzer and Mitchell smoky buzzer), as well as from parts of south-eastern South Australia (two-dot smoky buzzer). The associated habitats include open grassland, grassy clearings in woodland, and shrubland.

== Behaviour ==
Adult males may be heard from October to January, uttering a variety of buzzing, chirping or rattling calls, especially in sunny conditions.
