= Myopsalta atrata =

Scientific classification
- Kingdom: Animalia
- Phylum: Arthropoda
- Clade: Pancrustacea
- Class: Insecta
- Order: Hemiptera
- Suborder: Auchenorrhyncha
- Family: Cicadidae
- Genus: Myopsalta
- Species: M. atrata

Binomial name
- Myopsalta atrata (Goding & Froggatt, 1904)

Synonyms
- Melampsalta atrata Goding & Froggatt, 1904; Notopsalta atrata (Goding & Froggatt, 1904)

Species of cicada

Myopsalta atrata is a species of cicada, also known as the orange-bellied buzzer, in the true cicada family, Cicadettinae subfamily and Cicadettini tribe. It is endemic to Australia. It was described in 1904 by entomologists Frederic Webster Goding and Walter Wilson Froggatt.

== Description ==
The length of the forewing is 13–17 mm.

== Distribution and habitat ==
The species is only known from the Greater Sydney area in the Hawkesbury sandstone region of central eastern New South Wales. Its associated habitat is open heathland and woodland with a heathy understorey.

== Behaviour ==
Adult males may be heard from September to March, uttering calls characterised by a high-pitched rattle that becomes a buzzing phrase.
