= Pauropsalta borealis =

Scientific classification
- Kingdom: Animalia
- Phylum: Arthropoda
- Clade: Pancrustacea
- Class: Insecta
- Order: Hemiptera
- Suborder: Auchenorrhyncha
- Family: Cicadidae
- Genus: Pauropsalta
- Species: P. borealis

Binomial name
- Pauropsalta borealis Goding & Froggatt, 1904

Synonyms
- Melampsalta borealis Burns, 1957

Species of cicada

Pauropsalta borealis is a species, or species complex, of cicadas, also known as little orange squawkers, in the true cicada family, Cicadettinae subfamily and Cicadettini tribe. The complex is endemic to Australia. It was described in 1904 by entomologists Frederic Webster Goding and Walter Wilson Froggatt.

== Description ==
The length of the forewing is 15–20 mm.

== Distribution and habitat ==
The species occurs in the Top End of the Northern Territory from Darwin southwards to Katherine, and in the Kimberley region of northern Western Australia. The associated habitat is open eucalypt woodland.

== Behaviour ==
Adult males may be heard from November to February, emitting chirping, rattling and buzzing calls.
