= Auscala spinosa =

Scientific classification
- Kingdom: Animalia
- Phylum: Arthropoda
- Clade: Pancrustacea
- Class: Insecta
- Order: Hemiptera
- Suborder: Auchenorrhyncha
- Family: Cicadidae
- Genus: Auscala
- Species: A. spinosa

Binomial name
- Auscala spinosa (Goding & Froggatt, 1904)

Species of cicada

Auscala spinosa is a species of cicada, also known as the creaking branch cicada, in the true cicada family, Cicadettinae subfamily and Cicadettini tribe. It is endemic to Australia. It was described in 1904 by entomologists Frederic Webster Goding and Walter Wilson Froggatt.

== Description ==
The length of the forewing is 27–35 mm.

== Distribution and habitat ==
The species is found in inland eastern Australia, from the vicinity of Townsville in North Queensland, south-westwards through central New South Wales to Victoria and the extreme south-east of South Australia. The associated habitat is woodland dominated by ironbark eucalypts, Casuarina pauper or Casuarina cristata (belah).

== Behaviour ==
Adults may be heard from September to March, clinging to the upper branches of trees, uttering the songs which have been likened to the sounds made by the creaking of tree branches.
