= Pauropsalta similis =

Scientific classification
- Kingdom: Animalia
- Phylum: Arthropoda
- Clade: Pancrustacea
- Class: Insecta
- Order: Hemiptera
- Suborder: Auchenorrhyncha
- Family: Cicadidae
- Genus: Pauropsalta
- Species: P. similis

Binomial name
- Pauropsalta similis Owen & Moulds, 2016

Species of cicada

Pauropsalta similis is a species of cicada, also known as the Kimberley squawker, in the true cicada family, Cicadettinae subfamily and Cicadettini tribe. It is endemic to Australia. It was described in 2016 by entomologists Christopher Owen and Maxwell Sydney Moulds.

== Etymology ==
The specific epithet similis (Latin: ‘resembling’) refers to the similarity between this species and Pauropsalta extrema.

== Description ==
The length of the forewing is 18–25 mm.

== Distribution and habitat ==
The species occurs widely in the Kimberley region of Western Australia, the range extending eastwards into the Top End of the Northern Territory. The associated habitat is eucalypt woodland, especially along rivers.

== Behaviour ==
Adult males may be heard from October to February, emitting repetitive chirping and clicking calls.
