= Pauropsalta extrema =

Scientific classification
- Kingdom: Animalia
- Phylum: Arthropoda
- Clade: Pancrustacea
- Class: Insecta
- Order: Hemiptera
- Suborder: Auchenorrhyncha
- Family: Cicadidae
- Genus: Pauropsalta
- Species: P. extrema

Binomial name
- Pauropsalta extrema (Distant, 1892)

Species of true bug

Pauropsalta extrema is a cicada, in the Cicadettini tribe of the cicada family, Cicadidae, first described by William Lucas Distant in 1892, as Melampsalta extrema, and transferred to the genus, Pauropsalta, in 1904 by Frederic Webster Goding and Walter Wilson Froggatt.
