= Haemopsalta eximia =

Scientific classification
- Kingdom: Animalia
- Phylum: Arthropoda
- Clade: Pancrustacea
- Class: Insecta
- Order: Hemiptera
- Suborder: Auchenorrhyncha
- Family: Cicadidae
- Genus: Haemopsalta
- Species: H. eximia

Binomial name
- Haemopsalta eximia Emery & Emery, 2021

Species of cicada

Haemopsalta eximia is a species of cicada, also known as the Dharug squeaker, in the true cicada family, Cicadettinae subfamily and Cicadettini tribe. It is endemic to Australia. It was described in 2021 by Australian entomologists Nathan J. Emery and David L. Emery.

== Description ==
The length of the forewing is 18–23 mm.

== Distribution and habitat ==
The species occurs in the vicinity of the Macdonald River, north-west of Sydney, in the Hawkesbury River catchment of New South Wales. Its associated habitat is open eucalypt forest, with Corymbia eximia (yellow bloodwood) trees, on ridges.

== Behaviour ==
Adult males are heard from October to January, clinging to the trunks and branches of eucalypts, uttering repetitive dit-it-it-derrrrrrr calls.
