= Xeropsalta aridula =

Scientific classification
- Kingdom: Animalia
- Phylum: Arthropoda
- Clade: Pancrustacea
- Class: Insecta
- Order: Hemiptera
- Suborder: Auchenorrhyncha
- Family: Cicadidae
- Genus: Xeropsalta
- Species: X. aridula

Binomial name
- Xeropsalta aridula Ewart, 2018

Species of cicada

Xeropsalta aridula is a species of cicada, also known as the Simpson Desert grass-shaker, in the true cicada family, Cicadettinae subfamily and Cicadettini tribe. The species is endemic to Australia. It was described in 2018 by Australian entomologist Anthony Ewart.

== Description ==
The length of the forewing is 10–13 mm.

== Distribution and habitat ==
The species is only known from western Queensland, at the eastern edge of the Simpson Desert. The associated habitat is open grassland.

== Behaviour ==
Adult males may be heard in February, clinging to the stems of grasses, emitting low-pitched, maraca-like calls.
