= Pauropsalta adelphe =

Scientific classification
- Kingdom: Animalia
- Phylum: Arthropoda
- Clade: Pancrustacea
- Class: Insecta
- Order: Hemiptera
- Suborder: Auchenorrhyncha
- Family: Cicadidae
- Genus: Pauropsalta
- Species: P. adelphe

Binomial name
- Pauropsalta adelphe Owen & Moulds, 2016

Species of cicada

Pauropsalta adelphe is a species of cicada, also known as the Top End frog squawker, in the true cicada family, Cicadettinae subfamily and Cicadettini tribe. It is endemic to Australia. It was described in 2016 by entomologists Christopher Owen and Maxwell Sydney Moulds.

== Etymology ==
The specific epithet adelphe (Greek: ‘sister’) refers to the close relationship between this species and Pauropsalta agasta.

== Description ==
The length of the forewing is 29–32 mm.

== Distribution and habitat ==
The species occurs in the Top End of the Northern Territory. The associated habitat is eucalypt woodland.

== Behaviour ==
Adult males may be heard from October to January, clinging to the trunks of eucalypts, emitting deep, frog-like, croaking songs.
