= Platypsalta mixta =

Scientific classification
- Kingdom: Animalia
- Phylum: Arthropoda
- Clade: Pancrustacea
- Class: Insecta
- Order: Hemiptera
- Suborder: Auchenorrhyncha
- Family: Cicadidae
- Genus: Platypsalta
- Species: P. mixta

Binomial name
- Platypsalta mixta (Distant, 1914)

Synonyms
- Pauropsalta mixta Distant, 1914

Species of cicada

Platypsalta mixta is a species of cicada, also known as the black scrub-buzzer, in the true cicada family, Cicadettinae subfamily and Cicadettini tribe. The species is endemic to Australia, where it occurs in low, open, grassy woodland habitats in New South Wales and southern Queensland. It was described in 1914 by English entomologist William Lucas Distant.
