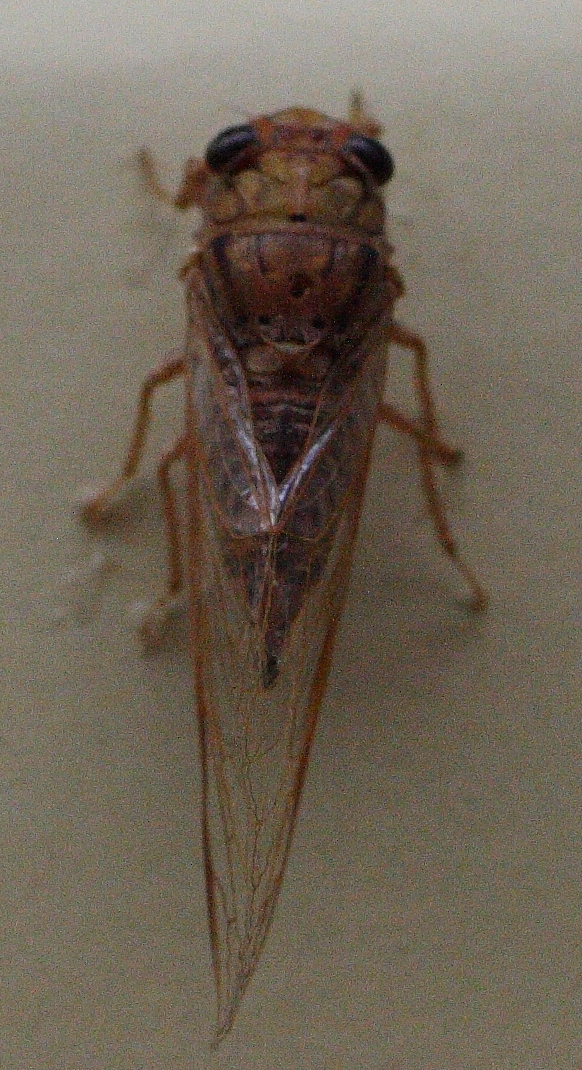

Scientific classification
- Kingdom: Animalia
- Phylum: Arthropoda
- Clade: Pancrustacea
- Class: Insecta
- Order: Hemiptera
- Suborder: Auchenorrhyncha
- Family: Cicadidae
- Genus: Birrima
- Species: B. varians

Binomial name
- Birrima varians (Germar, 1834)

Synonyms
- Cicada varians Germar, 1834

= Birrima varians =

Species of cicada

Birrima varians is a species or species complex of cicadas, also known as the black tree-ticker, in the true cicada family, Cicadettinae subfamily and Cicadettini tribe. It is endemic to Australia. It was described in 1834 by German entomologist Ernst Friedrich Germar.

== Description ==
The length of the forewing is 24–32 mm.

== Distribution and habitat ==
The species complex is found in subtropical and warm temperate areas of eastern Australia, from the Atherton Tableland in north-eastern Queensland, southwards to Armidale in northern New South Wales. The associated habitat is open forest, especially with Eucalyptus tereticornis.

== Behaviour ==
Adults may be heard from August to March, sometimes to May, clinging to trees, shrubs and artificial structures, or flying about actively, uttering slow, repeated zeeeet calls.

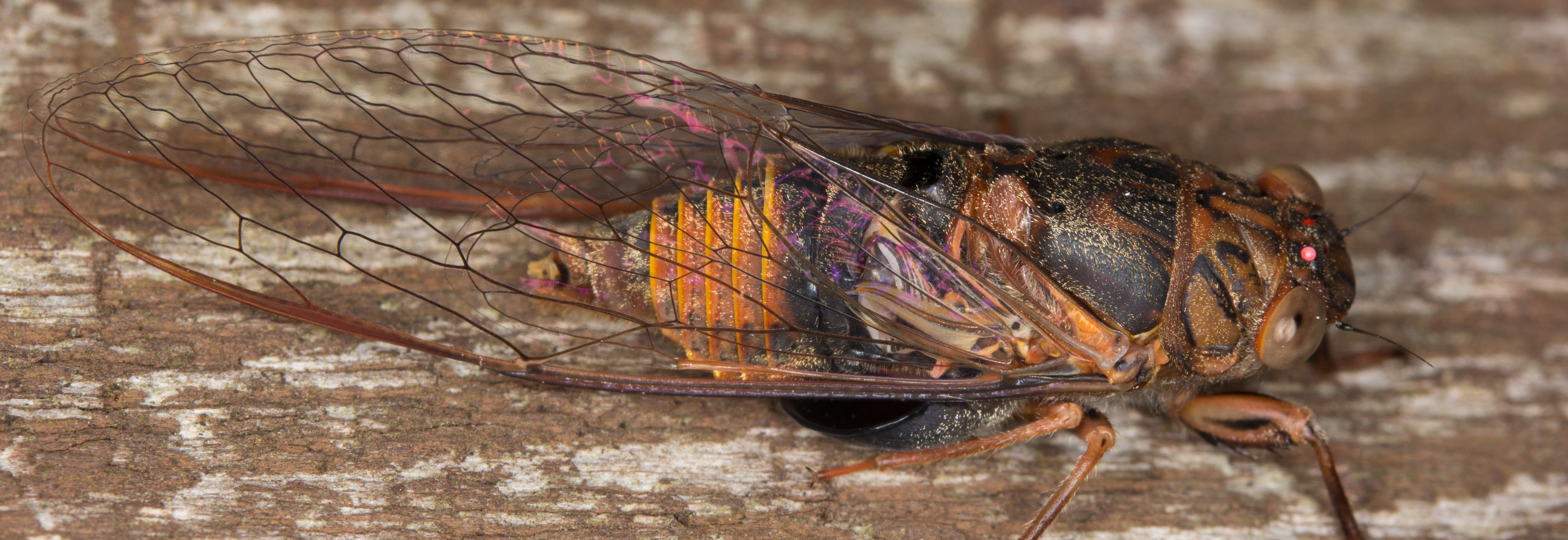
Black Tree-ticker
