= Myopsalta mackinlayi =

Scientific classification
- Kingdom: Animalia
- Phylum: Arthropoda
- Clade: Pancrustacea
- Class: Insecta
- Order: Hemiptera
- Suborder: Auchenorrhyncha
- Family: Cicadidae
- Genus: Myopsalta
- Species: M. mackinlayi

Binomial name
- Myopsalta mackinlayi (Distant, 1882)

Synonyms
- Melampsalta mackinlayi Distant, 1882; Cicadetta mackinlayi (Distant, 1882)

Species of cicada

Myopsalta mackinlayi is a species of cicada, also known as a fence buzzer, in the true cicada family, Cicadettinae subfamily and Cicadettini tribe. It is endemic to Australia. It was described in 1882 by English entomologist William Lucas Distant.

== Description ==
The length of the forewing is 15–18 mm.

== Distribution and habitat ==
The species occurs in south-eastern Queensland from Moranbah southwards through Greater Brisbane into north-eastern New South Wales, as far south as Sydney. Associated habitats include open woodland and the margins of open forest, as well as pastoral land with scattered trees.

== Behaviour ==
Adult males may be heard from September to March, clinging to tree-trunks and fence-posts, mainly within 2 m of the ground, uttering repetitive, buzzing calls.
