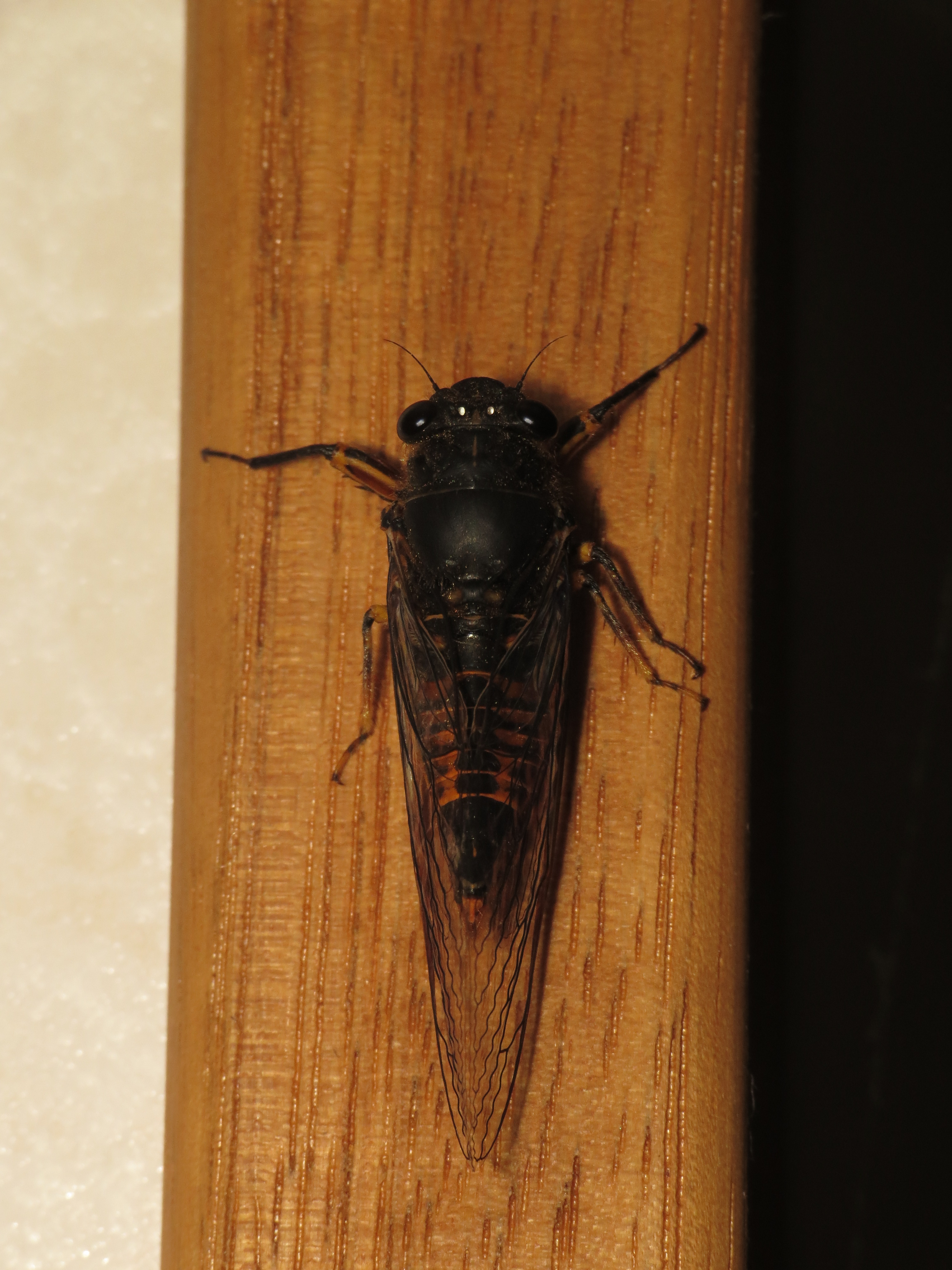

Scientific classification
- Kingdom: Animalia
- Phylum: Arthropoda
- Clade: Pancrustacea
- Class: Insecta
- Order: Hemiptera
- Suborder: Auchenorrhyncha
- Family: Cicadidae
- Genus: Pauropsalta
- Species: P. mneme

Binomial name
- Pauropsalta mneme (Walker, 1850)

Synonyms
- Cicada mneme Walker, 1850; Cicada antica Walker, 1850; Pauropsalta leurens Goding & Froggatt, 1904

= Pauropsalta mneme =

Species of cicada

Pauropsalta mneme is a species of cicada, also known as the alarm clock squawker, in the true cicada family, Cicadettinae subfamily and Cicadettini tribe. It is endemic to Australia. It was described in 1850 by English entomologist Francis Walker.

== Description ==
The length of the forewing is 20–26 mm.

== Distribution and habitat ==
The species occurs in south-eastern Australia from Applethorpe in south-east Queensland, southwards along the eastern side of the Great Dividing Range through New South Wales and the Australian Capital Territory, and into Victoria as far west as the Grampians, with an isolated population in the Mount Lofty Ranges of South Australia. Associated habitats include open eucalypt forest and temperate heathland on sandstone, granite or metasedimentary rocks.

== Behaviour ==
Adult males may be heard from September to February, clinging to tree trunks, emitting repetitive calls characterised by a series of soft clicks followed by a rattling buzz, a sound like that of a mechanical alarm clock.

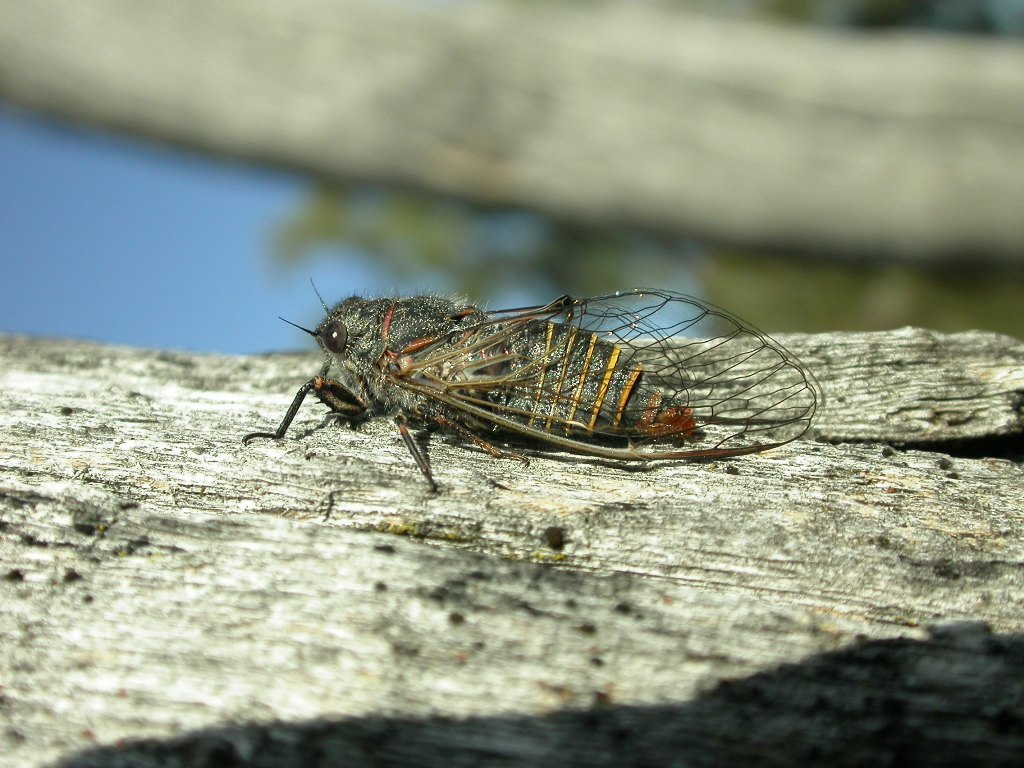
