= Myopsalta xerograsidia =

Scientific classification
- Kingdom: Animalia
- Phylum: Arthropoda
- Clade: Pancrustacea
- Class: Insecta
- Order: Hemiptera
- Suborder: Auchenorrhyncha
- Family: Cicadidae
- Genus: Myopsalta
- Species: M. xerograsidia

Binomial name
- Myopsalta xerograsidia Popple, 2017

Species of cicada

Myopsalta xerograsidia is a species of cicada, also known as the fishing reel buzzer, in the true cicada family, Cicadettinae subfamily and Cicadettini tribe. It is endemic to Australia. It was described in 2017 by Australian entomologist Lindsay Popple.

== Etymology ==
The specific epithet xerograsidia is a compound derived from Greek xeros (dry) and grasidi (grass), referring to the cicadas’ favoured habitat.

== Description ==
The length of the forewing is 16–18 mm.

== Distribution and habitat ==
The species has an extensive range across the drier parts of northern Australia. Associated habitats include grasslands and grassy woodlands.

== Behaviour ==
Adult males may be heard from October to March, uttering high-pitched, wavering, buzzing calls which have been likened to the sound of a fishing reel being wound.
