= Myopsalta umbra =

Scientific classification
- Kingdom: Animalia
- Phylum: Arthropoda
- Clade: Pancrustacea
- Class: Insecta
- Order: Hemiptera
- Suborder: Auchenorrhyncha
- Family: Cicadidae
- Genus: Myopsalta
- Species: M. umbra

Binomial name
- Myopsalta umbra Popple, 2017

Species of cicada

Myopsalta umbra is a species of cicada, also known as the olive vine buzzer, in the true cicada family, Cicadettinae subfamily and Cicadettini tribe. It is endemic to Australia. It was described in 2017 by Australian entomologist Lindsay Popple.

== Etymology ==
The specific epithet umbra (Latin: ‘shadow’ or ‘shade’) refers to the cicadas' heavily shaded habitat.

== Description ==
The length of the forewing is 15–17 mm.

== Distribution and habitat ==
The species occurs in south-eastern Queensland in scattered populations from Mount Moffatt and Theodore southwards to Boonah. The associated habitat is undisturbed areas of semi-ephemeral vine thicket.

== Behaviour ==
Adult males may be heard from October to January, sitting within tangles of vines, uttering repetitive buzzing calls.
