= Mugadina hamiltoni =

Scientific classification
- Kingdom: Animalia
- Phylum: Arthropoda
- Clade: Pancrustacea
- Class: Insecta
- Order: Hemiptera
- Suborder: Auchenorrhyncha
- Family: Cicadidae
- Genus: Mugadina
- Species: M. hamiltoni

Binomial name
- Mugadina hamiltoni Ewart, 2022

Species of cicada

Mugadina hamiltoni is a species of cicada, also known as the Hamilton grass-ticker, in the true cicada family, Cicadettinae subfamily and Cicadettini tribe. It is endemic to Australia. It was described in 2022 by Australian entomologist Anthony Ewart.

== Description ==
The length of the forewing is 11–13 mm.

== Distribution and habitat ==
The species occurs from Winton westwards to Boulia in Central West Queensland. Its associated habitat is open grassland.

== Behaviour ==
Adult males are heard in January and February, clinging to grass stems, uttering rapid ticking calls.
