= Pauropsalta infrasila =

Scientific classification
- Kingdom: Animalia
- Phylum: Arthropoda
- Clade: Pancrustacea
- Class: Insecta
- Order: Hemiptera
- Suborder: Auchenorrhyncha
- Family: Cicadidae
- Genus: Pauropsalta
- Species: P. infrasila

Binomial name
- Pauropsalta infrasila Moulds, 1987

Species of cicada

Pauropsalta infrasila is a species of cicada, also known as the tropical orange squawker, in the true cicada family, Cicadettinae subfamily and Cicadettini tribe. It is endemic to Australia. It was described in 1987 by Australian entomologist Maxwell Sydney Moulds.

== Description ==
The length of the forewing is 23–31 mm.

== Distribution and habitat ==
The species occurs in northern Queensland from the tip of Cape York southwards to Cooktown and westwards to Georgetown, with an isolated population on the Blackdown Tableland in central Queensland. The holotype specimen was collected at Isabella Falls, some 30 km north of Cooktown. The associated habitat is tropical eucalypt woodland, especially areas with a grassy understorey.

== Behaviour ==
Adult males may be heard from October to May, clinging to the trunks of eucalypts, emitting short, repetitive calls.
