= Heremusina pipatio =

Scientific classification
- Kingdom: Animalia
- Phylum: Arthropoda
- Clade: Pancrustacea
- Class: Insecta
- Order: Hemiptera
- Suborder: Auchenorrhyncha
- Family: Cicadidae
- Genus: Heremusina
- Species: H. pipatio

Binomial name
- Heremusina pipatio Ewart, 2018

Species of cicada

Heremusina pipatio is a species of cicada, also known as the Cloncurry watch-winder, in the true cicada family, Cicadettinae subfamily and Cicadettini tribe. It is endemic to Australia. It was described in 2018 by Australian entomologist Anthony Ewart.

== Description ==
The length of the forewing is 11–13 mm.

== Distribution and habitat ==
The species occurs in the vicinity of the town of Cloncurry in north-west Queensland. Its associated habitat is semi-arid grassland.

== Behaviour ==
Adult males are heard in January and February, uttering rapid, high-pitched zipping calls.
