= Tamasa caverna =

Scientific classification
- Kingdom: Animalia
- Phylum: Arthropoda
- Clade: Pancrustacea
- Class: Insecta
- Order: Hemiptera
- Suborder: Auchenorrhyncha
- Family: Cicadidae
- Genus: Tamasa
- Species: T. caverna

Binomial name
- Tamasa caverna Moulds & Olive, 2014

Species of cicada

Tamasa caverna, also known as the boulder bunyip, is a species of cicada in the true cicada family. It is endemic to Australia. It was described in 2014 by Australian entomologists Maxwell Sydney Moulds and John C. Olive.

== Description ==
The length of the forewing is 32–36 mm.

== Distribution and habitat ==
The species is known only from Black Mountain, near Cooktown, on the Cape York Peninsula of Far North Queensland. The associated habitat is rocky and dominated by large granite boulders.

== Behaviour ==
Adults have been observed in January, clinging to sheltered positions on the shadowed sides of the boulders, uttering powerful, pulsing, buzzing calls.
