= Myopsalta longicauda =

Scientific classification
- Kingdom: Animalia
- Phylum: Arthropoda
- Clade: Pancrustacea
- Class: Insecta
- Order: Hemiptera
- Suborder: Auchenorrhyncha
- Family: Cicadidae
- Genus: Myopsalta
- Species: M. longicauda

Binomial name
- Myopsalta longicauda Popple, 2017

Species of cicada

Myopsalta longicauda is a species of cicada, also known as the wavering buzzer, in the true cicada family, Cicadettinae subfamily and Cicadettini tribe. It is endemic to Australia. It was described in 2017 by Australian entomologist Lindsay Popple.

== Etymology ==
The specific epithet longicauda comes from Latin longus and caudus, meaning ‘long-tailed’, with reference to the long ovipositors of the females.

== Description ==
The length of the forewing is 16–18 mm.

== Distribution and habitat ==
The species occurs in inland eastern Australia from the Expedition Range in central Queensland southwards to Stockinbingal in southern New South Wales. The associated habitat is dry woodland on poor sandy soils.

== Behaviour ==
Adult males may be heard from October to January, clinging high on eucalypts and acacias, uttering high-pitched, wavering, buzzing calls.
