= Pauropsalta sinavilla =

Scientific classification
- Kingdom: Animalia
- Phylum: Arthropoda
- Clade: Pancrustacea
- Class: Insecta
- Order: Hemiptera
- Suborder: Auchenorrhyncha
- Family: Cicadidae
- Genus: Pauropsalta
- Species: P. sinavilla

Binomial name
- Pauropsalta sinavilla Owen & Moulds, 2016

Species of cicada

Pauropsalta sinavilla is a species of cicada, also known as the Pilbara squawker, in the true cicada family, Cicadettinae subfamily and Cicadettini tribe. It is endemic to Australia. It was described in 2016 by entomologists Christopher Owen and Maxwell Sydney Moulds.

== Etymology ==
The specific epithet sinavilla is a compound derived from Latin sina (‘grumpy’ or ‘irritated’) referring to the sound of the song, and villa (house) referring to the type locality of House Creek.

== Description ==
The length of the forewing is 17–22 mm.

== Distribution and habitat ==
The species is known only from the western Pilbara region of north-western Western Australia between the catchments of the Ashburton and Sherlock Rivers. The holotype specimen was collected at House Creek, some 60 km east of Nanutarra Roadhouse. The associated habitat is eucalypt woodland along watercourses.

== Behaviour ==
Adult males may be heard from October to February after rainfall, clinging to the trunks and upper branches of eucalypts, emitting low-pitched, buzzing calls.
