= Auscala =

Scientific classification
- Kingdom: Animalia
- Phylum: Arthropoda
- Clade: Pancrustacea
- Class: Insecta
- Order: Hemiptera
- Suborder: Auchenorrhyncha
- Family: Cicadidae
- Subfamily: Cicadettinae
- Tribe: Cicadettini
- Genus: Auscala; Moulds, 2012

Genus of cicadas

Auscala is a genus of cicadas in the family Cicadidae, subfamily Cicadettinae and tribe Cicadettini. It was described in 2012 by Australian entomologist Maxwell Sydney Moulds. The cicadas are found in the dryer areas of south-western and south-eastern Australia.

== Etymology ==
The genus name Auscala combines ‘Aus' (for 'Australia’) with Latin cala (a piece of wood), alluding to the songs of the male cicadas, which sound like creaking tree branches.

== Species ==
As of 2025 there were two described species in the genus:

- Auscala flammea Emery, Emery & Hutchinson, 2020 (Red Mallee Creaker)
- Auscala spinosa (Goding & Froggat, 1904) (Creaking Branch Cicada)
