= Pauropsalta juncta =

Scientific classification
- Kingdom: Animalia
- Phylum: Arthropoda
- Clade: Pancrustacea
- Class: Insecta
- Order: Hemiptera
- Suborder: Auchenorrhyncha
- Family: Cicadidae
- Genus: Pauropsalta
- Species: P. juncta

Binomial name
- Pauropsalta juncta Owen & Moulds, 2016

Species of cicada

Pauropsalta juncta is a species of cicada, also known as the Stirling squawker, in the true cicada family, Cicadettinae subfamily and Cicadettini tribe. It is endemic to Australia. It was described in 2016 by entomologists Christopher Owen and Maxwell Sydney Moulds.

== Etymology ==
The specific epithet juncta, from Latin junctus (‘unite’ or ‘join’), is an anatomical reference to the fusion of forewing vein stems.

== Description ==
The length of the forewing is 18–21 mm.

== Distribution and habitat ==
The species is known only from south-west Western Australia, from the Stirling Range and from 50 km south-west of Arthur River. The associated habitat is eucalypt forest.

== Behaviour ==
Adult males may be heard in January, clinging to the upper branches of tall eucalypts, emitting rattling and buzzing songs terminated by a ‘twang’.
