= Myopsalta leona =

Scientific classification
- Kingdom: Animalia
- Phylum: Arthropoda
- Clade: Pancrustacea
- Class: Insecta
- Order: Hemiptera
- Suborder: Auchenorrhyncha
- Family: Cicadidae
- Genus: Myopsalta
- Species: M. leona

Binomial name
- Myopsalta leona Popple, 2017

Species of cicada

Myopsalta leona is a species of cicada, also known as the black brigalow buzzer, in the true cicada family, Cicadettinae subfamily and Cicadettini tribe. It is endemic to Australia. It was described in 2017 by Australian entomologist Lindsay Popple.

== Etymology ==
The specific epithet leona comes from Latin for ‘lion’, referring to the amplitude modulation in the calling song making it resemble the roar of a lion, when heard in the output of a bat detector.

== Description ==
The length of the forewing is 14–16 mm.

== Distribution and habitat ==
The species occurs from the Simpson Desert in western Queensland eastwards and southwards to southern New South Wales. Associated habitats include brigalow shrubland, mixed eucalypt woodland and rural parkland.

== Behaviour ==
Adult males may be heard from October to February, clinging to the stems of trees and shrubs, uttering high-pitched buzzing and ticking calls.
