= Myopsalta chrysopedia =

Scientific classification
- Kingdom: Animalia
- Phylum: Arthropoda
- Clade: Pancrustacea
- Class: Insecta
- Order: Hemiptera
- Suborder: Auchenorrhyncha
- Family: Cicadidae
- Genus: Myopsalta
- Species: M. chrysopedia

Binomial name
- Myopsalta chrysopedia Popple, 2017

Species of cicada

Myopsalta chrysopedia is a species of cicada, also known as the black sandplain buzzer, in the true cicada family, Cicadettinae subfamily and Cicadettini tribe. It is endemic to Australia. It was described in 2017 by Australian entomologist Lindsay Popple.

== Etymology ==
The specific epithet chrysopedia is a compound derived from Greek chrysos (gold) and pedia (of the feet), referring to the Goldfields region of Western Australia where many specimens were collected.

== Description ==
The length of the forewing is 17–18 mm.

== Distribution and habitat ==
The species occurs in southern Western Australia from Laverton southwards to Salmon Gums, Balladonia and Cape Arid National Park. The holotype specimen was collected at Kalgoorlie. Associated habitats include open shrubland and mallee on sandplains.

== Behaviour ==
Adult males may be seen from September to January.
