= Xeropsalta festiva =

Scientific classification
- Kingdom: Animalia
- Phylum: Arthropoda
- Clade: Pancrustacea
- Class: Insecta
- Order: Hemiptera
- Suborder: Auchenorrhyncha
- Family: Cicadidae
- Genus: Xeropsalta
- Species: X. festiva

Binomial name
- Xeropsalta festiva (Distant, 1907)

Synonyms
- Urabunana festiva Distant, 1907; Mugadina festiva (Distant, 1907)

Species of cicada

Xeropsalta festiva is a species of cicada, also known as the bee gleeper, in the true cicada family, Cicadettinae subfamily and Cicadettini tribe. The species is endemic to Australia. It was described in 1907 by English entomologist William Lucas Distant.

== Description ==
The length of the forewing is 13–15 mm.

== Distribution and habitat ==
The species occurs in south-eastern inland Australia from Hillston in New South Wales south-west to Nhill in Victoria. Associated habitats include open grassland and grassy woodland.

== Behaviour ==
Adult males may be heard from October to January, clinging to the stems of grasses, emitting monotonously repeated “gleep” calls.
