= Myopsalta crucifera =

Scientific classification
- Kingdom: Animalia
- Phylum: Arthropoda
- Clade: Pancrustacea
- Class: Insecta
- Order: Hemiptera
- Suborder: Auchenorrhyncha
- Family: Cicadidae
- Genus: Myopsalta
- Species: M. crucifera

Binomial name
- Myopsalta crucifera (Ashton, 1912)

Synonyms
- Melampsalta crucifera Ashton, 1912; Cicadetta crucifera (Ashton, 1912)

Species of cicada

Myopsalta crucifera is a species of cicada, also known as the brown buzzer, in the true cicada family, Cicadettinae subfamily and Cicadettini tribe. It is endemic to Australia. It was described in 1912 by Australian entomologist Julian Howard Ashton.

== Description ==
The length of the forewing is 16–18 mm.

== Distribution and habitat ==
The species occurs in eastern Australia, east of the Great Dividing Range, from tropical Laura in Far North Queensland southwards to subtropical Kyogle in the Northern Rivers region of New South Wales. Associated habitats include open grassland and the margins of grassy forests and woodlands.

== Behaviour ==
Adult males may be heard from late September to April, uttering repetitive buzzing calls during bright sunshine. The species is considered to be a sugarcane pest.
