= Myopsalta =

Scientific classification
- Kingdom: Animalia
- Phylum: Arthropoda
- Clade: Pancrustacea
- Class: Insecta
- Order: Hemiptera
- Suborder: Auchenorrhyncha
- Family: Cicadidae
- Subfamily: Cicadettinae
- Genus: Myopsalta; Moulds, 2012

Genus of cicadas

Myopsalta is a genus of cicadas, mostly known as buzzers, in the family Cicadidae, subfamily Cicadettinae and tribe Cicadettini. It was described in 2012 by Australian entomologist Maxwell Sydney Moulds.

== Etymology ==
The genus name Myopsalta is a combination derived from Greek myo (‘shut’ or ‘close’), with reference to the opercula that close off the tympanal cavity, and psalta (from Latin psaltria - a female harpist), which is a suffix traditionally used in the generic names of cicadas.

== Species ==
As of 2025 there were 24 described species in the genus:

- Myopsalta albiventris Popple, 2017 (Pale-bellied Grass Buzzer)
- Myopsalta atrata (Goding and Froggatt, 1904) (Orange-bellied Buzzer)
- Myopsalta bassiana Popple, 2017 (Bassian Buzzer)
- Myopsalta binotata (Goding and Froggatt, 1904) (Robust Smoky Buzzer)
- Myopsalta bisonabilis Popple and Stolarski, 2024 (Adelaide Buzzer)
- Myopsalta chrysopedia Popple, 2017 (Black Sandplain Buzzer)
- Myopsalta coolahensis Emery, Emery and Popple, 2015 (Coolah Grass Buzzer)
- Myopsalta crucifera (Ashton, 1914) (Brown Buzzer)
- Myopsalta gordoni Popple, 2017 (Black Acacia Buzzer)
- Myopsalta lactea (Distant, 1905) (Dark Smoky Buzzer)
- Myopsalta leona Popple, 2017 (Black Brigalow Buzzer)
- Myopsalta libritor Emery, Emery and Popple, 2015 (Coolah Repeater)
- Myopsalta longicauda Popple, 2017 (Wavering Buzzer)
- Myopsalta mackinlayi (Distant, 1882) (Fence Buzzer)
- Myopsalta majurae Popple, 2017 (Mount Ainslie Buzzer)
- Myopsalta melanobasis Popple, 2017 (Broad-winged Buzzer)
- Myopsalta parvula Popple, 2017 (Black Mountain Tinkler)
- Myopsalta platyptera Popple, 2017 (Theodore Chirper)
- Myopsalta riverina Popple, 2017 (Eastern Mallee Buzzer)
- Myopsalta septa Popple, 2017 (Warwick Grass Buzzer)
- Myopsalta umbra Popple, 2017 (Olive Vine Buzzer)
- Myopsalta waterhousei (Distant, 1905) (Smoky Buzzer)
- Myopsalta wollomombii (Coombs, 1995) (New England Grass Buzzer)
- Myopsalta xerograsidia Popple, 2017 (Fishing Reel Buzzer)
