= Pauropsalta katherina =

Scientific classification
- Kingdom: Animalia
- Phylum: Arthropoda
- Clade: Pancrustacea
- Class: Insecta
- Order: Hemiptera
- Suborder: Auchenorrhyncha
- Family: Cicadidae
- Genus: Pauropsalta
- Species: P. katherina

Binomial name
- Pauropsalta katherina Owen & Moulds, 2016

Species of cicada

Pauropsalta katherina is a species of cicada, also known as Kathy's squawker, in the true cicada family, Cicadettinae subfamily and Cicadettini tribe. It is endemic to Australia. It was described in 2016 by entomologists Christopher Owen and Maxwell Sydney Moulds.

== Etymology ==
The specific epithet katherina, from Latinised Greek alkaterine (‘pure’), the origin of the English name ‘Katherine’, thus honouring Kathy Hill for her contributions to the systematics of Australian cicadas.

== Description ==
The length of the forewing is 16–20 mm.

== Distribution and habitat ==
The species occurs in arid areas of inland Australia, from Western Australia eastwards through the Northern Territory to the eastern edge of the Simpson Desert in western Queensland. The associated habitat is spinifex grassland.

== Behaviour ==
Adult males may be heard in January and February, following rainfall, clinging to spinifex grass stems, emitting irregular, loud, low-pitched zeeep calls.
