= Myopsalta wollomombii =

Scientific classification
- Kingdom: Animalia
- Phylum: Arthropoda
- Clade: Pancrustacea
- Class: Insecta
- Order: Hemiptera
- Suborder: Auchenorrhyncha
- Family: Cicadidae
- Genus: Myopsalta
- Species: M. wollomombii

Binomial name
- Myopsalta wollomombii (Coombs, 1995)

Synonyms
- Urabunana wollomombii Coombs, 1995

Species of cicada

Myopsalta wollomombii is a species of cicada, also known as the New England grass buzzer, in the true cicada family, Cicadettinae subfamily and Cicadettini tribe. It is endemic to Australia. It was described in 1995 by Australian entomologist Marc Coombs.

== Description ==
The length of the forewing is 15–16 mm.

== Distribution and habitat ==
The species occurs from the vicinity of Inglewood and Applethorpe in southern Queensland southwards to the Wollomombi River near Armidale and the Hunter Valley in New South Wales. Associated habitats include open grassland and grassy woodland.

== Behaviour ==
Adult males may be heard from November to January, uttering repetitive buzzing calls during bright sunshine.
