= Pauropsalta herveyensis =

Scientific classification
- Kingdom: Animalia
- Phylum: Arthropoda
- Clade: Pancrustacea
- Class: Insecta
- Order: Hemiptera
- Suborder: Auchenorrhyncha
- Family: Cicadidae
- Genus: Pauropsalta
- Species: P. herveyensis

Binomial name
- Pauropsalta herveyensis Owen & Moulds, 2016

Species of cicada

Pauropsalta herveyensis is a species of cicada, also known as the Herveys Range squawker, in the true cicada family, Cicadettinae subfamily and Cicadettini tribe. It is endemic to Australia. It was described in 2016 by entomologists Christopher Owen and Maxwell Sydney Moulds.

== Etymology ==
The specific epithet herveyensis refers to the type locality.

== Description ==
The length of the forewing is 27–31 mm.

== Distribution and habitat ==
The species is known only from north-eastern Queensland, from the Hervey Range northwards to the eastern slopes of the Paluma Range, near Townsville. The associated habitat is eucalypt woodland.

== Behaviour ==
Adult males may be heard in January in sunny conditions, clinging to the main trunks and upper branches of eucalypts, emitting songs characterised by a long buzz followed by a series of chirps.
