= Pauropsalta ewarti =

Scientific classification
- Kingdom: Animalia
- Phylum: Arthropoda
- Clade: Pancrustacea
- Class: Insecta
- Order: Hemiptera
- Suborder: Auchenorrhyncha
- Family: Cicadidae
- Genus: Pauropsalta
- Species: P. ewarti

Binomial name
- Pauropsalta ewarti Owen & Moulds, 2016

Species of cicada

Pauropsalta ewarti is a species of cicada, also known as the Herberton squawker, in the true cicada family, Cicadettinae subfamily and Cicadettini tribe. It is endemic to Australia. It was described in 2016 by entomologists Christopher Owen and Maxwell Sydney Moulds.

== Etymology ==
The specific epithet ewarti honours Tony Ewart for his significant contributions to Australian cicada taxonomy.

== Description ==
The length of the forewing is 27–31 mm.

== Distribution and habitat ==
The species is known only from Far North Queensland, from Danbulla and the Herberton Range southwards to near Gordonvale. The associated habitat is eucalypt woodland.

== Behaviour ==
Adult males may be heard from December to February, clinging to the main trunks and upper branches of eucalypts, emitting songs characterised by a long buzz followed by a series of loud chirps.
