= Myopsalta gordoni =

Scientific classification
- Kingdom: Animalia
- Phylum: Arthropoda
- Clade: Pancrustacea
- Class: Insecta
- Order: Hemiptera
- Suborder: Auchenorrhyncha
- Family: Cicadidae
- Genus: Myopsalta
- Species: M. gordoni

Binomial name
- Myopsalta gordoni Popple, 2017

Species of cicada

Myopsalta gordoni is a species of cicada, also known as the black acacia buzzer, in the true cicada family, Cicadettinae subfamily and Cicadettini tribe. It is endemic to Australia. It was described in 2017 by Australian entomologist Lindsay Popple.

== Etymology ==
The specific epithet gordoni honours David Gordon, grazier, conservationist and botanical collector, who established the Myall Park Botanic Garden, which hosts a high diversity of cicadas.

== Description ==
The length of the forewing is 14–16 mm.

== Distribution and habitat ==
The species occurs in southern Queensland from Millmerran westwards to Morven and Charleville. Associated habitats include mixed acacia woodland and mulga shrubland.

== Behaviour ==
Adult males may be heard from December to February, clinging to the branches and stems of acacias and other small trees, uttering high-frequency calls, alternating short and long phrases.
