= Haemopsalta flammeata =

Scientific classification
- Kingdom: Animalia
- Phylum: Arthropoda
- Clade: Pancrustacea
- Class: Insecta
- Order: Hemiptera
- Suborder: Auchenorrhyncha
- Family: Cicadidae
- Genus: Haemopsalta
- Species: H. flammeata

Binomial name
- Haemopsalta flammeata Owen & Moulds, 2016

Species of cicada

Haemopsalta flammeata is a species of cicada, also known as the sunray squeaker, in the true cicada family, Cicadettinae subfamily and Cicadettini tribe. It is endemic to Australia. It was described in 2016 by entomologists Christopher Owen and Maxwell Sydney Moulds.

== Etymology ==
The specific epithet flammeata is derived from Latin flamma (‘flame’), referring to the red colouration on the abdomen.

== Description ==
The length of the forewing is 19–23 mm.

== Distribution and habitat ==
The species occurs in elevated areas of Central Queensland from the Drummond Range southwards to the Expedition Range, including the Blackdown Tableland. Its associated habitat is eucalypt forest on sandstone plateaus.

== Behaviour ==
Adult males cling to the foliage and branches of eucalypts, uttering repetitive, deep, metallic dit-derrrrrrr calls.
