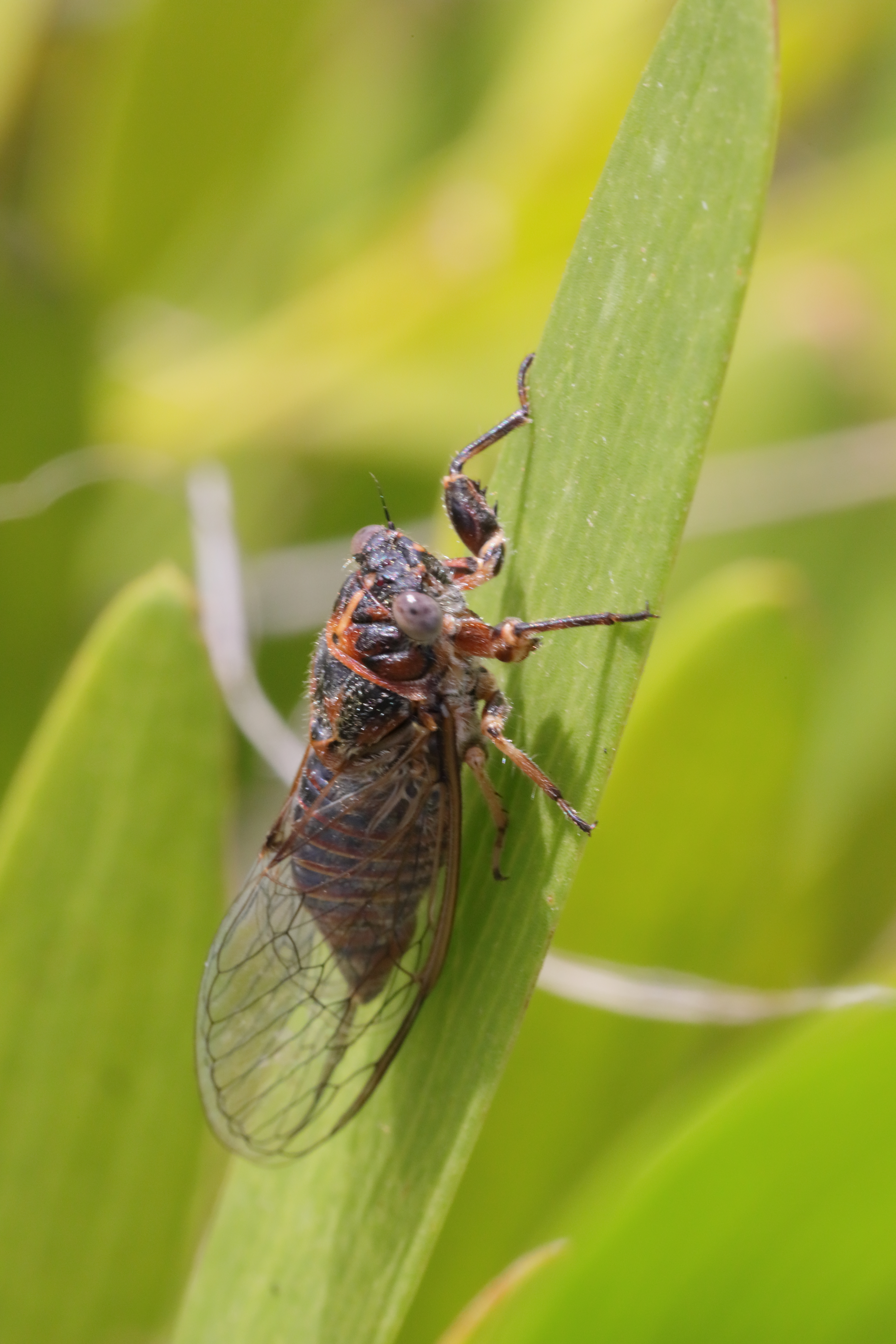

Scientific classification
- Kingdom: Animalia
- Phylum: Arthropoda
- Clade: Pancrustacea
- Class: Insecta
- Order: Hemiptera
- Suborder: Auchenorrhyncha
- Family: Cicadidae
- Genus: Haemopsalta
- Species: H. aktites

Binomial name
- Haemopsalta aktites (Ewart, 1989)

Synonyms
- Pauropsalta aktites Ewart, 1989

= Haemopsalta aktites =

Species of cicada

Haemopsalta aktites is a species of cicada, also known as the beach squeaker, in the true cicada family, Cicadettinae subfamily and Cicadettini tribe. It is endemic to Australia. It was described in 1989 by Australian entomologist Anthony Ewart.

== Etymology ==
The specific epithet aktites comes from Latin aktites (shore or coast dweller).

== Description ==
The length of the forewing is 14–17 mm.

== Distribution and habitat ==
The species occurs along the coast of eastern Australia, from Great Keppel Island, Central Queensland, southwards to Congo, New South Wales. Its associated habitat is mainly coastal sheoak woodland, generally within 50 m of the beach, and occasionally dune grasses or mangroves.

== Behaviour ==
Adult males are heard from September to May, uttering repetitive, monotonous, chirping calls.
