= Heremusina udeoecetes =

Scientific classification
- Kingdom: Animalia
- Phylum: Arthropoda
- Clade: Pancrustacea
- Class: Insecta
- Order: Hemiptera
- Suborder: Auchenorrhyncha
- Family: Cicadidae
- Genus: Heremusina
- Species: H. udeoecetes

Binomial name
- Heremusina udeoecetes Ewart, 2018

Species of cicada

Heremusina udeoecetes is a species of cicada, also known as the Alice Springs watch-winder, in the true cicada family, Cicadettinae subfamily and Cicadettini tribe. It is endemic to Australia. It was described in 2018 by Australian entomologist Anthony Ewart.

== Description ==
The length of the forewing is 11–12 mm.

== Distribution and habitat ==
The species occurs in the vicinity of the town of Alice Springs in the Northern Territory. Its associated habitat is arid grassland.

== Behaviour ==
Adults have been observed in December, clinging to grass stems, uttering rapid, repetitive, creaking calls.
