= Pauropsalta confinis =

Scientific classification
- Kingdom: Animalia
- Phylum: Arthropoda
- Clade: Pancrustacea
- Class: Insecta
- Order: Hemiptera
- Suborder: Auchenorrhyncha
- Family: Cicadidae
- Genus: Pauropsalta
- Species: P. confinis

Binomial name
- Pauropsalta confinis Owen & Moulds, 2016

Species of cicada

Pauropsalta confinis is a species of cicada, also known as the seismic squawker, in the true cicada family, Cicadettinae subfamily and Cicadettini tribe. It is endemic to Australia. It was described in 2016 by entomologists Christopher Owen and Maxwell Sydney Moulds.

== Etymology ==
The specific epithet confinis (Latin: ‘neighbouring’ or ‘adjoining’) refers to the positioning of the forewing veins.

== Description ==
The length of the forewing is 19–23 mm.

== Distribution and habitat ==
The species occurs in inland Western Australia, Lake Gilles in South Australia,and in the Tarawi and Nombinnie Nature Reserves in central New South Wales. The associated habitat is mallee eucalypt woodland.

== Behaviour ==
Adult males may be heard from late November to early March, clinging to the branches of mallee eucalypts, emitting persistent pulsing and buzzing songs.
