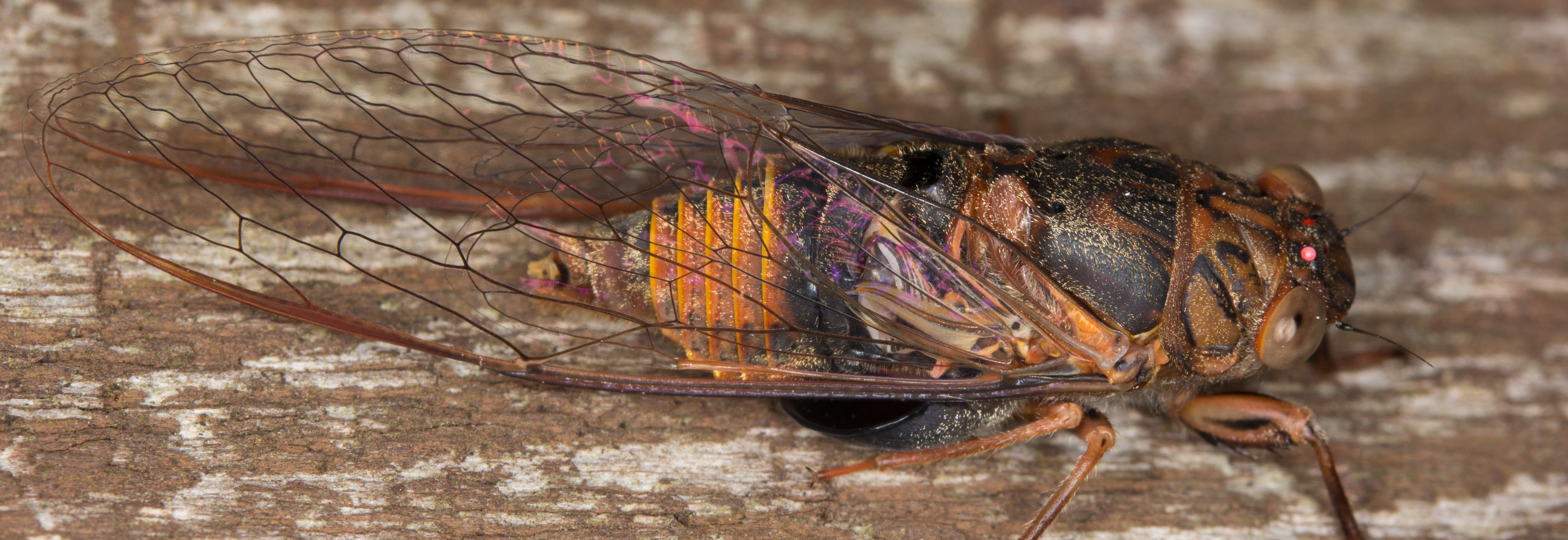
- Birrima varians

Scientific classification
- Kingdom: Animalia
- Phylum: Arthropoda
- Clade: Pancrustacea
- Class: Insecta
- Order: Hemiptera
- Suborder: Auchenorrhyncha
- Infraorder: Cicadomorpha
- Superfamily: Cicadoidea
- Family: Cicadidae
- Subfamily: Cicadettinae
- Genus: Birrima; Distant, 1906

= Birrima =

Genus of cicadas

Birrima is a genus of cicadas, also known as tree-tickers, in the family Cicadidae, subfamily Cicadettinae and tribe Cicadettini. It is endemic to Australia. It was described in 1906 by English entomologist William Lucas Distant.

== Species ==
As of 2025 there were two described species in the genus:

- Birrima castanea (Goding & Froggatt, 1904) (Red Tree-ticker)
- Birrima varians (Germar, 1834) (Black Tree-ticker)
