= Pauropsalta agasta =

Scientific classification
- Kingdom: Animalia
- Phylum: Arthropoda
- Clade: Pancrustacea
- Class: Insecta
- Order: Hemiptera
- Suborder: Auchenorrhyncha
- Family: Cicadidae
- Genus: Pauropsalta
- Species: P. agasta

Binomial name
- Pauropsalta agasta Owen & Moulds, 2016

Species of cicada

Pauropsalta agasta is a species of cicada, also known as the Kimberley frog squawker, in the true cicada family, Cicadettinae subfamily and Cicadettini tribe. It is endemic to Australia. It was described in 2016 by entomologists Christopher Owen and Maxwell Sydney Moulds.

== Etymology ==
The specific epithet agasta (Greek: ‘twin’ or ‘close kinsman’) refers to the close relationship between this species and Pauropsalta adelphe.

== Description ==
The length of the forewing is 27–31 mm.

== Distribution and habitat ==
The species occurs in the Kimberley region of northern Western Australia, including adjacent areas along the border with the Northern Territory. The associated habitat is tropical eucalypt woodland.

== Behaviour ==
Adult males may be heard from October to January, clinging to the trunks of eucalypts and other trees, emitting deep, frog-like, croaking songs.
