= Xeropsalta thomsoni =

Scientific classification
- Kingdom: Animalia
- Phylum: Arthropoda
- Clade: Pancrustacea
- Class: Insecta
- Order: Hemiptera
- Suborder: Auchenorrhyncha
- Family: Cicadidae
- Genus: Xeropsalta
- Species: X. thomsoni

Binomial name
- Xeropsalta thomsoni Ewart, 2018

Species of cicada

Xeropsalta thomsoni is a species of cicada, also known as the Thomson River grass-shaker or Birdsville grass-shaker, in the true cicada family, Cicadettinae subfamily and Cicadettini tribe. The species is endemic to Australia. It was described in 2018 by Australian entomologist Anthony Ewart.

== Description ==
The length of the forewing is 11–13 mm.

== Distribution and habitat ==
The species occurs in the Lake Eyre basin of Central Australia; it is known from the floodplain of the Thomson River south-west of Longreach and the Diamantina River at Birdsville in south-west Queensland, extending southwards to the Bulloo Overflow in New South Wales, and westwards to the Cooper Creek drainage system east of Lake Eyre in South Australia. Associated habitats include alluvial grasslands and open floodplains with lignum.

== Behaviour ==
Adult males may be heard in January and February, clinging to the stems of grasses, lignum and forbs, emitting simple maraca-like calls.
