= Myopsalta albiventris =

Scientific classification
- Kingdom: Animalia
- Phylum: Arthropoda
- Clade: Pancrustacea
- Class: Insecta
- Order: Hemiptera
- Suborder: Auchenorrhyncha
- Family: Cicadidae
- Genus: Myopsalta
- Species: M. albiventris

Binomial name
- Myopsalta albiventris Popple, 2017

Species of cicada

Myopsalta albiventris is a species of cicada, also known as the pale-bellied buzzer, in the true cicada family, Cicadettinae subfamily and Cicadettini tribe. It is endemic to Australia. It was described in 2017 by Australian entomologist Lindsay Popple.

== Etymology ==
The specific epithet albiventris is derived from Latin albus (white) and venter (belly), referring to the cicadas’ pale sternites.

== Description ==
The length of the forewing is 16–17 mm.

== Distribution and habitat ==
The species occurs in southern Queensland, from Clermont south and east to Mount Moffatt, Biggenden, Mount Lindesay and Kyogle, with an isolated population near Singleton in central New South Wales. The holotype specimen was collected in the Expedition Range National Park. Associated habitats include grassland with scattered trees and grassy woodland.

== Behaviour ==
Adult males may be heard from September to February, after rain, clinging to grass stems, uttering rapid, high-pitched, chirping calls.
