= Pauropsalta contigua =

Scientific classification
- Kingdom: Animalia
- Phylum: Arthropoda
- Clade: Pancrustacea
- Class: Insecta
- Order: Hemiptera
- Suborder: Auchenorrhyncha
- Family: Cicadidae
- Genus: Pauropsalta
- Species: P. contigua

Binomial name
- Pauropsalta contigua Owen & Moulds, 2016

Species of cicada

Pauropsalta contigua is a species of cicada, also known as the oven squawker, in the true cicada family, Cicadettinae subfamily and Cicadettini tribe. It is endemic to Australia. It was described in 2016 by entomologists Christopher Owen and Maxwell Sydney Moulds.

== Etymology ==
The specific epithet contigua (Latin: ‘neighbouring’) is an anatomical reference to the non-fusion of forewing vein stems.

== Description ==
The length of the forewing is 16–21 mm.

== Distribution and habitat ==
The species occurs in southern Western Australia from Cue south-eastwards to the state border, as well as at scattered locations in South Australia. The associated habitat is mallee eucalypt woodland.

== Behaviour ==
Adult males may be heard from December to March, clinging to the trunks and branches of mallee eucalypts, emitting chirping and buzzing songs.
