= Myopsalta melanobasis =

Scientific classification
- Kingdom: Animalia
- Phylum: Arthropoda
- Clade: Pancrustacea
- Class: Insecta
- Order: Hemiptera
- Suborder: Auchenorrhyncha
- Family: Cicadidae
- Genus: Myopsalta
- Species: M. melanobasis

Binomial name
- Myopsalta melanobasis Popple, 2017

Species of cicada

Myopsalta melanobasis is a species of cicada, also known as the broad-winged buzzer, in the true cicada family, Cicadettinae subfamily and Cicadettini tribe. It is endemic to Australia. It was described in 2017 by Australian entomologist Lindsay Popple.

== Etymology ==
The specific epithet melanobasis is derived from Greek melanos (dark) and basis (base), with reference to the opaque, dark brown base of the clavus.

== Description ==
The length of the forewing is 15–18 mm.

== Distribution and habitat ==
The species occurs throughout the Brigalow Belt of inland Queensland. The associated habitat is brigalow woodland and shrubland.

== Behaviour ==
Adult males may be heard in December, clinging high on the branches of trees and shrubs, uttering continuous, stuttering calls.
