= Myopsalta waterhousei =

Scientific classification
- Kingdom: Animalia
- Phylum: Arthropoda
- Clade: Pancrustacea
- Class: Insecta
- Order: Hemiptera
- Suborder: Auchenorrhyncha
- Family: Cicadidae
- Genus: Myopsalta
- Species: M. waterhousei

Binomial name
- Myopsalta waterhousei (Distant, 1905)

Synonyms
- Melampsalta waterhousei Distant, 1905; Melampsalta kewelensis Distant, 1907

Species of cicada

Myopsalta waterhousei is a species of cicada, also known as a smoky buzzer, in the true cicada family, Cicadettinae subfamily and Cicadettini tribe. It is endemic to Australia. It was described in 1905 by English entomologist William Lucas Distant.

== Description ==
The length of the forewing is 14–19 mm.

== Distribution and habitat ==
The species occurs from Warwick in south-eastern Queensland through the Tamworth district in New South Wales and the Australian Capital Territory to Victoria, as well as in the Adelaide region of South Australia. The associated habitat is open grassland.

== Behaviour ==
Adult males may be heard from September to March, clinging to grass stems, uttering metallic, buzzing calls.
