= Myopsalta coolahensis =

Scientific classification
- Kingdom: Animalia
- Phylum: Arthropoda
- Clade: Pancrustacea
- Class: Insecta
- Order: Hemiptera
- Suborder: Auchenorrhyncha
- Family: Cicadidae
- Genus: Myopsalta
- Species: M. coolahensis

Binomial name
- Myopsalta coolahensis Emery, Emery & Popple, 2015

Species of cicada

Myopsalta coolahensis is a species of cicada, also known as the Coolah grass buzzer, in the true cicada family, Cicadettinae subfamily and Cicadettini tribe. It is endemic to Australia. It was described in 2015 by Australian entomologists Nathan J. Emery, David L. Emery and Lindsay Popple.

== Etymology ==
The specific epithet coolahensis refers to the type locality.

== Description ==
The length of the forewing is 14–17 mm.

== Distribution and habitat ==
The species is known only from riparian parts of the Coolah district of central western New South Wales. The associated habitat is grassland on alluvial soils.

== Behaviour ==
Adult males may be heard from November to February, uttering fluttery, buzzing calls.
