= Myopsalta lactea =

Scientific classification
- Kingdom: Animalia
- Phylum: Arthropoda
- Clade: Pancrustacea
- Class: Insecta
- Order: Hemiptera
- Suborder: Auchenorrhyncha
- Family: Cicadidae
- Genus: Myopsalta
- Species: M. lactea

Binomial name
- Myopsalta lactea (Distant, 1905)

Synonyms
- Melampsalta lactea Distant, 1905; Cicadetta lactea (Distant, 1905)

Species of cicada

Myopsalta lactea is a species of cicada, also known as the dark smoky buzzer, in the true cicada family, Cicadettinae subfamily and Cicadettini tribe. It is endemic to Australia. It was described in 1905 by English entomologist William Lucas Distant.

== Description ==
The length of the forewing is 15–17 mm.

== Distribution and habitat ==
The species is known only from the type locality of Melbourne in Victoria. The associated habitat is grassland.

== Behaviour ==
Adult males may be heard in late spring and early summer.
