= Myopsalta parvula =

Scientific classification
- Kingdom: Animalia
- Phylum: Arthropoda
- Clade: Pancrustacea
- Class: Insecta
- Order: Hemiptera
- Suborder: Auchenorrhyncha
- Family: Cicadidae
- Genus: Myopsalta
- Species: M. parvula

Binomial name
- Myopsalta parvula Popple, 2017

Species of cicada

Myopsalta parvula is a species of cicada, also known as the Black Mountain tinkler, in the true cicada family, Cicadettinae subfamily and Cicadettini tribe. It is endemic to Australia. It was described in 2017 by Australian entomologist Lindsay Popple.

== Etymology ==
The specific epithet parvula is derived from Latin parvulus (small), with reference to the relative size of the cicadas.

== Description ==
The length of the forewing is 14–15 mm.

== Distribution and habitat ==
The species is only known from the foothills of Black Mountain in the Australian Capital Territory, and from near Omeo in north-eastern Victoria. The associated habitat is grassy woodland with a moderate slope.

== Behaviour ==
Adult males may be heard in November, clinging to grass stems, uttering soft, high-pitched, tinkling calls.
