= Mugadina superba =

Scientific classification
- Kingdom: Animalia
- Phylum: Arthropoda
- Clade: Pancrustacea
- Class: Insecta
- Order: Hemiptera
- Suborder: Auchenorrhyncha
- Family: Cicadidae
- Genus: Mugadina
- Species: M. superba

Binomial name
- Mugadina superba Ewart & Moulds, 2021

Species of cicada

Mugadina superba is a species of cicada, also known as the superb grass-ticker, in the true cicada family, Cicadettinae subfamily and Cicadettini tribe. It is endemic to Australia. It was described in 2021 by Australian entomologists Anthony Ewart and Maxwell Sydney Moulds.

== Description ==
The length of the forewing is 16–20 mm.

== Distribution and habitat ==
The species occurs in inland Queensland, largely in the Mitchell Grass Downs bioregion. Its associated habitat is open grassland.

== Behaviour ==
Adult males may be heard from November to May, clinging to grass stems, uttering loud ticking calls.
