= Myopsalta bassiana =

Scientific classification
- Kingdom: Animalia
- Phylum: Arthropoda
- Clade: Pancrustacea
- Class: Insecta
- Order: Hemiptera
- Suborder: Auchenorrhyncha
- Family: Cicadidae
- Genus: Myopsalta
- Species: M. bassiana

Binomial name
- Myopsalta bassiana Popple, 2017

Species of cicada

Myopsalta bassiana is a species of cicada, also known as the Bassian buzzer, in the true cicada family, Cicadettinae subfamily and Cicadettini tribe. It is endemic to Australia. It was described in 2017 by Australian entomologist Lindsay Popple.

== Etymology ==
The specific epithet bassiana refers to the temperate or Bassian distribution of the cicadas in south-eastern Australia.

== Description ==
The length of the forewing is 16–18 mm.

== Distribution and habitat ==
The species occurs as scattered populations extending southwards from the Gibraltar Range in north-eastern New South Wales, through the Australian Capital Territory, to the vicinity of Omeo in north-eastern Victoria. Associated habitats include open forests and woodlands with grassy or shrubby understoreys.

== Behaviour ==
Adult males may be heard from October to January, clinging to the trunks of eucalypts, uttering buzzing and ticking calls.
