= Myopsalta septa =

Scientific classification
- Kingdom: Animalia
- Phylum: Arthropoda
- Clade: Pancrustacea
- Class: Insecta
- Order: Hemiptera
- Suborder: Auchenorrhyncha
- Family: Cicadidae
- Genus: Myopsalta
- Species: M. septa

Binomial name
- Myopsalta septa Popple, 2017

Species of cicada

Myopsalta septa is a species of cicada, also known as the Warwick grass buzzer, in the true cicada family, Cicadettinae subfamily and Cicadettini tribe. It is endemic to Australia. It was described in 2017 by Australian entomologist Lindsay Popple.

== Etymology ==
The specific epithet septa (Latin: ‘paddock’) refers to the species’ habitat, in that most specimens have been collected in paddocks in agricultural areas.

== Description ==
The length of the forewing is 16–18 mm.

== Distribution and habitat ==
The species occurs in inland south-east Queensland, including Warwick in the Southern Downs Region, with the range extending southwards to Delungra in northern New South Wales. The associated habitat is grassland and other vegetation in open fields.

== Behaviour ==
Adult males may be heard in October and November, clinging to grass stems, shrubs and fence-posts, uttering repetitive buzzing calls.
