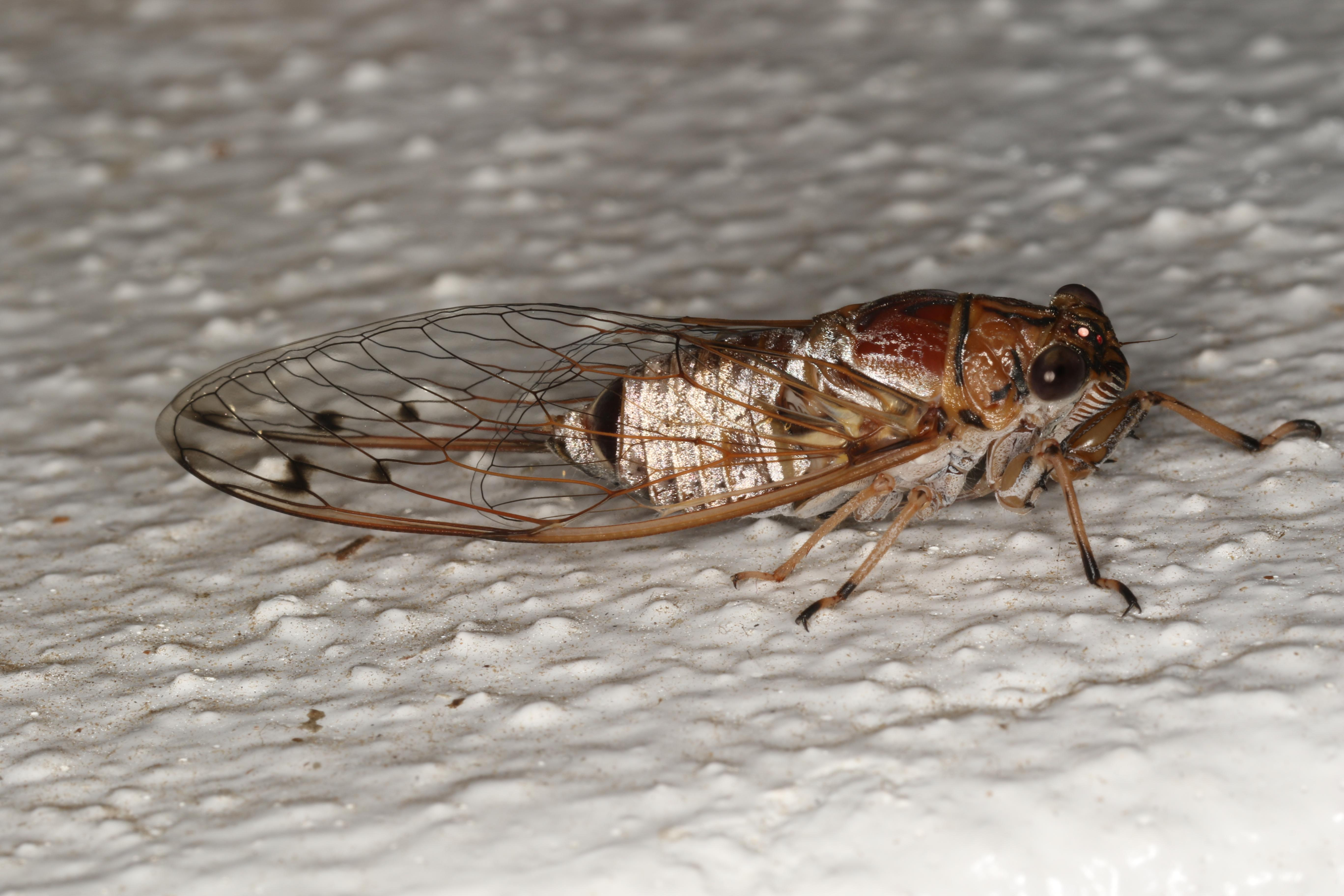
- Tamasa tristigma

Scientific classification
- Kingdom: Animalia
- Phylum: Arthropoda
- Clade: Pancrustacea
- Class: Insecta
- Order: Hemiptera
- Suborder: Auchenorrhyncha
- Infraorder: Cicadomorpha
- Superfamily: Cicadoidea
- Family: Cicadidae
- Genus: Tamasa; Distant, 1905

= Tamasa =

Genus of cicadas

Tamasa is a genus of cicadas, commonly known as bunyips, in the family Cicadidae and tribe Tamasini, that is found along much of the eastern coast of Australia, from the Cape York Peninsula of Far North Queensland southwards to Ulladulla on the south coast of New South Wales. It was described in 1905 by English entomologist William Lucas Distant.

== Species ==
As of 2025 there were five described species in the genus:

- Tamasa burgessi (Distant, 1905) (Cairns Bunyip, Two-toned Bunyip)
- Tamasa caverna Moulds and Olive, 2014 (Boulder Bunyip)
- Tamasa doddi (Goding and Froggatt, 1904) (Dodd's Bunyip)
- Tamasa rainbowi Ashton, 1912 (Green Bunyip)
- Tamasa tristigma (Germar, 1834) (Brown Bunyip, Eastern Bunyip)
