= Auscala flammea =

Scientific classification
- Kingdom: Animalia
- Phylum: Arthropoda
- Clade: Pancrustacea
- Class: Insecta
- Order: Hemiptera
- Suborder: Auchenorrhyncha
- Family: Cicadidae
- Genus: Auscala
- Species: A. flammea

Binomial name
- Auscala flammea Emery, Emery & Hutchinson, 2020

Species of cicada

Auscala flammea is a species of cicada, also known as the red mallee creaker, in the true cicada family, Cicadettinae subfamily and Cicadettini tribe. It is endemic to Australia. It was described in 2020 by entomologists D.L Emery, N.J. Emery and Paul Hutchinson.

== Description ==
The length of the forewing is 27–36 mm.

== Distribution and habitat ==
The species is found in south-west Western Australia and in southern South Australia from the northern Eyre Peninsula eastwards, with its range extending to extreme south-western New South Wales and north-western Victoria. The associated habitat is mallee woodland.

== Behaviour ==
The songs of the male cicadas have been likened to the sounds made by a creaking tree branch.
