= Platypsalta =

Scientific classification
- Kingdom: Animalia
- Phylum: Arthropoda
- Clade: Pancrustacea
- Class: Insecta
- Order: Hemiptera
- Suborder: Auchenorrhyncha
- Infraorder: Cicadomorpha
- Superfamily: Cicadoidea
- Family: Cicadidae
- Subfamily: Cicadettinae
- Genus: Platypsalta; Moulds, 2012

Genus of cicadas

Platypsalta is a genus of cicadas, also known as scrub-buzzers, in the family Cicadidae, subfamily Cicadettinae and tribe Cicadettini. It is endemic to Australia. It was described in 2012 by Australian entomologist Maxwell Sydney Moulds.

== Etymology ==
The genus name Platypsalta is a combination derived from Greek platys (‘broad’ or ‘flat’) with reference to the cicadas’ broad forewings, with psalta (from Latin psaltria – a female harpist) which is traditionally used as a suffix on many genus names of cicadas .

== Species ==
As of 2025 there were two described species in the genus:

- Platypsalta dubia (Goding & Froggatt, 1904) (Black Scrub-buzzer)
- Platypsalta mixta (Distant, 1914) (Black Scrub-buzzer)
