= Pauropsalta opaca =

Scientific classification
- Kingdom: Animalia
- Phylum: Arthropoda
- Clade: Pancrustacea
- Class: Insecta
- Order: Hemiptera
- Suborder: Auchenorrhyncha
- Family: Cicadidae
- Genus: Pauropsalta
- Species: P. opaca

Binomial name
- Pauropsalta opaca Ewart, 1989

Species of cicada

Pauropsalta opaca is a species of cicada, also known as the fairy dust squawker, in the true cicada family, Cicadettinae subfamily and Cicadettini tribe. It is endemic to Australia. It was described in 1989 by Australian entomologist Anthony Ewart.

== Etymology ==
The specific epithet opaca (Latin: ‘shady’ or ‘dim’) refers to the dull appearance of the cicadas.

== Description ==
The length of the forewing is 23–29 mm.

== Distribution and habitat ==
The species occurs in the dryer parts of the Wet Tropics of Queensland, from Mount Carbine southwards to Undara, with an isolated record from the Paluma Range. The associated habitat is eucalypt woodland.

== Behaviour ==
Adult males may be heard from October to March, clinging to the trunks and upper branches of eucalypts, emitting complex buzzing and chirping calls.
