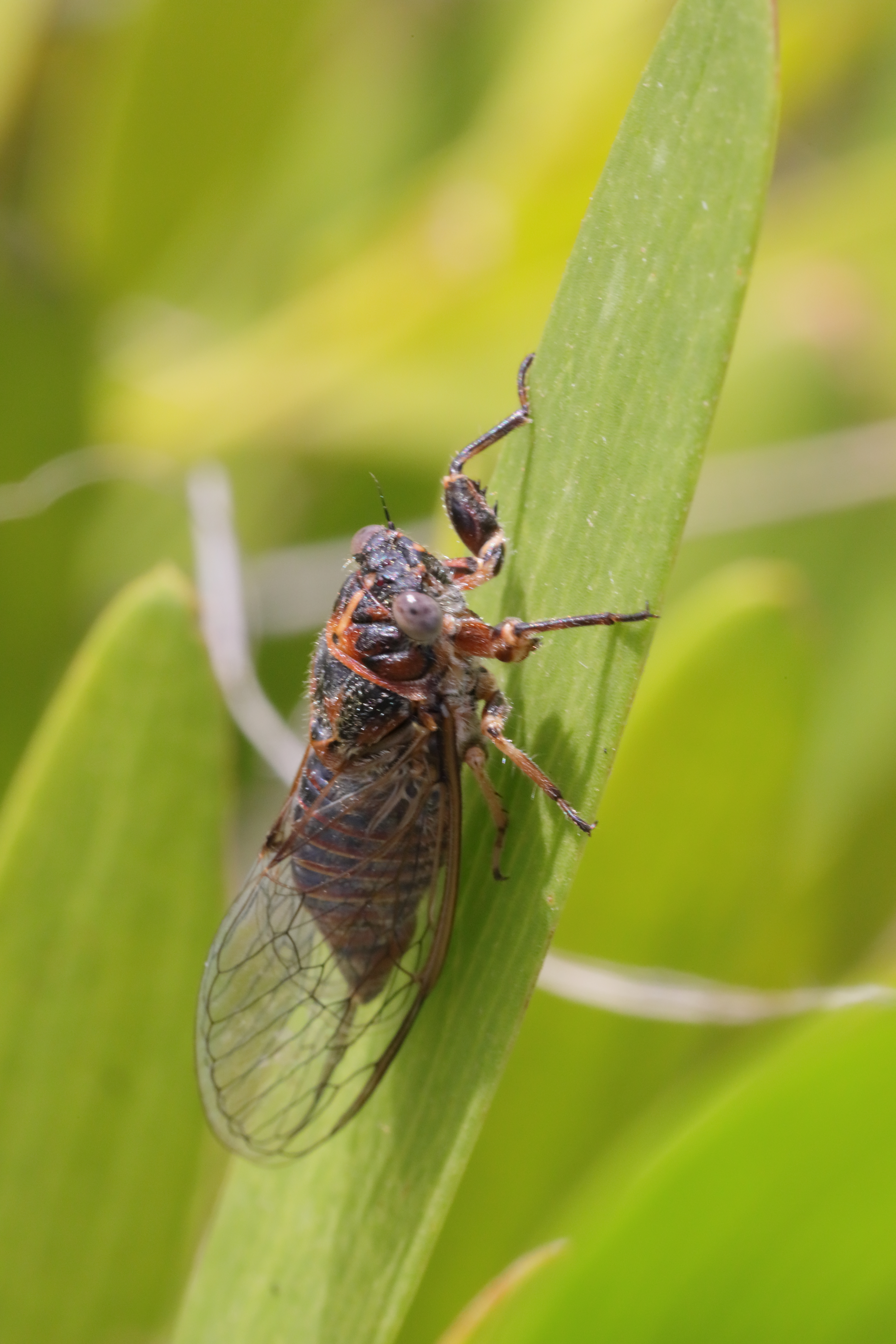
- Haemopsalta aktites

Scientific classification
- Kingdom: Animalia
- Phylum: Arthropoda
- Clade: Pancrustacea
- Class: Insecta
- Order: Hemiptera
- Suborder: Auchenorrhyncha
- Infraorder: Cicadomorpha
- Superfamily: Cicadoidea
- Family: Cicadidae
- Subfamily: Cicadettinae
- Genus: Haemopsalta; Owen & Moulds, 2016

= Haemopsalta =

Genus of cicadas

Haemopsalta is a genus of cicadas, also known as red squeakers, in the family Cicadidae, subfamily Cicadettinae and tribe Cicadettini. It is endemic to Australia. It was described in 2016 by entomologists Christopher Owen and Maxwell Sydney Moulds.

== Etymology ==
The genus name Haemopsalta is a combination derived from Greek root haemo- (‘blood’), with reference to the red colouration exhibited by most species, and psalta, a traditional suffix used in the generic names of many cicadas.

== Species ==
As of 2025 there were five described species in the genus:

- Haemopsalta aktites (Ewart, 1989) (Beach Squeaker)
- Haemopsalta eximia Emery & Emery, 2021 (Dharug Squeaker)
- Haemopsalta flammeata Owen & Moulds, 2016 (Sunray Squeaker)
- Haemopsalta georgina Owen & Moulds, 2016 (Tasmanian Squeaker)
- Haemopsalta rubea (Goding & Froggatt, 1904) (Red Squeaker)
