= Myopsalta riverina =

Scientific classification
- Kingdom: Animalia
- Phylum: Arthropoda
- Clade: Pancrustacea
- Class: Insecta
- Order: Hemiptera
- Suborder: Auchenorrhyncha
- Family: Cicadidae
- Genus: Myopsalta
- Species: M. riverina

Binomial name
- Myopsalta riverina Popple, 2017

Species of cicada

Myopsalta riverina is a species of cicada, also known as the eastern mallee buzzer, in the true cicada family, Cicadettinae subfamily and Cicadettini tribe. It is endemic to Australia. It was described in 2017 by Australian entomologist Lindsay Popple.

== Etymology ==
The specific epithet riverina refers to the Riverina region of south-western New South Wales where the species was discovered.

== Description ==
The length of the forewing is 15–16 mm.

== Distribution and habitat ==
The species is only known from isolated sites in New South Wales and southern South Australia. The type locality is 33 km south-south-west of Rankins Springs in the Riverina. The associated habitat is mallee woodland.

== Behaviour ==
Adult males may be heard from October to February, clinging to the upper branches of mallee eucalypts, uttering high-pitched buzzing calls, interspersed with soft ticking, in sunshine.
