= Xeropsalta =

Scientific classification
- Kingdom: Animalia
- Phylum: Arthropoda
- Clade: Pancrustacea
- Class: Insecta
- Order: Hemiptera
- Suborder: Auchenorrhyncha
- Infraorder: Cicadomorpha
- Superfamily: Cicadoidea
- Family: Cicadidae
- Subfamily: Cicadettinae
- Genus: Xeropsalta; Ewart, 2018

Genus of cicadas

Xeropsalta is a genus of cicadas, also known as grass-shakers, in the family Cicadidae, subfamily Cicadettinae and tribe Cicadettini. It is endemic to Australia. It was described in 2018 by Australian entomologist Anthony Ewart.

== Species ==
As of 2025 there were five described species in the genus:

- Xeropsalta aridula Ewart, 2018 (Simpson Desert Grass-shaker)
- Xeropsalta eremica Moulds & Marshall, 2025 (Nullarbor green)
- Xeropsalta festiva (Distant, 1907) (Bee Gleeper)
- Xeropsalta rattrayi Ewart, 2018 (Green Grass-shaker)
- Xeropsalta thomsoni Ewart, 2018 (Birdsville Grass-shaker)
