= Tamasa rainbowi =

Scientific classification
- Kingdom: Animalia
- Phylum: Arthropoda
- Clade: Pancrustacea
- Class: Insecta
- Order: Hemiptera
- Suborder: Auchenorrhyncha
- Family: Cicadidae
- Genus: Tamasa
- Species: T. rainbowi

Binomial name
- Tamasa rainbowi Ashton, 1912

Species of cicada

Tamasa rainbowi, also known as the green bunyip, is a species of cicada in the true cicada family. It is endemic to Australia. It was described in 1912 by Australian entomologist Julian Howard Ashton.

== Description ==
The length of the forewing is 37–40 mm.

== Distribution and habitat ==
The species occurs in a restricted area around south-eastern Queensland and north-eastern New South Wales, from Tamborine Mountain to Dorrigo. The associated habitat is a transition zone, at an elevation of between 500 and 1,200 m, between subtropical and warm temperate rainforest.

== Behaviour ==
Adults are heard from November to March, clinging to the trunks and main branches of rainforest trees, uttering powerful, metallic buzzing calls.
