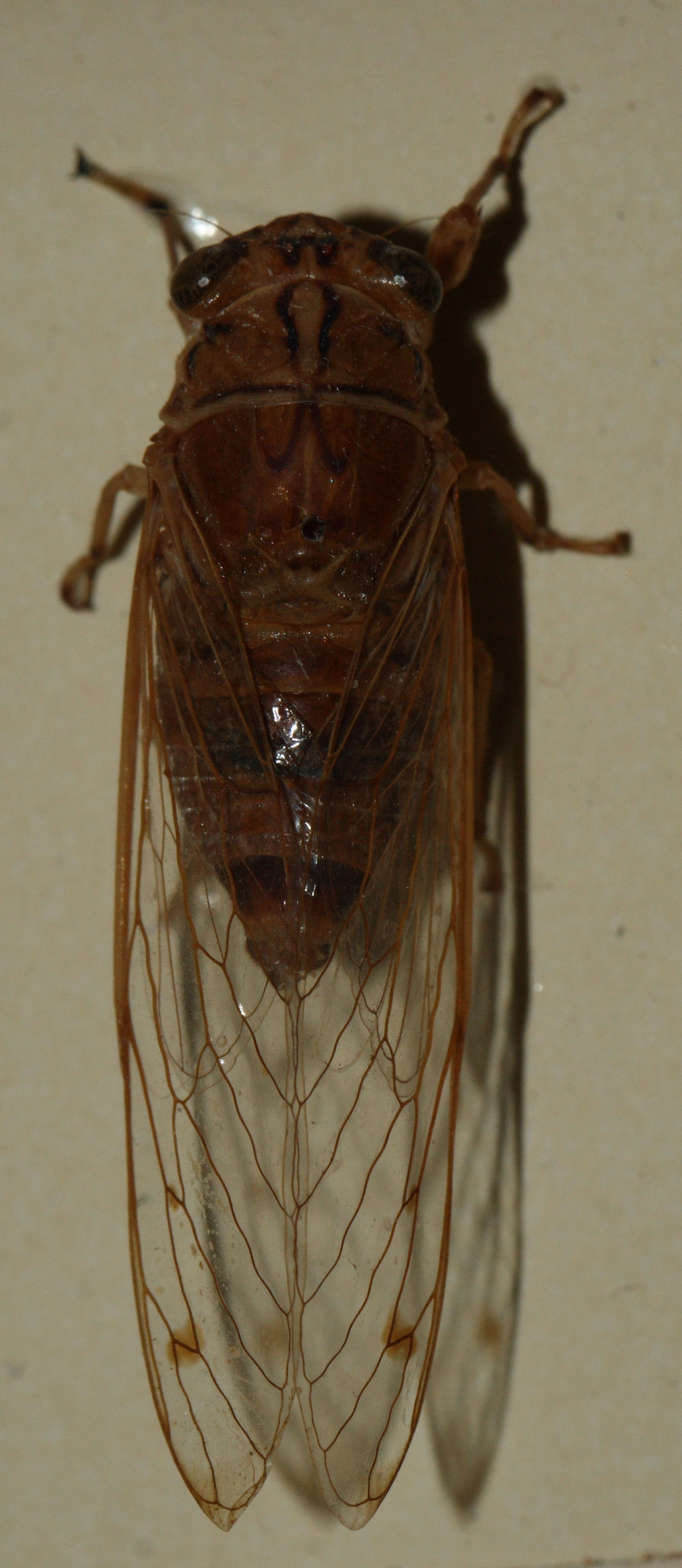

Scientific classification
- Kingdom: Animalia
- Phylum: Arthropoda
- Clade: Pancrustacea
- Class: Insecta
- Order: Hemiptera
- Suborder: Auchenorrhyncha
- Family: Cicadidae
- Genus: Tamasa
- Species: T. tristigma

Binomial name
- Tamasa tristigma (Germar, 1834)

Synonyms
- Cicada tristigma Germar, 1834; Tibicen kurandae Goding & Froggatt, 1904

= Tamasa tristigma =

Species of cicada

Tamasa tristigma, also known as the brown bunyip or eastern bunyip, is a species or species complex of cicadas in the true cicada family. It is endemic to Australia. It was described in 1834 by German entomologist Ernst Friedrich Germar.

Common names given to the various forms include: small brown bunyip, blue-green bunyip, heathlands bunyip, Eungella bunyip, Atherton bunyip, Paluma bunyip and Whitsunday bunyip.

== Description ==
The length of the forewing is 22–36 mm. Colours within the species complex vary from rich brown through grey-brown to green and blue-green.

== Distribution and habitat ==
The species occurs in eastern coastal Australia from the Cape York Peninsula in Far North Queensland to Ulladulla on the south coast of New South Wales, as well as inland at the Blackdown Tableland, Monto and Carnarvon Gorge. The associated habitat comprises rainforests and vine thickets, open forest, heathland and mangroves. Favoured trees include Casuarina glauca, Allocasuarina torulosa and Acacia prominens.

== Behaviour ==
Adults are heard from September to June, clinging to the trunks and main branches of trees, uttering coarse, monotonous buzzing and rattling calls, covering a wide range of frequencies.
