= Myopsalta libritor =

Scientific classification
- Kingdom: Animalia
- Phylum: Arthropoda
- Clade: Pancrustacea
- Class: Insecta
- Order: Hemiptera
- Suborder: Auchenorrhyncha
- Family: Cicadidae
- Genus: Myopsalta
- Species: M. libritor

Binomial name
- Myopsalta libritor Emery, Emery & Popple, 2015

Species of cicada

Myopsalta libritor is a species of cicada, also known as the Coolah repeater, in the true cicada family, Cicadettinae subfamily and Cicadettini tribe. It is endemic to Australia. It was described in 2015 by Australian entomologists Nathan J. Emery, David L. Emery and Lindsay Popple.

== Etymology ==
The specific epithet libritor (Latin: ‘hurler’, ‘thrower’ or ‘gunner’) refers to the machine gun-like sound of the song.

== Description ==
The length of the forewing is 12–17 mm.

== Distribution and habitat ==
The species is known only from riparian parts of the Coolah and Merriwa districts of inland New South Wales. The associated habitat is grassland on alluvial soils.

== Behaviour ==
Adult males may be heard from October to January, uttering rapid, chirping calls.
