= Mugadina marshalli =

Scientific classification
- Kingdom: Animalia
- Phylum: Arthropoda
- Clade: Pancrustacea
- Class: Insecta
- Order: Hemiptera
- Suborder: Auchenorrhyncha
- Family: Cicadidae
- Genus: Mugadina
- Species: M. marshalli

Binomial name
- Mugadina marshalli (Distant, 1911)

Synonyms
- Urabunana marshalli Distant, 1911

Species of cicada

Mugadina marshalli is a species of cicada, also known as the yellow grass-ticker, in the true cicada family, Cicadettinae subfamily and Cicadettini tribe. It is endemic to Australia. It was described in 1911 by English entomologist William Lucas Distant.

== Description ==
The length of the forewing is 12–15 mm.

== Distribution and habitat ==
The species occurs in inland central eastern Australia in an area bounded in the north by Glenden and Mitchell in Queensland and by Nyngan and Singleton in New South Wales, with an isolated population in central western Victoria. Its associated habitat is open grassland.

== Behaviour ==
Adult males may be heard from September to April after rain, clinging to grass stems, uttering rapid ticking calls.
