= Pauropsalta melanopygia =

Scientific classification
- Kingdom: Animalia
- Phylum: Arthropoda
- Clade: Pancrustacea
- Class: Insecta
- Order: Hemiptera
- Suborder: Auchenorrhyncha
- Family: Cicadidae
- Genus: Pauropsalta
- Species: P. melanopygia

Binomial name
- Pauropsalta melanopygia (Germar, 1834)

Synonyms
- Cicada melanopygia Germar, 1834

Species of cicada

Pauropsalta melanopygia is a species of cicada, also known as the strident squawker, in the true cicada family, Cicadettinae subfamily and Cicadettini tribe. It is endemic to Australia. It was described in 1834 by German entomologist Ernst Friedrich Germar.

== Description ==
The length of the forewing is 18–24 mm.

== Distribution and habitat ==
The species occurs in the Top End of the Northern Territory and the eastern Kimberley region of Western Australia. The lectotype specimen was collected on Melville Island. The associated habitat is tropical open eucalypt woodland.

== Behaviour ==
Adult males may be heard from November to February, clinging to the trunks of eucalypts, emitting slow, rattling and buzzing calls.
