= Pauropsalta conflua =

Scientific classification
- Kingdom: Animalia
- Phylum: Arthropoda
- Clade: Pancrustacea
- Class: Insecta
- Order: Hemiptera
- Suborder: Auchenorrhyncha
- Family: Cicadidae
- Genus: Pauropsalta
- Species: P. conflua

Binomial name
- Pauropsalta conflua Owen & Moulds, 2016

Species of cicada

Pauropsalta conflua is a species of cicada, also known as the small mallee squawker, in the true cicada family, Cicadettinae subfamily and Cicadettini tribe. It is endemic to Australia. It was described in 2016 by entomologists Christopher Owen and Maxwell Sydney Moulds.

== Etymology ==
The specific epithet conflua (Latin: ‘flowing together’ or ‘uniting’) is an anatomical reference to the fusion of forewing vein stems.

== Description ==
The length of the forewing is 14–22 mm.

== Distribution and habitat ==
The species occurs in southern Western Australia from Ravensthorpe eastwards to Cape Arid National Park and north to Kalgoorlie, with an isolated population at Madura, as well as in South Australia from the lower Murray region northwards to Port Augusta, and on the Eyre Peninsula. The associated habitat is mallee eucalypt woodland.

== Behaviour ==
Adult males may be heard from December to February, clinging to the branches of mallee eucalypts, emitting strident chirping and buzzing songs.
