= Pauropsalta accola =

Scientific classification
- Kingdom: Animalia
- Phylum: Arthropoda
- Clade: Pancrustacea
- Class: Insecta
- Order: Hemiptera
- Suborder: Auchenorrhyncha
- Family: Cicadidae
- Genus: Pauropsalta
- Species: P. accola

Binomial name
- Pauropsalta accola Owen & Moulds, 2016

Species of cicada

Pauropsalta accola is a species of cicada, also known as the lively squawker or subcoastal squawker, in the true cicada family, Cicadettinae subfamily and Cicadettini tribe. It is endemic to Australia. It was described in 2016 by entomologists Christopher Owen and Maxwell Sydney Moulds.

== Etymology ==
The specific epithet accola (Latin: ‘neighbour’) refers to the positioning of vein stems in forewing anatomy.

== Description ==
The length of the forewing is 19–23 mm.

== Distribution and habitat ==
The species occurs along the subcoastal southern margin of Western Australia, from Lake King eastwards to Moodini Bluff, as well as in south-eastern South Australia from Sherlock to Port Broughton. The associated habitat is mallee eucalypt woodland.

== Behaviour ==
Adult males may be heard from November to February, clinging to the branches of mallee eucalypts, emitting rattling and buzzing songs.
