= Pauropsalta elgneri =

Scientific classification
- Kingdom: Animalia
- Phylum: Arthropoda
- Clade: Pancrustacea
- Class: Insecta
- Order: Hemiptera
- Suborder: Auchenorrhyncha
- Family: Cicadidae
- Genus: Pauropsalta
- Species: P. elgneri

Binomial name
- Pauropsalta elgneri Ashton, 1912

Species of cicada

Pauropsalta elgneri is a species of cicada, also known as the paperbark tree-clicker, in the true cicada family, Cicadettinae subfamily and Cicadettini tribe. It is endemic to Australia. It was described in 1912 by Australian entomologist Julian Howard Ashton.

== Description ==
The length of the forewing is 18–24 mm.

== Distribution and habitat ==
The species occurs on the Cape York Peninsula of Far North Queensland, from the tip of the peninsula southwards to the Archer River, and also from Cape Flattery north of Cooktown. Associated habitats include low-lying swampy areas and grassy woodland with paperbark trees.

== Behaviour ==
Adult males may be heard from November to February, clinging to tree trunks, emitting rapid double-clicking calls.
