= Haemopsalta georgina =

Scientific classification
- Kingdom: Animalia
- Phylum: Arthropoda
- Clade: Pancrustacea
- Class: Insecta
- Order: Hemiptera
- Suborder: Auchenorrhyncha
- Family: Cicadidae
- Genus: Haemopsalta
- Species: H. georgina

Binomial name
- Haemopsalta georgina Owen & Moulds, 2016

Species of cicada

Haemopsalta georgina is a species of cicada, also known as the Tasmanian squeaker, in the true cicada family, Cicadettinae subfamily and Cicadettini tribe. It is endemic to Australia. It was described in 2016 by entomologists Christopher Owen and Maxwell Sydney Moulds.

== Etymology ==
The specific epithet georgina honours Georgina L. Davis in recognition of her contributions to scientific illustration.

== Description ==
The length of the forewing is 20–23 mm.

== Distribution and habitat ==
The species occurs in Tasmania from Poatina southwards to near Hobart, with an isolated population on Mount William in the Grampians National Park in western Victoria. Its associated habitat is cool temperate eucalypt forest.

== Behaviour ==
Adults appear in January, clinging to the foliage and branches of eucalypts, uttering repetitive, deep, metallic dit-derrrrrrr calls.
