= Pauropsalta stigmatica =

Scientific classification
- Kingdom: Animalia
- Phylum: Arthropoda
- Clade: Pancrustacea
- Class: Insecta
- Order: Hemiptera
- Suborder: Auchenorrhyncha
- Family: Cicadidae
- Genus: Pauropsalta
- Species: P. stigmatica

Binomial name
- Pauropsalta stigmatica Distant, 1905

Species of cicada

Pauropsalta stigmatica is a species of cicada in the true cicada family, Cicadettinae subfamily and Cicadettini tribe. It is endemic to Australia. It was described in 1905 by English entomologist William Lucas Distant.

== Taxonomy ==
The type specimen is a female, with the type location given as Adelaide in South Australia. Since there are there are no known associated male specimens, its identity is not resolved and it may be treated as a nomen dubium.
