= Tamasa burgessi =

Scientific classification
- Kingdom: Animalia
- Phylum: Arthropoda
- Clade: Pancrustacea
- Class: Insecta
- Order: Hemiptera
- Suborder: Auchenorrhyncha
- Family: Cicadidae
- Genus: Tamasa
- Species: T. burgessi

Binomial name
- Tamasa burgessi (Distant, 1905)

Synonyms
- Abricta burgessi Distant, 1905

Species of cicada

Tamasa burgessi, also known as the Cairns bunyip or two-toned bunyip, is a species of cicada in the true cicada family. It is endemic to Australia. It was described in 1905 by English entomologist William Lucas Distant.

== Description ==
The length of the forewing is 22–34 mm.

== Distribution and habitat ==
The species occurs in northern coastal Queensland from Cape Flattery to Townsville, extending inland to the Atherton Tableland. The associated habitat is tropical bushland, including swamp, coastal and riparian vegetation.

== Behaviour ==
Adults are heard from November to April, uttering long buzzing calls.
