= Pauropsalta walkeri =

Scientific classification
- Kingdom: Animalia
- Phylum: Arthropoda
- Clade: Pancrustacea
- Class: Insecta
- Order: Hemiptera
- Suborder: Auchenorrhyncha
- Family: Cicadidae
- Genus: Pauropsalta
- Species: P. sinavilla

Binomial name
- Pauropsalta sinavilla Moulds & Owen, 2011

Species of cicada

Pauropsalta walkeri is a species of cicada, also known as the Normanton squawker, in the true cicada family, Cicadettinae subfamily and Cicadettini tribe. It is endemic to Australia. It was described in 2011 by entomologists Maxwell Sydney Moulds and Christopher Owen.

== Etymology ==
The specific epithet walkeri honours Frederick Walker (1820–1866), an early pioneer and explorer of the area where the cicadas are found, as well as referring to the type locality of Walkers Creek.

== Description ==
The length of the forewing is 20–26 mm.

== Distribution and habitat ==
The species occurs from near Top Springs in the Northern Territory, eastwards into north-west Queensland along the Gulf of Carpentaria, to Normanton and Kynuna. The holotype specimen was collected at Walkers Creek, some 35 km north-north-east of Normanton. The associated habitat is eucalypt woodland, especially along watercourses.

== Behaviour ==
Adult males may be heard from December to February, clinging to the trunks and upper branches of eucalypts, emitting clicking and chirping calls.
