= Myopsalta bisonabilis =

Scientific classification
- Kingdom: Animalia
- Phylum: Arthropoda
- Clade: Pancrustacea
- Class: Insecta
- Order: Hemiptera
- Suborder: Auchenorrhyncha
- Family: Cicadidae
- Genus: Myopsalta
- Species: M. bisonabilis

Binomial name
- Myopsalta bisonabilis Popple & Stolarski, 2024

Species of cicada

Myopsalta bisonabilis is a species of cicada, also known as the Adelaide buzzer, in the true cicada family, Cicadettinae subfamily and Cicadettini tribe. It is endemic to Australia. It was described in 2024 by Australian entomologists Lindsay Popple and Alex Stolarski.

== Description ==
The length of the forewing is 13–18 mm.

== Distribution and habitat ==
The species occurs in the Adelaide region of South Australia from Port Germein southwards to Port Willunga, as well as on the Yorke Peninsula. Associated habitats include grassland, sedgeland and low shrubland.

== Behaviour ==
Adult males may be heard from October to January or February, clinging to low vegetation, uttering metallic, buzzing calls.
