= Myopsalta majurae =

Scientific classification
- Kingdom: Animalia
- Phylum: Arthropoda
- Clade: Pancrustacea
- Class: Insecta
- Order: Hemiptera
- Suborder: Auchenorrhyncha
- Family: Cicadidae
- Genus: Myopsalta
- Species: M. majurae

Binomial name
- Myopsalta majurae Popple, 2017

Species of cicada

Myopsalta majurae is a species of cicada, also known as the Mount Ainslie buzzer, in the true cicada family, Cicadettinae subfamily and Cicadettini tribe. It is endemic to Australia. It was described in 2017 by Australian entomologist Lindsay Popple.

== Etymology ==
The specific epithet majurae is derived from Mount Majura in Canberra, an important location, along with neighbouring Mount Ainslie, for early records of the cicadas.

== Description ==
The length of the forewing is 16–17 mm.

== Distribution and habitat ==
The species is known from Mounts Majura and Ainslie in Canberra, in the Australian Capital Territory, as well as from Mudgee in the Central West region of New South Wales. The associated habitat is open woodland.

== Behaviour ==
Adult males may be heard in December and January, clinging to the foliage of trees and shrubs, uttering brief, buzzing calls punctuated by quick ur-chip notes.
