= Pauropsalta kriki =

Scientific classification
- Kingdom: Animalia
- Phylum: Arthropoda
- Clade: Pancrustacea
- Class: Insecta
- Order: Hemiptera
- Suborder: Auchenorrhyncha
- Family: Cicadidae
- Genus: Pauropsalta
- Species: P. kriki

Binomial name
- Pauropsalta kriki Owen & Moulds, 2016

Species of cicada

Pauropsalta kriki is a species of cicada, also known as the river galloper, in the true cicada family, Cicadettinae subfamily and Cicadettini tribe. It is endemic to Australia. It was described in 2016 by entomologists Christopher Owen and Maxwell Sydney Moulds.

== Etymology ==
The specific epithet kriki, from Greek kriko (‘along a watercourse’), refers to the cicadas' favoured habitat.

== Description ==
The length of the forewing is 18–24 mm.

== Distribution and habitat ==
The species occurs the Top End of the Northern Territory from Darwin southwards to Mataranka and eastwards to Kakadu National Park. The associated habitat is eucalypt woodland and riparian shrubland.

== Behaviour ==
Adult males may be heard from October to February, emitting repetitive, ratchet-like calls, similar to the sound of a galloping horse.
