= Myopsalta platyptera =

Scientific classification
- Kingdom: Animalia
- Phylum: Arthropoda
- Clade: Pancrustacea
- Class: Insecta
- Order: Hemiptera
- Suborder: Auchenorrhyncha
- Family: Cicadidae
- Genus: Myopsalta
- Species: M. platyptera

Binomial name
- Myopsalta platyptera Popple, 2017

Species of cicada

Myopsalta platyptera is a species of cicada, also known as the Theodore chirper, in the true cicada family, Cicadettinae subfamily and Cicadettini tribe. It is endemic to Australia. It was described in 2017 by Australian entomologist Lindsay Popple.

== Etymology ==
The specific epithet platyptera is derived from Greek platýs and pteros, meaning ‘broad-winged’ with reference to the cicadas’ relatively broad, rounded wings.

== Description ==
The length of the forewing is 15–18 mm.

== Distribution and habitat ==
The species is only known from the Brigalow Research Station near Theodore in Central Queensland. The associated habitat is brigalow woodland and shrubland.

== Behaviour ==
Adult males may be heard in January, clinging to the branches of brigalow trees, uttering chirping calls.
