= Heremusina =

Scientific classification
- Kingdom: Animalia
- Phylum: Arthropoda
- Clade: Pancrustacea
- Class: Insecta
- Order: Hemiptera
- Suborder: Auchenorrhyncha
- Infraorder: Cicadomorpha
- Superfamily: Cicadoidea
- Family: Cicadidae
- Subfamily: Cicadettinae
- Genus: Heremusina; Ewart, 2018

Genus of cicadas

Heremusina is a genus of cicadas, also known as watch-winders, in the family Cicadidae, subfamily Cicadettinae and tribe Cicadettini. It is endemic to Australia. It was described in 2018 by Australian entomologist Anthony Ewart.

== Species ==
As of 2025 there were two described species in the genus:

- Heremusina pipatio Ewart, 2018 (Cloncurry Watch-winder)
- Heremusina udeoecetes Ewart, 2018 (Alice Springs Watch-winder)
