= Mugadina =

Scientific classification
- Kingdom: Animalia
- Phylum: Arthropoda
- Clade: Pancrustacea
- Class: Insecta
- Order: Hemiptera
- Suborder: Auchenorrhyncha
- Family: Cicadidae
- Subfamily: Cicadettinae
- Genus: Mugadina; Moulds, 2012

Genus of cicadas

Mugadina is a genus of cicadas, also known as grass-tickers, in the family Cicadidae, subfamily Cicadettinae and tribe Cicadettini. It was described in 2012 by Australian entomologist Maxwell Sydney Moulds.

== Etymology ==
The genus name Mugadina is an arbitrary combination of letters.

== Species ==
As of 2025 there were five described species in the genus:

- Mugadina cloncurryi Ewart, 2022 (Straw Grass-ticker)
- Mugadina emma (Goding & Froggatt, 1904) (Amber Grass-ticker)
- Mugadina hamiltoni Ewart, 2022 (Hamilton Grass-ticker)
- Mugadina marshalli (Distant, 1911) (Yellow Grass-ticker)
- Mugadina superba Ewart & Moulds, 2021 (Superb Grass-ticker)
