= Xeropsalta rattrayi =

Scientific classification
- Kingdom: Animalia
- Phylum: Arthropoda
- Clade: Pancrustacea
- Class: Insecta
- Order: Hemiptera
- Suborder: Auchenorrhyncha
- Family: Cicadidae
- Genus: Xeropsalta
- Species: X. rattrayi

Binomial name
- Xeropsalta rattrayi Ewart, 2018

Species of cicada

Xeropsalta rattrayi is a species of cicada, also known as the green grass-shaker, in the true cicada family, Cicadettinae subfamily and Cicadettini tribe. The species is endemic to Australia. It was described in 2018 by Australian entomologist Anthony Ewart.

== Description ==
The length of the forewing is 13–15 mm.

== Distribution and habitat ==
The species is only known from the vicinity of Adavale and Barcaldine in Central West Queensland. The associated habitat is open grassland near water.

== Behaviour ==
Adult males may be heard in January, clinging to the stems of grasses, emitting strident calls with a terminal “twang”.
