= Walter Wilson Froggatt =

Australian economic entomologist

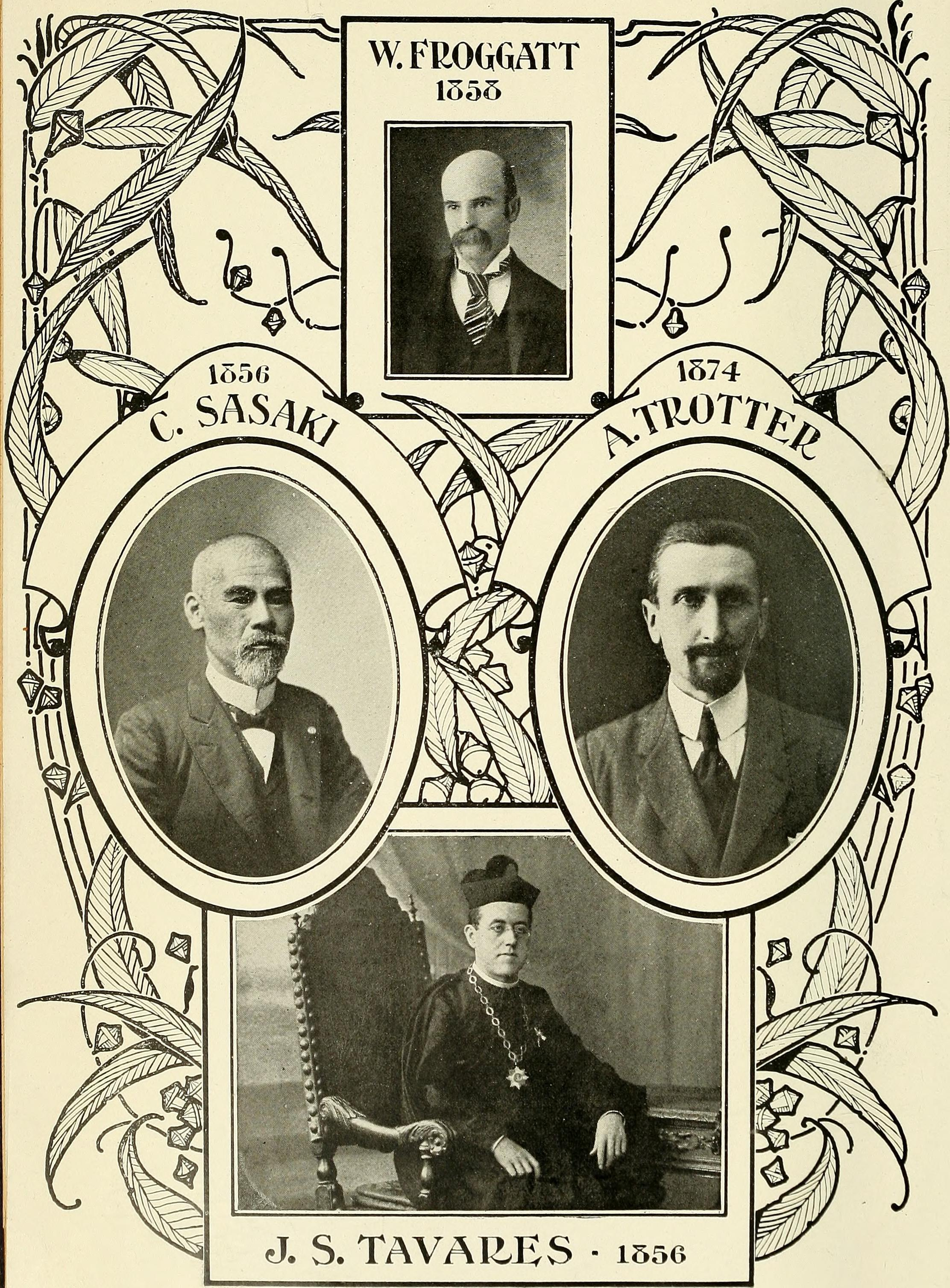
Walter Wilson Froggatt (top) and other scientists

Walter Wilson Froggatt (13 June 1858 – 18 March 1937) was an Australian economic entomologist. During his final years, Froggatt was the only solid public opponent of the ultimately disastrous introduction of the poisonous cane toad into Queensland to control beetle pests in sugar cane – a view which cost him many supporters in Australia's Council for Scientific and Industrial Research (CSIR), among fellow economic entomologists (e.g., the HSPA's Cyril Pemberton), and even in the newspapers of the day.

== Works ==
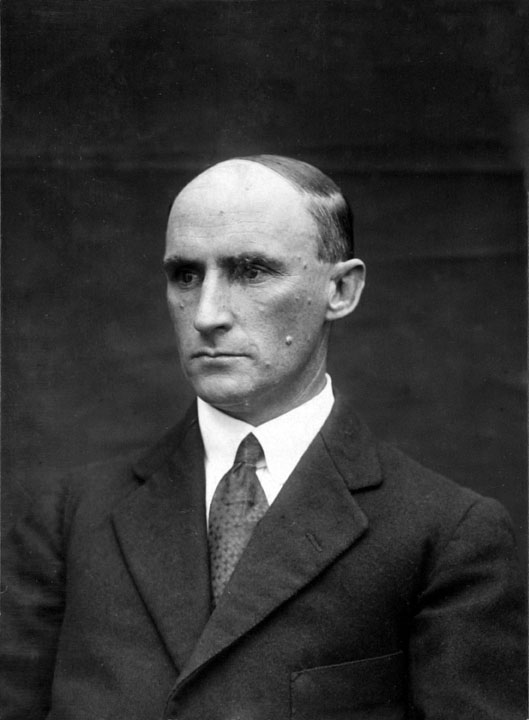
Froggatt’s son John Lewis Froggatt, also an entomologist

Partial list

- Notes on Australian Cynipidae, with descriptions of several new species. Proc. Linn. Soc. N. S. W. 7: 152–156 (1892).
- Insects living in figs, with some account of caprification. Agric. Gaz. N. S. W. 11: 447–456, 1 pl. (1900).
- with Frederic Webster Goding, F. W. Monograph of the Australian Cicadidae. Proceedings of the Linnean Society of New South Wales 29(3): 561–670 (1904).
- The insects of the Kurrajong (Brachychiton populaneum). Agric. Gaz. N. S. W. 16: 226–234, 2 pls (1905).
- Australian Insects. 8vo. Pp. i–xiv, 1–449, 37 pls. Sydney (1907).
- A new parasite on sheep-maggot flies. Notes and description of a chalcid parasite (Chalcis calliphorae). Qld. Agric. J. 6: 177–179 (1916).
- The Appleleaf Jassid (Empoasca australis). Agricultural Gazette of New South Wales 29: 568–570 (1918).
- The digger chalcid parasite (Dirrhinus sarcophagae sp. n. on Sarcophaga aurifrons). Agric. Gaz. N. S. W. 30: 853–855 (1919).
- Sheep-maggot flies and their parasites. Agric. Gaz. N. S. W. 32: 725–731, 807–813 (1921). Hathitrust link
- Notes on the Spiny Green Phasma (Extatosoma tiaratum). Australian Naturalist, Sydney, iv, 16, 1 October, pp. 235–237 (1921)
- Description of a new phasma belonging to the genus Extatosoma. Proc. Linn. Soc. NSW, 47: 344–345, pl. 38 (1922) Online
- Forest Insects of Australia. 8vo. Sydney. Pp. i–viii, 1–171, 2 col. pls., 44 full pls., 33 text-blocks (1923)
- Forest insects and timber borers. Privately published iv +107 pp. (1927).

== Legacy and Memoria ==
The Froggatt Prize for Science at the Presbyterian Ladies' College, Sydney (the school which Froggatt's daughters attended) is named in his honour.

The Froggatt Awards are named in his honor, and are awarded by the Invasive Species Council of Australia.

The insect genus Froggattisca is named after him, as is the plant species Pseuduvaria froggattii.
