= Frederic Webster Goding =

American physician and naturalist

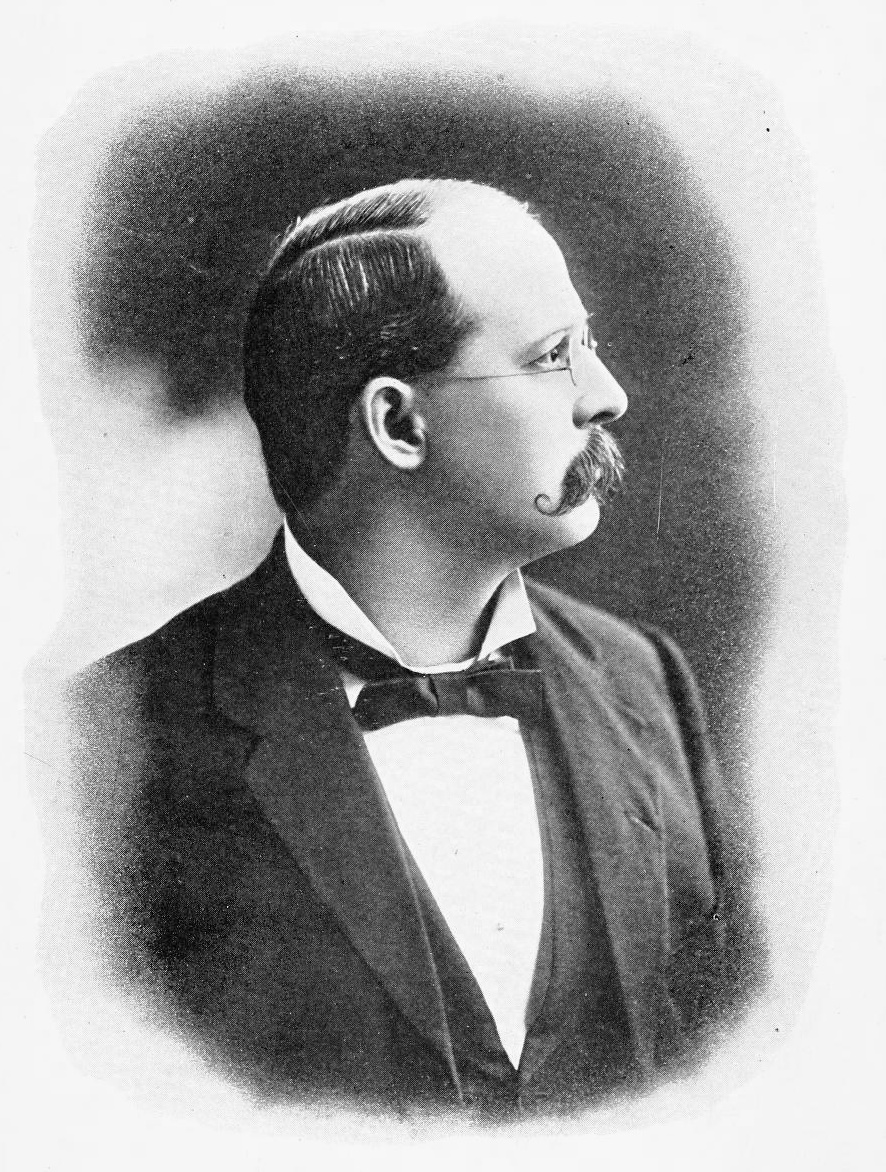
Frederic Webster Goding

Frederic Webster Goding (May 9, 1858 – May 5, 1933) was an American diplomat, physician, entomologist, and inventor who served as U.S. consul in Australia, Uruguay, and Ecuador. As an entomologist he was noted for his studies of treehoppers (Membracidae).

Born in the Hyde Park neighborhood of Boston to Alphonso Landon and Lydia Mehitable (Chandler) Goding, at age five moved with his family to Chicago where he attended public school. He entered the medical department of Northwestern University, where he earned the degree of M.D. in 1882, having previously taught in the public schools of Illinois. He practiced medicine until 1898. During 1885-86 he filled the chair of natural science in Loudon College (prep school) in Loudon, Tennessee. He was assistant to the state entomologist of Illinois in 1884-95, and held a similar position in Tennessee while connected with Loudon College.

He was a delegate to the Republican state conventions of Illinois when Governors Joseph W. Fifer and John R. Tanner were nominated (1886, 1896), besides frequently serving as delegate to various county and congressional conventions. He was mayor of Rutland, Illinois from 1887 to 1897. In 1898 he was appointed consul to the New South Wales and Queensland, Australia, in which he served until 1908, and was appointed consul to represent Cuba in Australia in 1902. He was subsequently consul at Montevideo, Uruguay (1908–1913), and consul-general at Guayaquil, Ecuador (1913–1917). He is commemorated in the scientific name of the cactus Armatocereus godingianus.
