= Cognadanga isos =

Scientific classification
- Kingdom: Animalia
- Phylum: Arthropoda
- Clade: Pancrustacea
- Class: Insecta
- Order: Hemiptera
- Suborder: Auchenorrhyncha
- Family: Cicadidae
- Genus: Cognadanga
- Species: C. isos

Binomial name
- Cognadanga isos Moulds & Marshall, 2025

Species of cicada

Cognadanga isos is a species of cicada, also known as the Woomera urchip, in the family, Cicadidae, subfamily Cicadettinae and tribe Cicadettini. The species is endemic to Australia. It was described in 2025 by Australian entomologists Maxwell Sydney Moulds and David C. Marshall.

== Etymology ==
The specific epithet isos – Greek: ίσος (“equal”) – refers to the similarity to Cognadanga capricornica.

== Description ==
The length of the forewing is 12–14 mm. Body length is 12–14 mm.

== Distribution and habitat ==
The species occurs in South Australia, where it is only known from sites along the Stuart Highway between 50 km north and 100 km south of Coober Pedy. The associated habitat is arid shrubland where the cicadas inhabit saltbush and bluebush.

== Behaviour ==
Adult males emit complex buzzing calls of repeated “de-deee” phrases.
