= Popplepsalta decora =

Scientific classification
- Kingdom: Animalia
- Phylum: Arthropoda
- Clade: Pancrustacea
- Class: Insecta
- Order: Hemiptera
- Suborder: Auchenorrhyncha
- Family: Cicadidae
- Genus: Popplepsalta
- Species: P. decora

Binomial name
- Popplepsalta decora (Popple, 2013)

Synonyms
- Pauropsalta decora Popple, 2013

Species of cicada

Popplepsalta decora is a species of cicada, also known as the static squeaker, in the true cicada family, Cicadettinae subfamily and Cicadettini tribe. The species is endemic to Australia. It was described in 2013 by Australian entomologist Lindsay Popple.

== Description ==
The length of the forewing is 15–18 mm.

== Distribution and habitat ==
The species occurs in central and southern Queensland from Greenvale southwards to Boggabilla in northern New South Wales. The associated habitat is dry eucalypt woodland, especially with gum-topped box trees, near water.

== Behaviour ==
Adult males may be heard from October to March, clinging to the upper branches and foliage of eucalypts, emitting sustained rattling and chirping calls.
