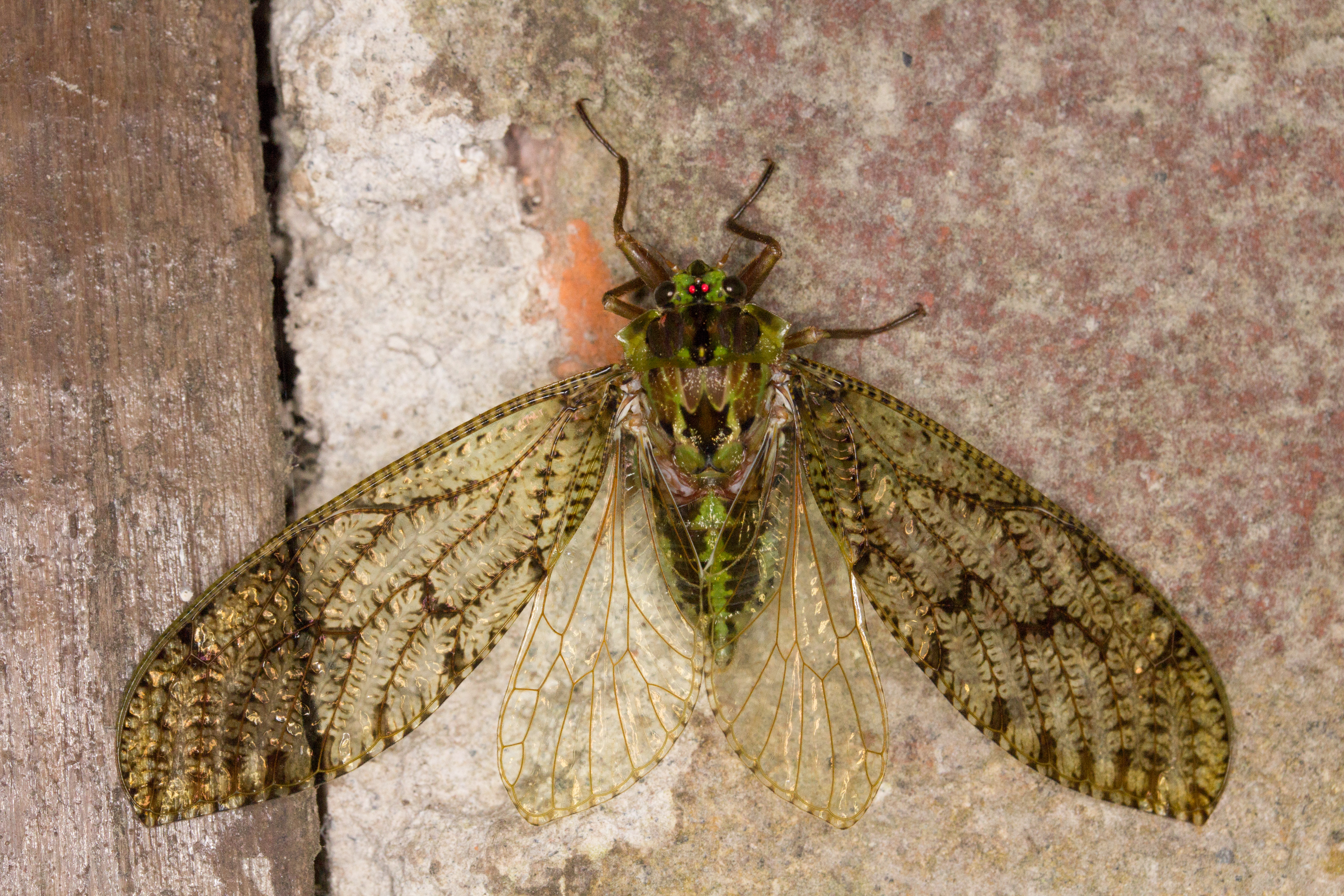
- Onoralna falcata

Scientific classification
- Kingdom: Animalia
- Phylum: Arthropoda
- Clade: Pancrustacea
- Class: Insecta
- Order: Hemiptera
- Suborder: Auchenorrhyncha
- Family: Cicadidae
- Subfamily: Cicadettinae
- Tribe: Dazini; Kato, 1932

= Dazini =

Tribe of true bugs

Dazini is a tribe of cicadas in the family Cicadidae. There are at least four genera and about eight described species in Dazini.

== Genera ==
These four genera belong to the tribe Dazini:

- Aragualna Champanhet, Boulard and Gaiani, 2000^{i c g}
- Daza Distant, 1905^{i c g}
- Onoralna Boulard, 1996^{i c g}
- Procollina Metcalf, 1952^{i c g}

Data sources: i = ITIS, c = Catalogue of Life, g = GBIF, b = Bugguide.net
