= Cognadanga =

Scientific classification
- Kingdom: Animalia
- Phylum: Arthropoda
- Clade: Pancrustacea
- Class: Insecta
- Order: Hemiptera
- Suborder: Auchenorrhyncha
- Family: Cicadidae
- Subfamily: Cicadettinae
- Tribe: Cicadettini
- Genus: Cognadanga; Moulds & Marshall, 2025

Genus of cicadas

Cognadanga is a genus of cicadas in the family Cicadidae, subfamily Cicadettinae and tribe Cicadettini. It is endemic to Australia. It was described in 2025 by Australian entomologists Maxwell Sydney Moulds and David C. Marshall.

== Etymology ==
The generic name Cognadanga is a combination derived from Latin cognatus (“related”) and the genus Gudanga, referring to their close relationship.

== Species ==
As of 2025 the genus contained two valid species:

- Cognadanga capricornica Moulds & Marshall, 2025 (Asphalt Cicada)
- Cognadanga isos Moulds & Marshall, 2025 (Woomera Urchip)
