= Gudanga boulayi =

Scientific classification
- Kingdom: Animalia
- Phylum: Arthropoda
- Clade: Pancrustacea
- Class: Insecta
- Order: Hemiptera
- Suborder: Auchenorrhyncha
- Family: Cicadidae
- Genus: Gudanga
- Species: G. boulayi

Binomial name
- Gudanga boulayi Distant, 1905

Species of cicada

Gudanga boulayi is a species of cicada, also known as the red blackwing, in the true cicada family, Cicadettinae subfamily and Cicadettini tribe. It is endemic to Australia. It was described in 1905 by English entomologist William Lucas Distant.

== Description ==
The length of the forewing is 15–22 mm.

== Distribution and habitat ==
The species occurs in south-west Western Australia in the area from Murchison River east to Kalgoorlie and south to Katanning and Kulikup. The holotype was collected at Champion Bay. Its associated habitat is tall, open Acacia woodland.

== Behaviour ==
Adults appear from October to February, clinging to the trunks and upper branches of wattle trees, including mulga.
