= Physeema convergens =

Scientific classification
- Kingdom: Animalia
- Phylum: Arthropoda
- Clade: Pancrustacea
- Class: Insecta
- Order: Hemiptera
- Suborder: Auchenorrhyncha
- Family: Cicadidae
- Genus: Physeema
- Species: P. convergens

Binomial name
- Physeema convergens (Walker, 1850)

Synonyms
- Cicada convergens Walker, 1850; Cicadetta convergens (Walker, 1850); Melampsalta cylindricata Ashton, 1912

Species of cicada

Physeema convergens is a species of cicada, also known as the duke, in the true cicada family, Cicadettinae subfamily and Cicadettini tribe. The species is endemic to Australia. It was described in 1850 by English entomologist Francis Walker.

== Description ==
The length of the forewing is 30–36 mm.

== Distribution and habitat ==
The species occurs in south-west Western Australia from Guilderton eastwards to Mount Ragged and Balladonia. Associated habitats include open forest, woodland and heath.

== Behaviour ==
Adult males may be heard from November to February, clinging to the trunks, branches and stems of trees and shrubs, emitting loud, fast, clicking calls.
