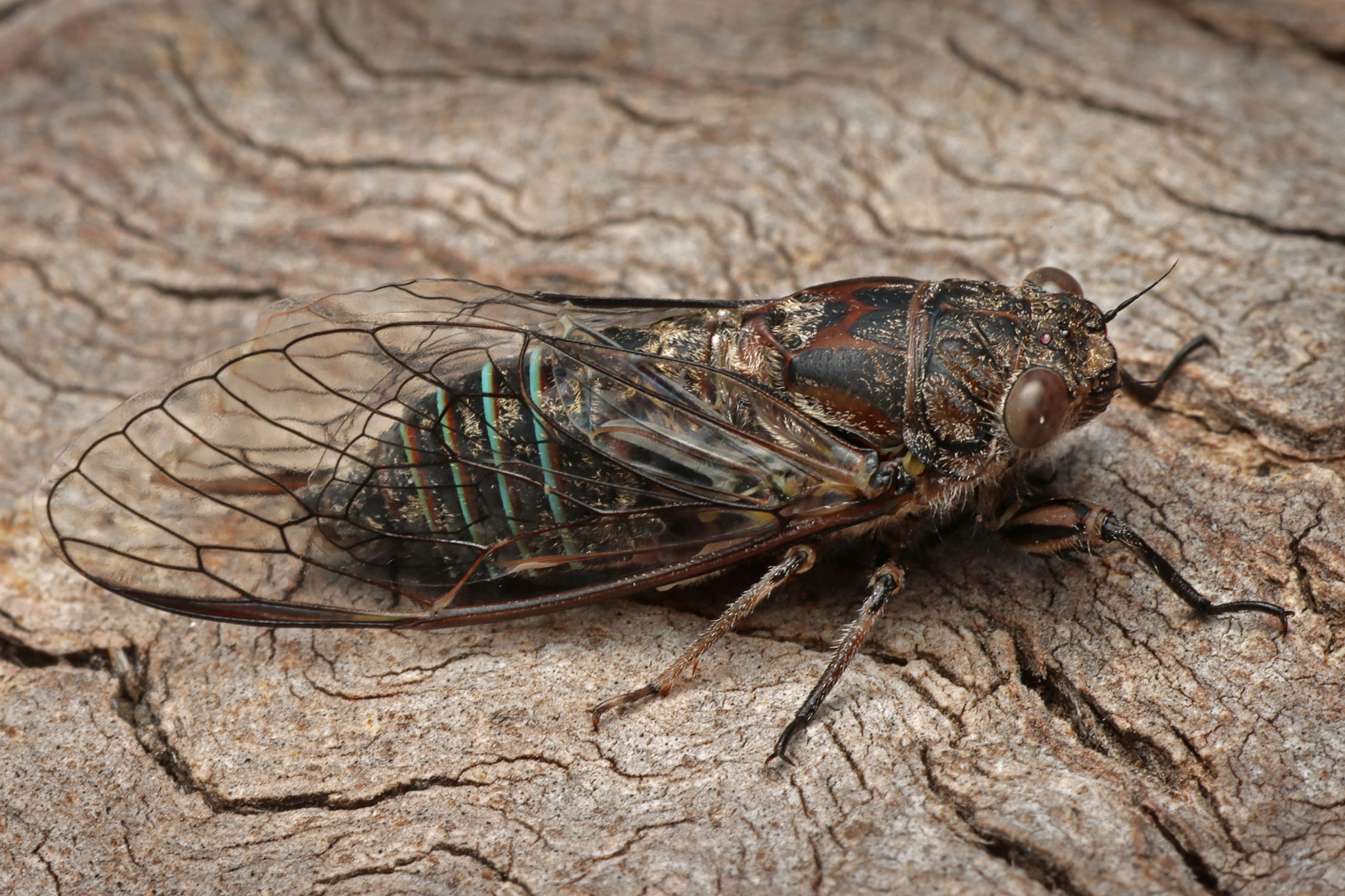

Scientific classification
- Kingdom: Animalia
- Phylum: Arthropoda
- Clade: Pancrustacea
- Class: Insecta
- Order: Hemiptera
- Suborder: Auchenorrhyncha
- Family: Cicadidae
- Genus: Physeema
- Species: P. labyrinthica

Binomial name
- Physeema labyrinthica (Walker, 1850)

Synonyms
- Dundubia labyrinthica Walker, 1850; Cicadetta labyrinthica (Walker, 1850); Cicada interstans Walker, 1858

= Physeema labyrinthica =

Species of cicada

Physeema labyrinthica is a species of cicada, also known as the dune ticker or southern coastal ticker, in the true cicada family, Cicadettinae subfamily and Cicadettini tribe. The species is endemic to Australia. It was described in 1850 by English entomologist Francis Walker.

== Description ==
The length of the forewing is 18–22 mm.

== Distribution and habitat ==
The species occurs in coastal areas of southern mainland Australia from the Eyre Peninsula in South Australia eastwards to Wilsons Promontory in Victoria. Associated habitats include coastal shrubland, mallee and heath.

== Behaviour ==
Adult males may be heard while clinging to the stems of trees and shrubs, emitting strident clicking calls.
