= Calipsalta brunnea =

Scientific classification
- Kingdom: Animalia
- Phylum: Arthropoda
- Clade: Pancrustacea
- Class: Insecta
- Order: Hemiptera
- Suborder: Auchenorrhyncha
- Family: Cicadidae
- Genus: Calipsalta
- Species: C. brunnea

Binomial name
- Calipsalta brunnea Moulds & Marshall, 2022

Species of cicada

Calipsalta brunnea is a species of cicada, also known as the brown spinifex rattler, in the true cicada family, Cicadettinae subfamily and Cicadettini tribe. It is endemic to Australia. It was described in 2022 by Australian entomologists Maxwell Sydney Moulds and David C. Marshall.

== Etymology ==
The species epithet brunnea is derived from Latin brunneus ('dusky' or 'tawny'), with reference to the cicadas' colouration.

== Description ==
The length of the forewing is 21–28 mm.

== Distribution and habitat ==
The species' range covers much of arid central Australia, including the Great Sandy Desert in north-west Western Australia, through the southern Northern Territory and far north South Australia, through to the eastern margins of the Simpson Desert in western Queensland. The associated habitat is low, open, shrubland with spinifex and other grasses.

== Behaviour ==
Adults may be heard from November to February, uttering fast, rattling calls during the day and especially at dusk.
