= Calipsalta =

Scientific classification
- Kingdom: Animalia
- Phylum: Arthropoda
- Clade: Pancrustacea
- Class: Insecta
- Order: Hemiptera
- Suborder: Auchenorrhyncha
- Infraorder: Cicadomorpha
- Superfamily: Cicadoidea
- Family: Cicadidae
- Subfamily: Cicadettinae
- Genus: Calipsalta; Moulds & Marshall, 2022

Genus of cicadas

Calipsalta is a genus of cicadas, also known as spinifex rattlers, in the family Cicadidae, subfamily Cicadettinae and tribe Cicadettini. It is endemic to Australia. It was described in 2022 by Australian entomologists Maxwell Sydney Moulds and David C. Marshall.

== Etymology ==
The genus name Calipsalta is a combination derived from Latin calidus (‘warm’ or ‘hot’), referring to the climate of the species’ favoured habitat, with psalta, a traditional suffix used in the generic names of many cicadas.

== Species ==
As of 2025 there were three described species in the genus:

- Calipsalta brunnea Moulds & Marshall, 2022 (Brown Spinifex Rattler)
- Calipsalta fumosa Moulds & Marshall, 2022 (Pale Green Spinifex Rattler)
- Calipsalta viridans Moulds & Marshall, 2022 (Green Spinifex Rattler)
