= Terepsalta infans =

Scientific classification
- Kingdom: Animalia
- Phylum: Arthropoda
- Clade: Pancrustacea
- Class: Insecta
- Order: Hemiptera
- Suborder: Auchenorrhyncha
- Family: Cicadidae
- Genus: Terepsalta
- Species: T. infans

Binomial name
- Terepsalta infans (Walker, 1850)

Synonyms
- Cicada infans Walker, 1850; Cicada abbreviata Walker, 1862; Melampsalta abbreviata (Walker, 1862); Quintilia infans (Walker, 1850); Tibicen infans (Walker, 1850)

Species of cicada

Terepsalta infans is a species of cicada, also known as the southern stubby grass-ticker, in the true cicada family, Cicadettinae subfamily and Cicadettini tribe. The species is endemic to Australia. It was described in 1850 by English entomologist Francis Walker.

== Description ==
The length of the forewing is 13–16 mm.

== Distribution and habitat ==
The species occurs in western Queensland and eastern South Australia. Associated habitats include semi-arid open grassland and grassy woodland.

== Behaviour ==
Adult males may be heard while clinging to grass stems, emitting buzzing, rattling and chirping calls.
