= Terepsalta leichhardti =

Scientific classification
- Kingdom: Animalia
- Phylum: Arthropoda
- Clade: Pancrustacea
- Class: Insecta
- Order: Hemiptera
- Suborder: Auchenorrhyncha
- Family: Cicadidae
- Genus: Terepsalta
- Species: T. leichhardti

Binomial name
- Terepsalta leichhardti Ewart, 2013

Species of cicada

Terepsalta leichhardti is a species of cicada, also known as the northern stubby grass-ticker, in the true cicada family, Cicadettinae subfamily and Cicadettini tribe. The species is endemic to Australia. It was described in 2013 by Australian entomologist Anthony Ewart.

== Etymology ==
The specific epithet leichhardti refers to the Leichhardt River, which runs through Mount Isa and the adjacent grasslands of the cicadas’ habitat.

== Description ==
The length of the forewing is 13–16 mm.

== Distribution and habitat ==
The species is only known from the vicinity of Mount Isa in north-western Queensland. Associated habitats include open grassland and grassy woodland.

== Behaviour ==
Adult males may be heard in January, clinging to grass stems, emitting chirping and rattling calls.
