= Calipsalta viridans =

Scientific classification
- Kingdom: Animalia
- Phylum: Arthropoda
- Clade: Pancrustacea
- Class: Insecta
- Order: Hemiptera
- Suborder: Auchenorrhyncha
- Family: Cicadidae
- Genus: Calipsalta
- Species: C. viridans

Binomial name
- Calipsalta viridans Moulds & Marshall, 2022

Species of cicada

Calipsalta viridans is a species of cicada, also known as the green spinifex rattler, in the true cicada family, Cicadettinae subfamily and Cicadettini tribe. It is endemic to Australia. It was described in 2022 by Australian entomologists Maxwell Sydney Moulds and David C. Marshall.

== Etymology ==
The species epithet viridans is derived from Latin virido (to make or become green), with reference to the cicadas' colouration.

== Description ==
The length of the forewing is 20–23 mm.

== Distribution and habitat ==
The species' range extends from central and northern Western Australia into far north South Australia. The associated habitat is low, open, shrubland with spinifex and other grasses.

== Behaviour ==
Adults may be heard from December to February, uttering fine rattling or buzzing calls.
