= Terepsalta =

Scientific classification
- Kingdom: Animalia
- Phylum: Arthropoda
- Clade: Pancrustacea
- Class: Insecta
- Order: Hemiptera
- Suborder: Auchenorrhyncha
- Infraorder: Cicadomorpha
- Superfamily: Cicadoidea
- Family: Cicadidae
- Subfamily: Cicadettinae
- Genus: Terepsalta; Moulds, 2012

Genus of cicadas

Terepsalta is a genus of cicadas, also known as grass-tickers, in the family Cicadidae, subfamily Cicadettinae and tribe Cicadettini. It is endemic to Australia. It was described in 2012 by Australian entomologist Maxwell Sydney Moulds.

== Etymology ==
The genus name Terepsalta is a combination derived from Latin teres (‘rounded’ or ‘cylindrical’), with reference to the shape of the male abdomen, and psalta (from Latin psaltria – a female harpist), a suffix traditionally used in the names of many cicada genera.

== Species ==
As of 2025 there were two described species in the genus:

- Terepsalta infans (Walker, 1850) (Southern Stubby Grass-ticker)
- Terepsalta leichhardti Ewart, 2013 (Northern Stubby Grass-ticker)
