= Gudanga aurea =

Scientific classification
- Kingdom: Animalia
- Phylum: Arthropoda
- Clade: Pancrustacea
- Class: Insecta
- Order: Hemiptera
- Suborder: Auchenorrhyncha
- Family: Cicadidae
- Genus: Gudanga
- Species: G. aurea

Binomial name
- Gudanga aurea Moulds, 1996

Species of cicada

Gudanga aurea is a species of cicada, also known as the golden blackwing, in the true cicada family, Cicadettinae subfamily and Cicadettini tribe. It is endemic to Australia. It was described in 1996 by Australian entomologist Maxwell Sydney Moulds.

== Etymology ==
The specific epithet aurea is derived from Latin: aurum (gold), with reference to the cicadas’ golden colouration, as well as to their range being rich in gold deposits.

== Description ==
The length of the forewing is 17–26 mm.

== Distribution and habitat ==
The species occurs between Kumarina, Wiluna, Kalgoorlie and Mount Magnet in central Western Australia. Its associated habitat includes woodlands with mulga or other acacias.

== Behaviour ==
Adults appear from January to March, clinging to the trunks and branches of the trees.
