= Chelapsalta =

Scientific classification
- Kingdom: Animalia
- Phylum: Arthropoda
- Clade: Pancrustacea
- Class: Insecta
- Order: Hemiptera
- Suborder: Auchenorrhyncha
- Infraorder: Cicadomorpha
- Superfamily: Cicadoidea
- Family: Cicadidae
- Subfamily: Cicadettinae
- Genus: Chelapsalta; Moulds, 2012

Genus of cicadas

Chelapsalta is a genus of cicadas in the family Cicadidae, subfamily Cicadettinae and tribe Cicadettini. It was described in 2012 by Australian entomologist Maxwell Sydney Moulds. The cicadas are found in inland south-eastern Australia.

== Etymology ==
The genus name Chelapsalta is a combination derived from the Greek chelo (claw), with reference to the shape of the male genitalia, and Latin psaltria (a female harpist).

== Species ==
As of 2025 there were two described species in the genus:

- Chelapsalta myoporae Ewart, Popple & Marshall, 2015 (Copper Shrub-buzzer)
- Chelapsalta puer (Walker, 1850) (Cassinia Cicada)
