= Gudanga lithgowae =

Scientific classification
- Kingdom: Animalia
- Phylum: Arthropoda
- Clade: Pancrustacea
- Class: Insecta
- Order: Hemiptera
- Suborder: Auchenorrhyncha
- Family: Cicadidae
- Genus: Gudanga
- Species: G. lithgowae

Binomial name
- Gudanga lithgowae Ewart & Popple, 2013

Species of cicada

Gudanga lithgowae is a species of cicada, also known as the southern brigalow blackwing, in the true cicada family, Cicadettinae subfamily and Cicadettini tribe. It is endemic to Australia. It was described in 2013 by entomologists Anthony Ewart and Lindsay Popple.

== Etymology ==
The specific epithet lithgowae honours Grace Lithgow of ‘Allinga’ Homestead, Chinchilla, who collected some of the first specimens, as well as recording the natural history of the Chinchilla region.

== Description ==
The length of the forewing is 14–20 mm.

== Distribution and habitat ==
The species occurs in the southern Brigalow Belt bioregion from Chinchilla in southern Queensland southwards to Trangie in central New South Wales. Its associated habitat is brigalow woodland as well as coolabah trees.

== Behaviour ==
Adults are heard from November to January, clinging to the trunks and upper branches of dark-barked trees, uttering calls characterised by relatively slow phrases of triple chirps.
