= Gagatopsalta =

Scientific classification
- Kingdom: Animalia
- Phylum: Arthropoda
- Clade: Pancrustacea
- Class: Insecta
- Order: Hemiptera
- Suborder: Auchenorrhyncha
- Family: Cicadidae
- Subfamily: Cicadettinae
- Genus: Gagatopsalta; Ewart, 2005

Genus of cicadas

Gagatopsalta is a genus of cicadas in the family Cicadidae, subfamily Cicadettinae and tribe Cicadettini. It is endemic to Australia. It was described in 2005 by Australian entomologist Anthony Ewart.

== Etymology ==
The genus name Gagatopsalta is a combination derived from gagato (jet-black), with reference to the shiny black colouration of the cicadas, and psalta, a traditional suffix used in the generic names of many cicada species.

== Species ==
As of 2025 there were two described species in the genus:

- Gagatopsalta auranti Ewart, 2005 (Painted Brigalow Ticker)
- Gagatopsalta obscura Ewart, 2005 (Clip-clop Cicada)
