= Toxala mckinnonae =

Scientific classification
- Kingdom: Animalia
- Phylum: Arthropoda
- Clade: Pancrustacea
- Class: Insecta
- Order: Hemiptera
- Suborder: Auchenorrhyncha
- Family: Cicadidae
- Genus: Toxala
- Species: T. mckinnonae

Binomial name
- Toxala mckinnonae Popple, 2015

Species of cicada

Toxala mckinnonae is a species of cicada, also known as the Herberton grass-buzzer, in the true cicada family, Cicadettinae subfamily and Cicadettini tribe. The species is endemic to Australia. It was described in 2015 by Australian entomologist Lindsay Popple.

== Description ==
The length of the forewing is 10–12 mm.

== Distribution and habitat ==
The species is only known from a small area west of Herberton in Far North Queensland. The associated habitat is native grassland on sandy loam soils.

== Behaviour ==
Adult males may be heard from December to January, clinging to grass stems, emitting high-pitched, chirping and buzzing calls with accompanying wing-snaps, after rain.
