= Toxala verna =

Scientific classification
- Kingdom: Animalia
- Phylum: Arthropoda
- Clade: Pancrustacea
- Class: Insecta
- Order: Hemiptera
- Suborder: Auchenorrhyncha
- Family: Cicadidae
- Genus: Toxala
- Species: T. verna

Binomial name
- Toxala verna (Distant, 1912)

Synonyms
- Urabunana verna Distant, 1912; Curvicicada verna Chou et al, 1997

Species of cicada

Toxala verna is a species of cicada, also known as the bent-winged grass-buzzer, in the true cicada family, Cicadettinae subfamily and Cicadettini tribe. The species is endemic to Australia. It was described in 1912 by English entomologist William Lucas Distant.

== Description ==
The length of the forewing is 12–13 mm.

== Distribution and habitat ==
The species occurs in south-eastern Queensland and north-eastern New South Wales as well as near Goulburn. Associated habitats include native grassland and heathy woodland with eucalypts and Pimelea shrubs.

== Behaviour ==
Adult males may be heard from January to March, clinging to grass stems, emitting chirping and buzzing calls with accompanying wing-snaps.
