= Popplepsalta torrensis =

Scientific classification
- Kingdom: Animalia
- Phylum: Arthropoda
- Clade: Pancrustacea
- Class: Insecta
- Order: Hemiptera
- Suborder: Auchenorrhyncha
- Family: Cicadidae
- Genus: Popplepsalta
- Species: P. torrensis

Binomial name
- Popplepsalta torrensis (Popple, 2013)

Synonyms
- Pauropsalta torrensis Popple, 2013

Species of cicada

Popplepsalta torrensis is a species of cicada, also known as the Hughenden red-eyed squeaker, in the true cicada family, Cicadettinae subfamily and Cicadettini tribe. The species is endemic to Australia. It was described in 2013 by Australian entomologist Lindsay Popple.

== Description ==
The length of the forewing is 15–18 mm.

== Distribution and habitat ==
The species is only known from northern Queensland in the area between Hughenden and the White Mountains National Park. The associated habitat is ironbark and box eucalypts growing on sandy soils.

== Behaviour ==
Adult males may be heard while clinging to the foliage and upper branches of eucalypts, emitting fast chirping calls.
