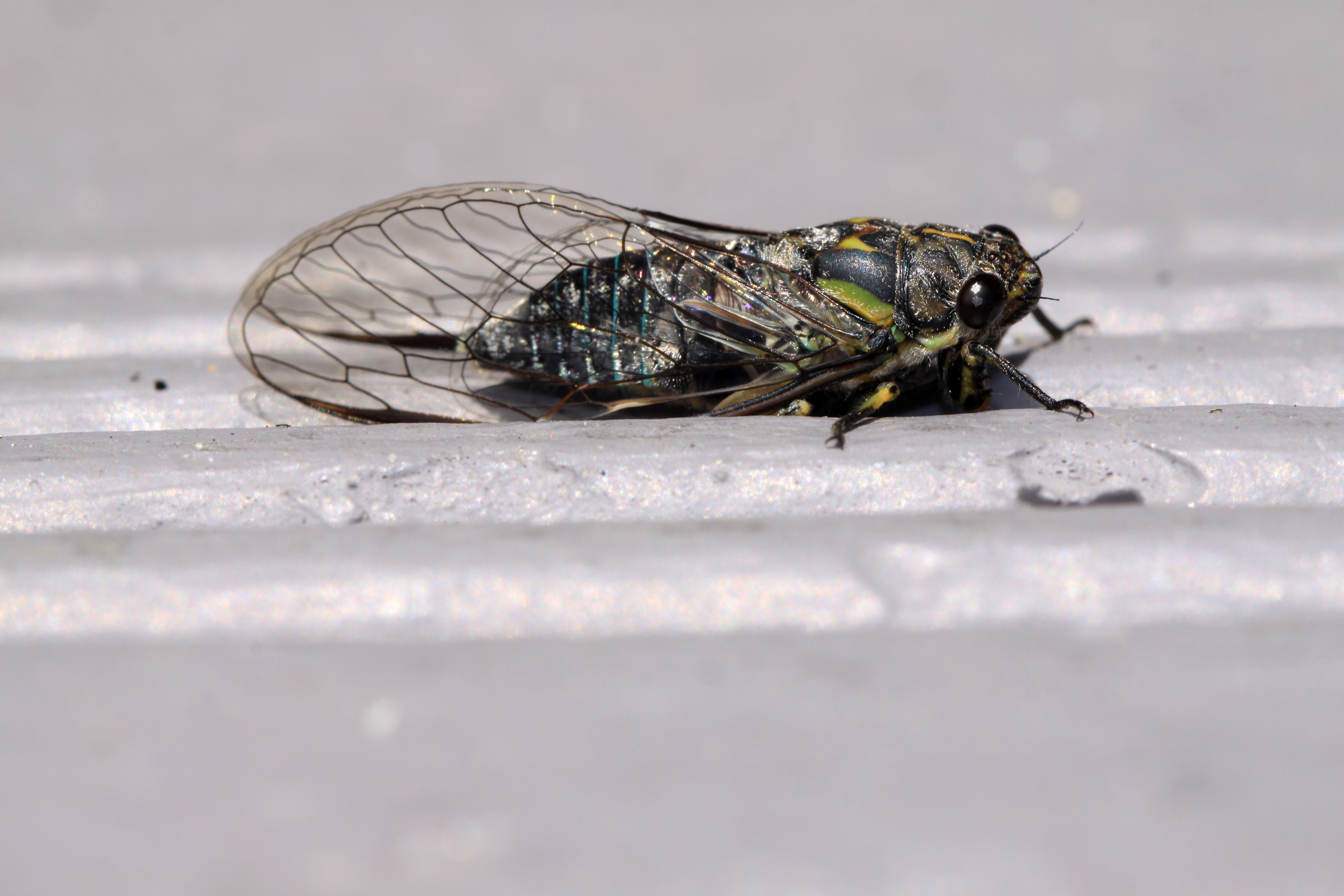
- Physeema quadricincta

Scientific classification
- Kingdom: Animalia
- Phylum: Arthropoda
- Clade: Pancrustacea
- Class: Insecta
- Order: Hemiptera
- Suborder: Auchenorrhyncha
- Infraorder: Cicadomorpha
- Superfamily: Cicadoidea
- Family: Cicadidae
- Subfamily: Cicadettinae
- Genus: Physeema; Moulds, 2012

= Physeema =

Genus of cicadas

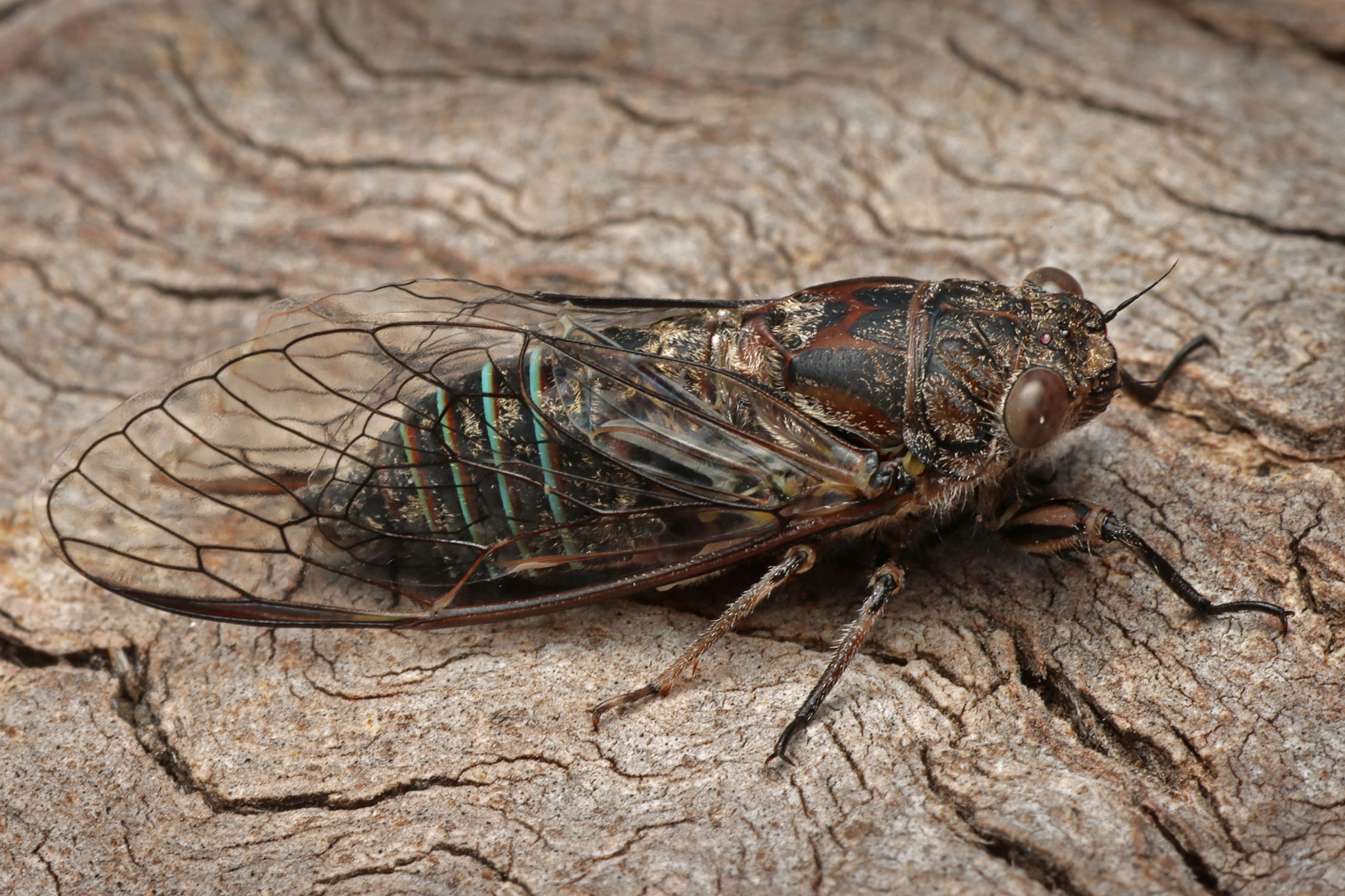
Physeema labyrinthica, Adelaide, Australia

Physeema is a genus of cicadas, mostly known as tickers, in the family Cicadidae, subfamily Cicadettinae and tribe Cicadettini. It is endemic to Australia. It was described in 2012 by Australian entomologist Maxwell Sydney Moulds.

== Etymology ==
The genus name Physeema is derived from Greek physema (a ‘bubble’ or ‘something inflated’) with reference to the swelling at the base of the male operculum.

== Species ==
As of 2025 there were five described species in the genus:

- Physeema bellatrix (Ashton, 1914) (Esperance Ticker)
- Physeema convergens (Walker, 1850) (Duke)
- Physeema labyrinthica (Walker, 1850) (Southern Coastal Ticker, Dune Ticker)
- Physeema latorea (Walker, 1850) (Northern Sandplain Ticker)
- Physeema quadricincta (Walker, 1850) (Tick-tock)
