= Kobonga fuscomarginata =

Scientific classification
- Kingdom: Animalia
- Phylum: Arthropoda
- Clade: Pancrustacea
- Class: Insecta
- Order: Hemiptera
- Suborder: Auchenorrhyncha
- Family: Cicadidae
- Genus: Kobonga
- Species: K. fuscomarginata

Binomial name
- Kobonga fuscomarginata (Distant, 1914)

Synonyms
- Pauropsalta fuscomarginata Distant, 1914

Species of cicada

Kobonga fuscomarginata is a species of cicada, also known as the slow dinger, in the true cicada family, Cicadettinae subfamily and Cicadettini tribe. It is endemic to Australia. It was described in 1914 by English entomologist William Lucas Distant.

== Description ==
The length of the forewing is 19–26 mm.

== Distribution and habitat ==
The species occurs from Diamantina National Park southwards through southern Queensland and inland New South Wales to Mildura in north-western Victoria. Its associated habitat is box eucalypt woodland and sparse semi-arid shrubland.

== Behaviour ==
Adult males are heard from October to February, sitting on the upper branches of trees and shrubs, uttering repetitive sequences of zeeps, followed by slow cling-cling-cling-cling calls.
