= Lembeja vitticollis =

Scientific classification
- Kingdom: Animalia
- Phylum: Arthropoda
- Clade: Pancrustacea
- Class: Insecta
- Order: Hemiptera
- Suborder: Auchenorrhyncha
- Family: Cicadidae
- Genus: Lembeja
- Species: L. vitticollis

Binomial name
- Lembeja vitticollis (Ashton, 1912)

Synonyms
- Prasia vitticollis Ashton, 1912

Species of cicada

Lembeja vitticollis is a species of cicada, also known as the brown leaf cicada, in the true cicada family, Cicadettinae subfamily and Pictilini tribe. The species is endemic to Australia. It was described in 1912 by Australian entomologist Julian Howard Ashton.

== Etymology ==
The specific epithet vitticollis, from Latin (“banded neck”), refers to the species’ appearance.

== Description ==
The length of the forewing is 34–43 mm.

== Distribution and habitat ==
The species occurs in north-eastern Queensland from Cooktown southwards to Cardwell. The associated habitat is tropical rainforest.

== Behaviour ==
Adult males may be heard from October to April, inhabiting the forest canopy, emitting whistling calls at dusk.
