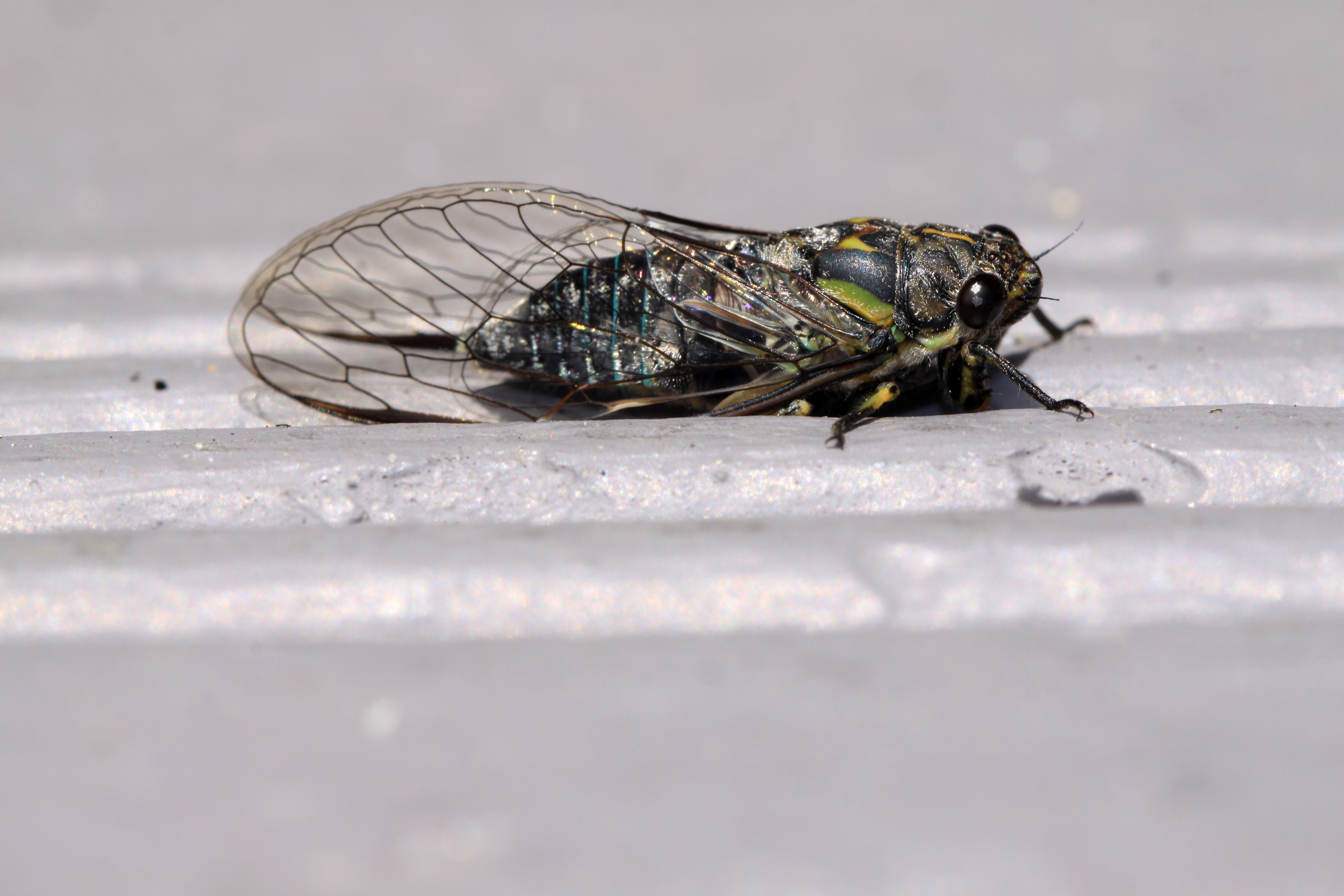

Scientific classification
- Kingdom: Animalia
- Phylum: Arthropoda
- Clade: Pancrustacea
- Class: Insecta
- Order: Hemiptera
- Suborder: Auchenorrhyncha
- Family: Cicadidae
- Genus: Physeema
- Species: P. quadricincta

Binomial name
- Physeema quadricincta (Walker, 1850)

Synonyms
- Cicada quadricincta Walker, 1850; Cicada telxiope Walker, 1850; Cicada duplex Walker, 1850; Cicadetta quadricincta (Walker, 1850); Melampsalta viridicincta Ashton, 1912

= Physeema quadricincta =

Species of cicada

Physeema quadricincta is a species of cicada, also known as the tick-tock, in the true cicada family, Cicadettinae subfamily and Cicadettini tribe. The species is endemic to Australia. It was described in 1850 by English entomologist Francis Walker.

== Description ==
The length of the forewing is 14–19 mm.

== Distribution and habitat ==
The species occurs in southern Western Australia from Kalbarri southwards to Augusta and Dongara, then eastwards to Cape Riche, with an isolated population at Kalgoorlie. Associated habitats include coastal dune vegetation, open heathland, gardens, roadsides and low grassy woodland.

== Behaviour ==
Adult males may be heard from September to February, clinging to the stems of grasses and shrubs, emitting clicking calls.
