= Gudanga pterolongata =

Scientific classification
- Kingdom: Animalia
- Phylum: Arthropoda
- Clade: Pancrustacea
- Class: Insecta
- Order: Hemiptera
- Suborder: Auchenorrhyncha
- Family: Cicadidae
- Genus: Gudanga
- Species: G. pterolongata

Binomial name
- Gudanga pterolongata Olive, 2007

Species of cicada

Gudanga pterolongata is a species of cicada, also known as the Croydon blackwing, in the true cicada family, Cicadettinae subfamily and Cicadettini tribe. It is endemic to Australia. It was described in 2007 by entomologist John C. Olive.

== Description ==
The length of the forewing is 17–21 mm.

== Distribution and habitat ==
The species occurs in a small area between Georgetown and Croydon in North Queensland, in the Gulf Plains bioregion. Its associated habitat is open woodland with lancewood.

== Behaviour ==
Adults appear from January to February, clinging to the trunks and upper branches of lancewood trees, uttering calls characterised by a series of double chirps interspersed by long buzzes.
