= Popplepsalta granitica =

Scientific classification
- Kingdom: Animalia
- Phylum: Arthropoda
- Clade: Pancrustacea
- Class: Insecta
- Order: Hemiptera
- Suborder: Auchenorrhyncha
- Family: Cicadidae
- Genus: Popplepsalta
- Species: P. granitica

Binomial name
- Popplepsalta granitica (Popple, 2013)

Synonyms
- Pauropsalta granitica Popple, 2013

Species of cicada

Popplepsalta granitica is a species of cicada, also known as the northern red-eyed squeaker, in the true cicada family, Cicadettinae subfamily and Cicadettini tribe. The species is endemic to Australia. It was described in 2013 by Australian entomologist Lindsay Popple.

== Description ==
The length of the forewing is 12–16 mm.

== Distribution and habitat ==
The species occurs across northern Australia, from the eastern Kimberley region of Western Australia eastwards through the Northern Territory to Mount Garnet, then north to the Palmer River in Far North Queensland. The associated habitat is dry eucalypt woodland.

== Behaviour ==
Adult males may be heard from November to January, clinging to the upper branches of eucalypts, including granite ironbarks and Wandi ironbarks, emitting calls characterised by rapidly alternating long and short chirps.
