= Imbabura =

Imbabura may refer to:

- Imbabura Province, Ecuador
- Imbabura Volcano, Ecuador
- Imbabura Sporting Club, a professional football club based in Ibarra, Ecuador
- Imbabura (cicada), a genus of cicadas
