= Kobonga apicans =

Scientific classification
- Kingdom: Animalia
- Phylum: Arthropoda
- Clade: Pancrustacea
- Class: Insecta
- Order: Hemiptera
- Suborder: Auchenorrhyncha
- Family: Cicadidae
- Genus: Kobonga
- Species: K. apicans

Binomial name
- Kobonga apicans Moulds & Kopestonsky, 2001

Species of cicada

Kobonga apicans is a species of cicada, also known as the northern robust clicker, in the true cicada family, Cicadettinae subfamily and Cicadettini tribe. It is endemic to Australia. It was described in 2001 by entomologists Maxwell Sydney Moulds and K.A. Kopestonsky.

== Etymology ==
The specific epithet is derived from Latin apricatio (‘basking in the sun’) with reference to the species’ apparent liking for the sun and a hot climate.

== Description ==
The length of the forewing is 29–37 mm.

== Distribution and habitat ==
The species occurs in much of the southern three-quarters of the Northern Territory, extending eastwards to Urandangi in western Queensland and southwards to the Musgrave Ranges in northern South Australia, as well as to inland southern Western Australia as far west as Coolgardie and Bolgart. Its associated habitat is acacia shrubland.

== Behaviour ==
Adult males are heard from December to April, clinging to the stems and upper branches of acacias, uttering thin buzzing calls which commence with metallic clicks.
