= Kobonga =

Scientific classification
- Kingdom: Animalia
- Phylum: Arthropoda
- Clade: Pancrustacea
- Class: Insecta
- Order: Hemiptera
- Suborder: Auchenorrhyncha
- Infraorder: Cicadomorpha
- Superfamily: Cicadoidea
- Family: Cicadidae
- Subfamily: Cicadettinae
- Genus: Kobonga; Distant, 1906

Genus of cicadas

Kobonga is a genus of cicadas, also known as dingers or clickers, in the family Cicadidae, subfamily Cicadettinae and tribe Cicadettini. It is endemic to Australia. It was described in 1906 by English entomologist William Lucas Distant.

== Species ==
As of 2025 there were seven described species in the genus:

- Kobonga apicans Moulds and Kopestonsky, 2001 (Northern Robust Clicker)
- Kobonga apicata (Ashton, 1914) (Western Clicker)
- Kobonga froggatti Distant, 1913 (Maroon Clicker )
- Kobonga fuscomarginata (Distant, 1914) (Slow Dinger)
- Kobonga godingi (Distant, 1905) (Southern Robust Clicker)
- Kobonga oxleyi (Distant, 1882) (Moree Dinger)
- Kobonga umbrimargo (Walker, 1858) (Orange Clicker)
