= Popplepsalta kobongoides =

Scientific classification
- Kingdom: Animalia
- Phylum: Arthropoda
- Clade: Pancrustacea
- Class: Insecta
- Order: Hemiptera
- Suborder: Auchenorrhyncha
- Family: Cicadidae
- Genus: Popplepsalta
- Species: P. kobongoides

Binomial name
- Popplepsalta kobongoides (Popple, 2013)

Synonyms
- Pauropsalta kobongoides Popple, 2013

Species of cicada

Popplepsalta kobongoides is a species of cicada, also known as the mimic squeaker, in the true cicada family, Cicadettinae subfamily and Cicadettini tribe. The species is endemic to Australia. It was described in 2013 by Australian entomologist Lindsay Popple.

== Description ==
The length of the forewing is 15–18 mm.

== Distribution and habitat ==
The species occurs in temperate areas of inland eastern Australia, west of the Great Dividing Range, from Augathella in Queensland southwards to Wagga Wagga in New South Wales. Associated habitats include box and ironbark eucalypts, as well as sally wattle, growing on river flats in loamy soils.

== Behaviour ==
Adult males may be heard from October to January, clinging to the upper branches and foliage of trees, emitting complex rattling and whining calls.
