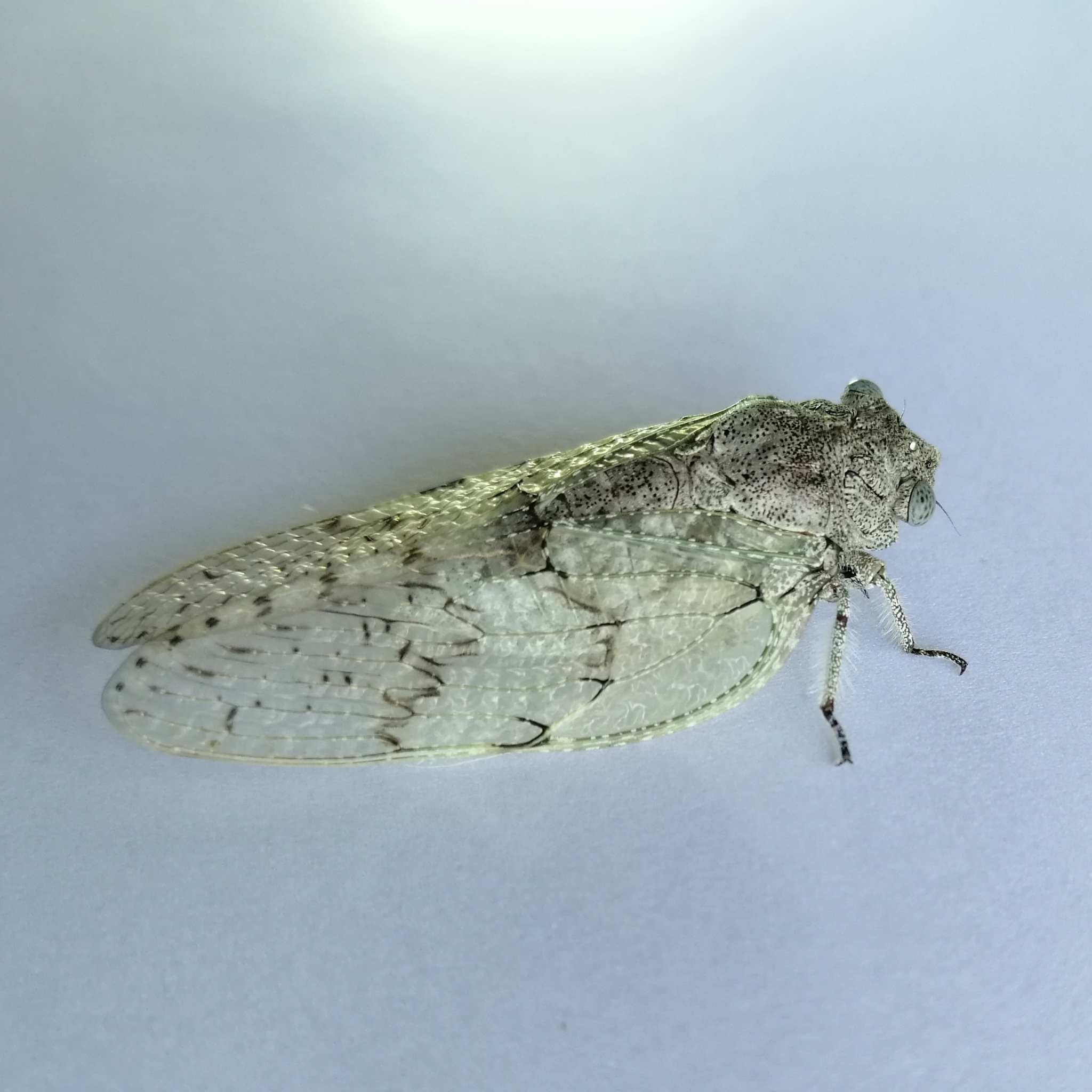
- Nosola paradoxa

Scientific classification
- Kingdom: Animalia
- Phylum: Arthropoda
- Clade: Pancrustacea
- Class: Insecta
- Order: Hemiptera
- Suborder: Auchenorrhyncha
- Superfamily: Cicadoidea
- Family: Cicadidae
- Subfamily: Cicadettinae
- Tribe: Taphurini; Distant, 1905

= Taphurini =

Tribe of true bugs

Taphurini is a tribe of cicadas in the family Cicadidae, found in the neotropics.

== Genera ==
These genera belong to the tribe Taphurini:

- Anopercalna Boulard, 2008^{c g}
- Chalumalna Boulard, 1998^{i c g}
- Dorachosa Distant, 1892^{i c g}
- Dulderana Distant, 1905^{i c g}
- Elachysoma Torres, 1964^{i c g}
- Imbabura Distant, 1911^{i c g}
- Malloryalna Sanborn, 2016^{c g}
- Nosola Stål, 1866^{i c g}
- Prosotettix Jacobi, 1907^{i c g}
- Psallodia Uhler, 1903^{i c g}
- Taphura Stål, 1862^{i c g}

Data sources: i = ITIS, c = Catalogue of Life, g = GBIF, b = Bugguide.net
