= Kobonga umbrimargo =

Scientific classification
- Kingdom: Animalia
- Phylum: Arthropoda
- Clade: Pancrustacea
- Class: Insecta
- Order: Hemiptera
- Suborder: Auchenorrhyncha
- Family: Cicadidae
- Genus: Kobonga
- Species: K. umbrimargo

Binomial name
- Kobonga umbrimargo (Walker, 1858)

Synonyms
- Cicada umbrimargo Walker, 1858

Species of cicada

Kobonga umbrimargo is a species or species complex of cicadas, also known as orange clickers, in the true cicada family, Cicadettinae subfamily and Cicadettini tribe. It is endemic to Australia. It was described in 1858 by English entomologist Francis Walker.

== Description ==
The length of the forewing is 29–39 mm.

== Distribution and habitat ==
The species complex occurs over large areas of semi-arid Australia, including parts of all mainland states. Its associated habitats include closed heath, mallee woodland and acacia shrubland.

== Behaviour ==
Adult males cling to the upper branches of mallee eucalypts and acacias, uttering complex buzzing and clicking calls.
