= Popplepsalta annulata =

Scientific classification
- Kingdom: Animalia
- Phylum: Arthropoda
- Clade: Pancrustacea
- Class: Insecta
- Order: Hemiptera
- Suborder: Auchenorrhyncha
- Family: Cicadidae
- Genus: Popplepsalta
- Species: P. annulata

Binomial name
- Popplepsalta annulata (Goding & Froggatt, 1904)

Synonyms
- Pauropsalta annulata Goding & Froggatt, 1904

Species of cicada

Popplepsalta annulata is a species of cicada, also known as the sprinkler squeaker, in the true cicada family, Cicadettinae subfamily and Cicadettini tribe. The species is endemic to Australia. It was described in 1904 by entomologists Frederic Webster Goding and Walter Wilson Froggatt.

== Description ==
The length of the forewing is 15–18 mm.

== Distribution and habitat ==
The species occurs from the Whitsunday Region southwards through south-eastern Queensland into north-eastern New South Wales. Associated habitats include dry sclerophyll forest, tall open forest and heathland, as well as parks and gardens.

== Behaviour ==
Adult males may be heard from September to March, clinging to the outer foliage of trees and shrubs, emitting rapidly alternating, chirping and buzzing calls, a sound likened to that of a small sprinkler system.
