= Physeema bellatrix =

Scientific classification
- Kingdom: Animalia
- Phylum: Arthropoda
- Clade: Pancrustacea
- Class: Insecta
- Order: Hemiptera
- Suborder: Auchenorrhyncha
- Family: Cicadidae
- Genus: Physeema
- Species: P. bellatrix

Binomial name
- Physeema bellatrix (Ashton, 1914)

Synonyms
- Pauropsalta bellatrix Ashton, 1914

Species of cicada

Physeema bellatrix is a species of cicada, also known as the Esperance ticker, in the true cicada family, Cicadettinae subfamily and Cicadettini tribe. The species is endemic to Australia. It was described in 1914 by Australian entomologist Julian Howard Ashton.

== Description ==
The length of the forewing is 15–17 mm.

== Distribution and habitat ==
The species occurs in southern Western Australia from Warren River eastwards to Esperance. The associated habitat is heath on sandplains.

== Behaviour ==
Adult males may be heard from October to February, clinging to the stems of shrubs, emitting soft, slow, clicking calls.
