= Palapsalta palaga =

Scientific classification
- Kingdom: Animalia
- Phylum: Arthropoda
- Clade: Pancrustacea
- Class: Insecta
- Order: Hemiptera
- Suborder: Auchenorrhyncha
- Family: Cicadidae
- Genus: Palapsalta
- Species: P. palaga

Binomial name
- Palapsalta palaga Owen & Moulds, 2016

Species of cicada

Palapsalta palaga is a species of cicada, also known as the northern river tree-buzzer, in the true cicada family, Cicadettinae subfamily and Cicadettini tribe. It is endemic to Australia. It was described in 2016 by entomologists Christopher Owen and Maxwell Sydney Moulds.

== Etymology ==
The specific epithet palaga (Latin: ‘gold ingot’) refers to the yellow colouration of the cicadas.

== Description ==
The length of the forewing is 18–24 mm.

== Distribution and habitat ==
The species occurs from north of Alice Springs, in the Northern Territory, eastwards to Georgetown in north Queensland. The associated habitat is riverine eucalypt woodland.

== Behaviour ==
Adult males may be heard from December to February, clinging to the upper branches of eucalypts, emitting fluttering songs in short bursts.
