= Popplepsalta subtropica =

Scientific classification
- Kingdom: Animalia
- Phylum: Arthropoda
- Clade: Pancrustacea
- Class: Insecta
- Order: Hemiptera
- Suborder: Auchenorrhyncha
- Family: Cicadidae
- Genus: Popplepsalta
- Species: P. subtropica

Binomial name
- Popplepsalta subtropica (Popple, 2013)

Synonyms
- Pauropsalta subtropica Popple, 2013

Species of cicada

Popplepsalta subtropica is a species of cicada, also known as the subtropical red-eyed squeaker, in the true cicada family, Cicadettinae subfamily and Cicadettini tribe. The species is endemic to Australia. It was described in 2013 by Australian entomologist Lindsay Popple.

== Description ==
The length of the forewing is 15–18 mm.

== Distribution and habitat ==
The species occurs in subtropical eastern Queensland, from the Hervey Range southwards to Mundubbera. The associated habitat is sclerophyll forest and woodland, with ironbark and box eucalypts, on sandy soils.

== Behaviour ==
Adult males may be heard in November and December, clinging to the upper branches and foliage of eucalypts, emitting rapid, maraca-like, chirping calls.
