= Popplepsalta rubristrigata =

Scientific classification
- Kingdom: Animalia
- Phylum: Arthropoda
- Clade: Pancrustacea
- Class: Insecta
- Order: Hemiptera
- Suborder: Auchenorrhyncha
- Family: Cicadidae
- Genus: Popplepsalta
- Species: P. rubristrigata

Binomial name
- Popplepsalta rubristrigata (Goding & Froggatt, 1904)

Synonyms
- Melampsalta rubristrigata Goding & Froggatt, 1904

Species of cicada

Popplepsalta rubristrigata is a species of cicada, also known as the red scratcher, in the true cicada family, Cicadettinae subfamily and Cicadettini tribe. The species is endemic to Australia. It was described in 1904 by entomologists Frederic Webster Goding and Walter Wilson Froggatt.

== Description ==
The length of the forewing is 26–28 mm.

== Distribution and habitat ==
The species has a cool temperate climate range from Mudgee in New South Wales southwards along the Great Dividing Range into Victoria and then westwards to Adelaide and Kangaroo Island in South Australia. The associated habitat is open eucalypt forest, often near watercourses.

== Behaviour ==
Adult males may be heard from November to February, clinging to the larger branches of eucalypts, emitting low-frequency calls.
