= Kobonga apicata =

Scientific classification
- Kingdom: Animalia
- Phylum: Arthropoda
- Clade: Pancrustacea
- Class: Insecta
- Order: Hemiptera
- Suborder: Auchenorrhyncha
- Family: Cicadidae
- Genus: Kobonga
- Species: K. apicata

Binomial name
- Kobonga apicata (Ashton, 1914)

Synonyms
- Melampsalta apicata Ashton, 1914

Species of cicada

Kobonga apicata is a species of cicada, also known as the western clicker, in the true cicada family, Cicadettinae subfamily and Cicadettini tribe. It is endemic to Australia. It was described in 1914 by Australian entomologist Julian Howard Ashton.

== Description ==
The length of the forewing is 22–30 mm.

== Distribution and habitat ==
The species occurs in the southern part of the Northern Territory, as well as in central-western Western Australia from Mount Magnet to Tom Price. Its associated habitat is acacia shrubland.

== Behaviour ==
Adult males are heard from December to February, clinging to the main trunks and branches of acacias, as well as on other trees and shrubs, uttering buzzing and clicking calls.
