= Gudanga kalgoorliensis =

Scientific classification
- Kingdom: Animalia
- Phylum: Arthropoda
- Clade: Pancrustacea
- Class: Insecta
- Order: Hemiptera
- Suborder: Auchenorrhyncha
- Family: Cicadidae
- Genus: Gudanga
- Species: G. kalgoorliensis

Binomial name
- Gudanga kalgoorliensis Moulds, 1996

Species of cicada

Gudanga kalgoorliensis is a species of cicada, also known as the Kalgoorlie blackwing, in the true cicada family, Cicadettinae subfamily and Cicadettini tribe. It is endemic to Australia. It was described in 1996 by Australian entomologist Maxwell Sydney Moulds.

== Etymology ==
The specific epithet kalgoorliensis refers to the gold mining city of Kalgoorlie.

== Description ==
The length of the forewing is 15–21 mm.

== Distribution and habitat ==
The species is only known from the vicinity of Kalgoorlie in the Goldfields–Esperance region of southern Western Australia. Its associated habitat is mallee woodland.

== Behaviour ==
Adults have been heard in January, uttering calls composed of phrases of four inflected chirps.
