= Popplepsalta ayrensis =

Scientific classification
- Kingdom: Animalia
- Phylum: Arthropoda
- Clade: Pancrustacea
- Class: Insecta
- Order: Hemiptera
- Suborder: Auchenorrhyncha
- Family: Cicadidae
- Genus: Popplepsalta
- Species: P. ayrensis

Binomial name
- Popplepsalta ayrensis (Ewart, 1989)

Synonyms
- Pauropsalta ayrensis Ewart, 1989

Species of cicada

Popplepsalta ayrensis is a species of cicada, also known as the ephemeral squeaker, in the true cicada family, Cicadettinae subfamily and Cicadettini tribe. The species is endemic to Australia. It was described in 1989 by Australian entomologist Anthony Ewart.

== Description ==
The length of the forewing is 15–18 mm.

== Distribution and habitat ==
The species occurs in eastern Queensland from Cooktown southwards, mainly along the eastern side of the Great Dividing Range, almost as far as the state border with New South Wales. Associated habitats are tropical and subtropical, including low open forest and grassland, usually near water, as well as rural communities.

== Behaviour ==
Adult males may be heard from October to January, clinging to eucalypts, she-oaks, grass stems and fenceposts, emitting coarse, soft di-derrr-didi-derrr-di-derrr calls during sunny conditions.
