= Plerapsalta multifascia =

Scientific classification
- Kingdom: Animalia
- Phylum: Arthropoda
- Clade: Pancrustacea
- Class: Insecta
- Order: Hemiptera
- Suborder: Auchenorrhyncha
- Family: Cicadidae
- Genus: Plerapsalta
- Species: P. multifascia

Binomial name
- Plerapsalta multifascia (Walker, 1850)

Synonyms
- Cicada multifascia Walker, 1850; Cicada obscurior Walker, 1850; Cicada singula Walker, 1850

Species of cicada

Plerapsalta multifascia is a species of cicada, also known as the neon ambertail, in the true cicada family, Cicadettinae subfamily and Cicadettini tribe. The species is endemic to Australia. It was described in 1850 by English entomologist Francis Walker.

== Description ==
The length of the forewing is 13–14 mm.

== Distribution and habitat ==
The species occurs from south-eastern Queensland southwards to the vicinity of Sydney in New South Wales, as well as from Adelaide in South Australia. Associated habitats include open forest, woodland, and grassland on poor soil, especially near water.

== Behaviour ==
Adult males may be heard from September to December, clinging to grass and shrub stems as well as the trunks and upper branches of trees, emitting high-frequency, lilting calls.
