= Palapsalta belli =

Scientific classification
- Kingdom: Animalia
- Phylum: Arthropoda
- Clade: Pancrustacea
- Class: Insecta
- Order: Hemiptera
- Suborder: Auchenorrhyncha
- Family: Cicadidae
- Genus: Palapsalta
- Species: P. belli

Binomial name
- Palapsalta belli Emery, Emery & Hutchinson 2018

Species of cicada

Palapsalta belli is a species of cicada, also known as the Pilbara tree-buzzer, in the true cicada family, Cicadettinae subfamily and Cicadettini tribe. It is endemic to Australia. It was described in 2018 by Australian entomologists David L. Emery, Nathan J. Emery and Paul M. Hutchinson.

== Etymology ==
The specific epithet belli honours William Bell, who captured specimens at Exmouth.

== Description ==
The length of the forewing is 17–22 mm.

== Distribution and habitat ==
The species occurs in the Pilbara and Gascoyne regions of central Western Australia. The associated habitat is riverine eucalypt woodland.

== Behaviour ==
Adult males may be heard from November to March, clinging to the upper branches of eucalypts, uttering songs characterised by sweeping notes followed by a sequence of chirps.
