= Popplepsalta =

Scientific classification
- Kingdom: Animalia
- Phylum: Arthropoda
- Clade: Pancrustacea
- Class: Insecta
- Order: Hemiptera
- Suborder: Auchenorrhyncha
- Infraorder: Cicadomorpha
- Superfamily: Cicadoidea
- Family: Cicadidae
- Subfamily: Cicadettinae
- Genus: Popplepsalta; Owen & Moulds, 2016

Genus of cicadas

Popplepsalta is a genus of cicadas, also known as squeakers or scratchers, in the family Cicadidae, subfamily Cicadettinae and tribe Cicadettini. It is endemic to Australia. It was described in 2016 by entomologists Christopher Owen and Maxwell Sydney Moulds.

== Etymology ==
The genus name Popplepsalta is a combination that honours entomologist Lindsay Popple for his contributions to the taxonomy and knowledge of Australian cicadas, with psalta, a traditional suffix used in the generic names of many cicada species.

== Species ==
As of 2025 there were 15 described species in the genus:

- Popplepsalta aeroides Owen and Moulds, 2016 (Blue-banded Scratcher)
- Popplepsalta annulata (Goding and Froggatt, 1904) (Sprinkler Squeaker)
- Popplepsalta ayrensis (Ewart, 1989) (Ephemeral Squeaker)
- Popplepsalta blackdownensis (Popple, 2013) (Blackdown Squeaker)
- Popplepsalta corymbiae (Popple, 2013) (Western Red-eyed Squeaker)
- Popplepsalta decora (Popple, 2013) (Static Squeaker)
- Popplepsalta granitica (Popple, 2013) (Northern Red-eyed Squeaker)
- Popplepsalta inversa (Popple, 2013) (Retro Squeaker)
- Popplepsalta kobongoides (Popple, 2013) (Mimic Squeaker)
- Popplepsalta notialis (Popple, 2013)
  - Popplepsalta notialis notialis (Popple, 2013) (Southern Red-eyed Squeaker)
  - Popplepsalta notialis incitata (Popple, 2013) (Inland Sprinkler Squeaker)
- Popplepsalta rubristrigata (Goding and Froggatt, 1904) (Red Scratcher)
- Popplepsalta simplex (Popple, 2013) (Atherton Squeaker)
- Popplepsalta subtropica (Popple, 2013) (Subtropical Red-eyed Squeaker)
- Popplepsalta torrensis (Popple, 2013) (Hughenden Red-eyed Squeaker)
- Popplepsalta tremula (Popple, 2013) (Maraca Squeaker)
