= Calipsalta fumosa =

Scientific classification
- Kingdom: Animalia
- Phylum: Arthropoda
- Clade: Pancrustacea
- Class: Insecta
- Order: Hemiptera
- Suborder: Auchenorrhyncha
- Family: Cicadidae
- Genus: Calipsalta
- Species: C. fumosa

Binomial name
- Calipsalta fumosa Moulds & Marshall, 2022

Species of cicada

Calipsalta fumosa is a species of cicada, also known as the pale green spinifex rattler, in the true cicada family, Cicadettinae subfamily and Cicadettini tribe. It is endemic to Australia. It was described in 2022 by Australian entomologists Maxwell Sydney Moulds and David C. Marshall.

== Etymology ==
The species epithet fumosa is derived from Latin fumosus ('smoky'), with reference to the smoky markings on the sub-apical forewings.

== Description ==
The length of the forewing is 18–23 mm.

== Distribution and habitat ==
The species' range covers much of arid western central Australia, including parts of Western Australia, the Northern Territory and far north South Australia. The associated habitat is low, open shrubland with spinifex and other grasses.

== Behaviour ==
Adults may be heard from December to February, uttering coarse, buzzing calls during the day and at dusk.
