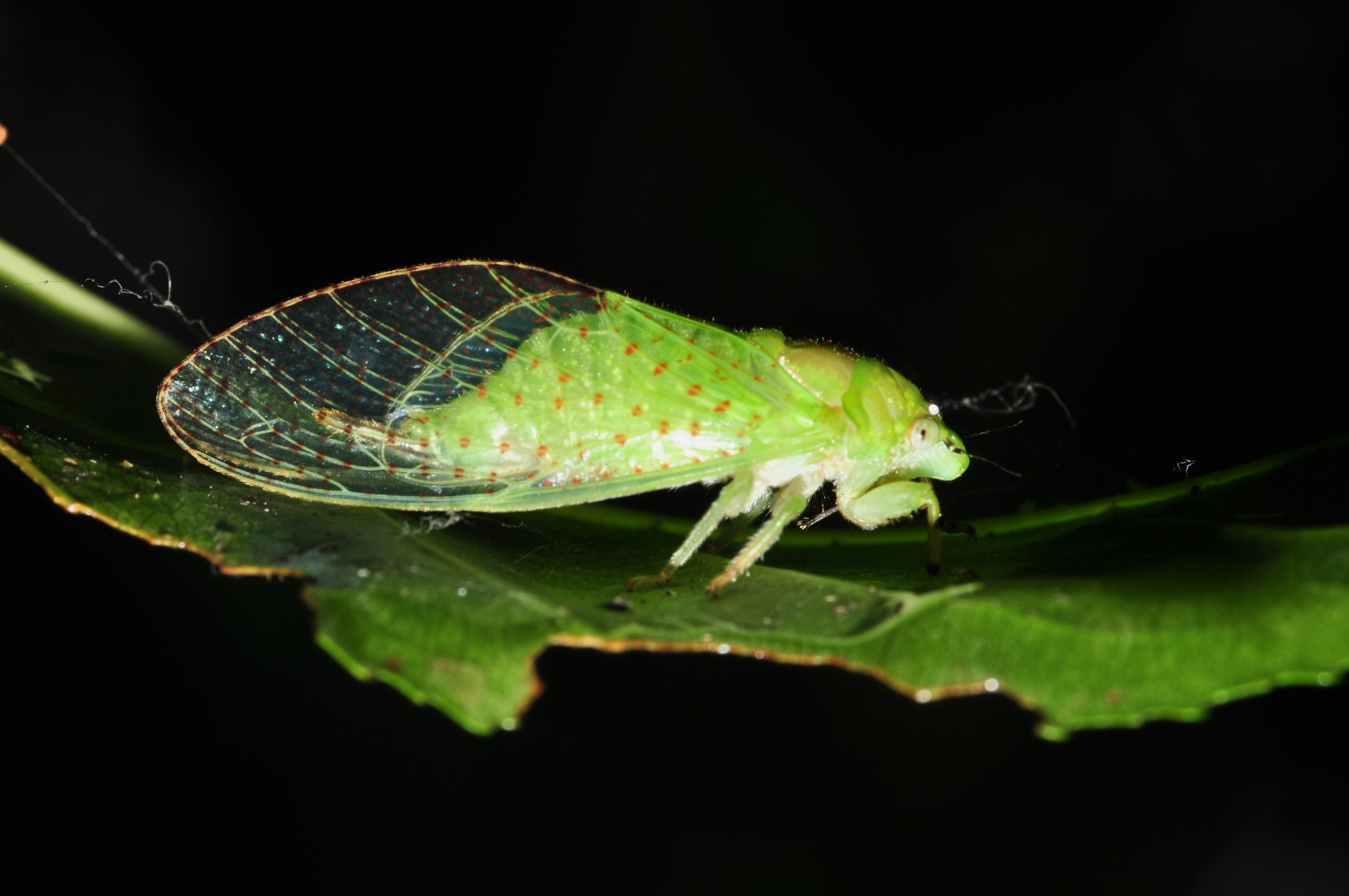
- Lembeja sp.

Scientific classification
- Kingdom: Animalia
- Phylum: Arthropoda
- Clade: Pancrustacea
- Class: Insecta
- Order: Hemiptera
- Suborder: Auchenorrhyncha
- Superfamily: Cicadoidea
- Family: Cicadidae
- Subfamily: Cicadettinae
- Tribe: Prasiini
- Genus: Lembeja; Distant, 1892

= Lembeja =

Genus of cicadas

Lembeja is a genus of cicadas, also known as leaf cicadas, in the family Cicadidae, subfamily Cicadettinae and tribe Prasiini. It is native to Southeast Asia and Australasia. It was described in 1892 by English entomologist William Lucas Distant.

== Species ==
As of 2025 there were 29 valid species in the genus:

- Lembeja brendelli Jong, 1986
- Lembeja consanguinea Jong, 1987
- Lembeja dekkeri Jong, 1986
- Lembeja distanti Jong, 1986
- Lembeja elongata Jong, 1986
- Lembeja fatiloqua (Stål, 1870)
- Lembeja foliata (Walker, 1858)
- Lembeja fruhstorferi Distant, 1897
- Lembeja gulfensis Sanborn, 2015
- Lembeja hollowayi Jong, 1986
- Lembeja incisa Jong, 1986
- Lembeja lieftincki Jong, 1987
- Lembeja maculosa (Distant, 1883)
- Lembeja majuscula Jong, 1986
- Lembeja minahassae Jong, 1986
- Lembeja mirandae Jong, 1986
- Lembeja oligorhanta Jong, 1986
- Lembeja papuensis Distant, 1897
- Lembeja paradoxa (Karsch, 1890)
- Lembeja parvula Jong, 1987
- Lembeja pectinulata Jong, 1986
- Lembeja robusta Distant, 1909
- Lembeja roehli Schmidt, 1925
- Lembeja sangihensis Jong, 1986
- Lembeja sanguinolenta Distant, 1909
- Lembeja sumbawensis Jong, 1987
- Lembeja tincta (Distant, 1909)
- Lembeja vitticollis (Ashton, 1912)
- Lembeja wallacei Jong, 1987
