= Popplepsalta notialis =

Scientific classification
- Kingdom: Animalia
- Phylum: Arthropoda
- Clade: Pancrustacea
- Class: Insecta
- Order: Hemiptera
- Suborder: Auchenorrhyncha
- Family: Cicadidae
- Genus: Popplepsalta
- Species: P. notialis

Binomial name
- Popplepsalta notialis (Popple, 2013)

Species of cicada

Popplepsalta notialis is a species of cicada in the true cicada family, Cicadettinae subfamily and Cicadettini tribe. The species is endemic to Australia. It was described in 2013 by Australian entomologist Lindsay Popple. There are two subspecies.

== Subspecies ==
Popplepsalta notialis notialis (Popple, 2013) is also known as the southern red-eyed squeaker.

=== Description ===
The length of the forewing is 13–17 mm.

=== Distribution and habitat ===
P. n. notialis occurs from Mount Moffatt in Central Queensland southwards through South East Queensland to Gerroa on the south coast of New South Wales. Associated habitats include eucalypt woodland and open forest, as well as urban parks and gardens in Sydney.

=== Behaviour ===
Adult males may be heard from September to February, while clinging to the foliage and upper branches of trees and shrubs, emitting buzzing and chirping calls.

Popplepsalta notialis incitata (Popple, 2013) is also known as the inland sprinkler squeaker.

=== Description ===
The length of the forewing is 14–16 mm.

=== Distribution and habitat ===
P. n. incitata occurs in the Brigalow Belt of inland eastern Australia, from Mazeppa National Park in central Queensland southwards to Narrabri in north-central New South Wales. There are also disjunct populations in the Australian Capital Territory and Victoria. Associated habitats include brigalow scrub, eucalypt woodland, open shrubland, mulga scrub and rural gardens.

=== Behaviour ===
Adult males may be heard while clinging to the foliage and upper branches of trees and shrubs, emitting buzzing and chirping calls.
