= Palapsalta virgulata =

Scientific classification
- Kingdom: Animalia
- Phylum: Arthropoda
- Clade: Pancrustacea
- Class: Insecta
- Order: Hemiptera
- Suborder: Auchenorrhyncha
- Family: Cicadidae
- Genus: Palapsalta
- Species: P. virgulata

Binomial name
- Palapsalta virgulata (Ewart, 1989)

Synonyms
- Pauropsalta virgulatus Ewart, 1989

Species of cicada

Palapsalta virgulata is a species, or species complex, of cicadas, also known as striped tree-buzzers, in the true cicada family, Cicadettinae subfamily and Cicadettini tribe. It is endemic to Australia. It was described in 1989 by Australian entomologist Anthony Ewart.

== Etymology ==
The specific epithet virgulata is derived from Latin virgulatus (striped), with reference to body patterning.

== Description ==
The length of the forewing is 17–22 mm.

== Distribution and habitat ==
The species complex occurs in north-eastern Queensland, from Mount Carbine southwards to Mount Garnet and the Paluma Range, with other populations near Glenden and the Blackdown Tableland. Associated habitats include eucalypt woodland, open forest and eucalypts on the margins of rainforest.

== Behaviour ==
Adult males may be heard from November to April, clinging to the trunks and upper branches of eucalypts, uttering chirping and buzzing calls.
