= Physeema latorea =

Scientific classification
- Kingdom: Animalia
- Phylum: Arthropoda
- Clade: Pancrustacea
- Class: Insecta
- Order: Hemiptera
- Suborder: Auchenorrhyncha
- Family: Cicadidae
- Genus: Physeema
- Species: P. latorea

Binomial name
- Physeema latorea (Walker, 1850)

Synonyms
- Cicada latorea Walker, 1850; Cicadetta latorea (Walker, 1850)

Species of cicada

Physeema latorea is a species of cicada, also known as the northern sandplain ticker, in the true cicada family, Cicadettinae subfamily and Cicadettini tribe. The species is endemic to Australia. It was described in 1850 by English entomologist Francis Walker.

== Description ==
The length of the forewing is 15–17 mm.

== Distribution and habitat ==
The species occurs in coastal Western Australia from Kalbarri southwards to Augusta, then eastwards to Albany. Associated habitats include grassland, shrubland and heath.

== Behaviour ==
Adult males may be heard from October to January, clinging to the stems of grasses and shrubs, emitting moderately-paced, clicking calls.
