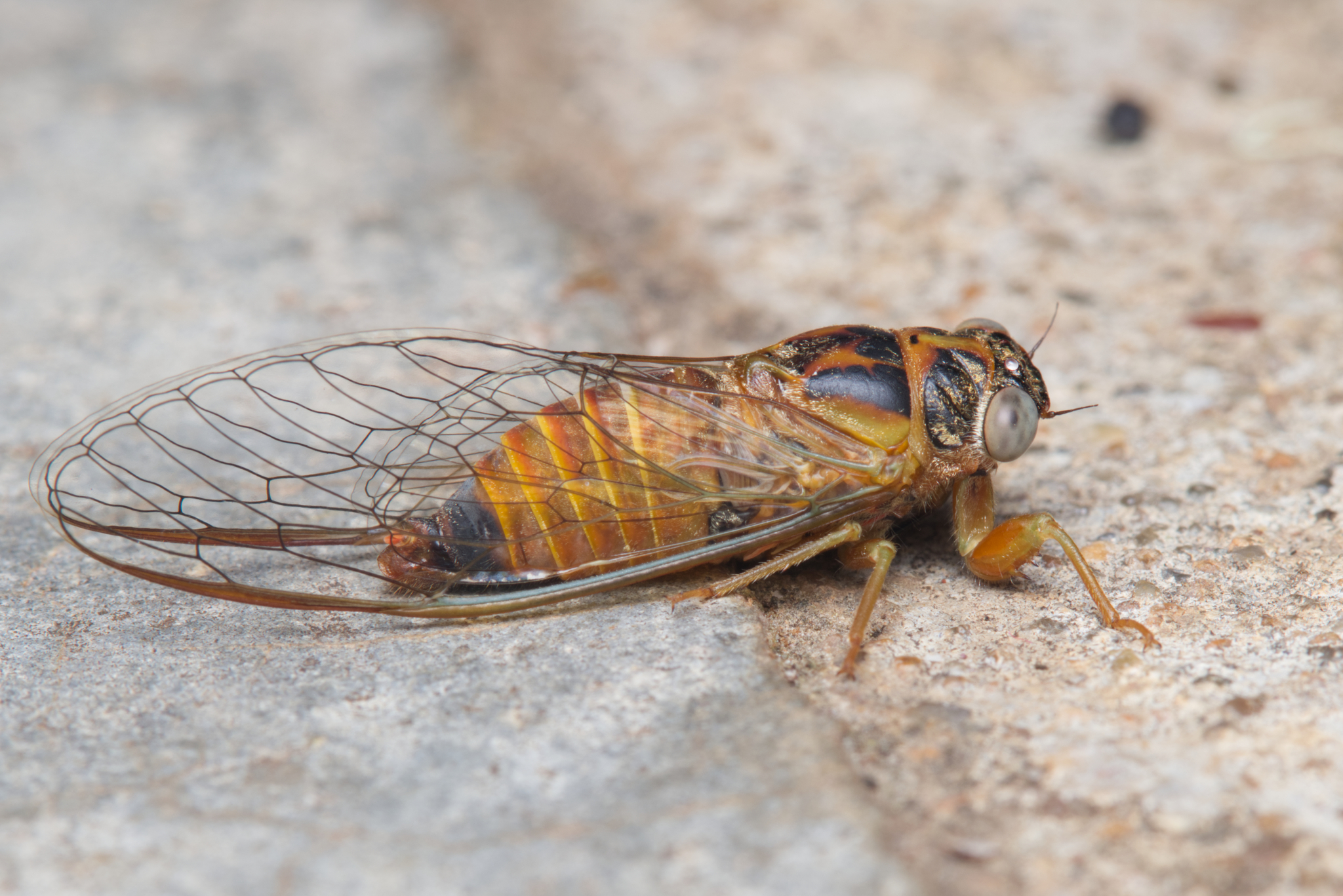
- Palapsalta eyrei

Scientific classification
- Kingdom: Animalia
- Phylum: Arthropoda
- Clade: Pancrustacea
- Class: Insecta
- Order: Hemiptera
- Suborder: Auchenorrhyncha
- Infraorder: Cicadomorpha
- Superfamily: Cicadoidea
- Family: Cicadidae
- Subfamily: Cicadettinae
- Genus: Palapsalta; Moulds, 2012

= Palapsalta =

Genus of cicadas

Palapsalta is a genus of cicadas, mostly known as tree-buzzers, in the family Cicadidae, subfamily Cicadettinae and tribe Cicadettini. It was described in 2012 by Australian entomologist Maxwell Sydney Moulds.

== Etymology ==
The genus name Palapsalta is a combination derived from Latin pala (‘palette’), with reference to the palette-like upper pygofer lobes of the male genitalia, and psalta (from Latin psaltria – a female harpist), which is a suffix traditionally used in the generic names of cicadas.

== Species ==
As of 2025 there were eight described species in the genus:

- Palapsalta belli Emery, Emery and Hutchinson, 2018 (Pilbara Tree-buzzer)
- Palapsalta circumdata (Walker, 1852) (Bronze Tree-buzzer)
- Palapsalta eyrei (Distant, 1882) (Yellow Tree-buzzer)
- Palapsalta ligneocauda Emery, Emery and Hutchinson, 2018 (Lime Tree-buzzer)
- Palapsalta palaga Owen and Moulds, 2016 (Northern River Tree-buzzer)
- Palapsalta serpens Owen and Moulds, 2016 (Pale-sided Tree-buzzer)
- Palapsalta virgulata (Ewart, 1989) (Striped Tree-buzzer)
- Palapsalta vitellina (Ewart, 1989) (Eastern River Tree-buzzer)
