= Popplepsalta aeroides =

Scientific classification
- Kingdom: Animalia
- Phylum: Arthropoda
- Clade: Pancrustacea
- Class: Insecta
- Order: Hemiptera
- Suborder: Auchenorrhyncha
- Family: Cicadidae
- Genus: Popplepsalta
- Species: P. aeroides

Binomial name
- Popplepsalta aeroides Owen & Moulds, 2016

Species of cicada

Popplepsalta aeroides is a species of cicada, also known as the blue-banded scratcher, in the true cicada family, Cicadettinae subfamily and Cicadettini tribe. The species is endemic to Australia. It was described in 2016 by entomologists Christopher L. Owen and Maxwell Sydney Moulds.

== Description ==
The length of the forewing is 19–25 mm.

== Distribution and habitat ==
The species is known from south-east Queensland southwards along the Great Dividing Range to the Bega district in southern New South Wales. The associated habitat is warm temperate, sheltered open forest.

== Behaviour ==
Adult males may be heard from October to January, clinging to the upper branches of eucalypts, emitting rapid, low-pitched, soft chirping calls during sunny conditions.
