= Gudanga kolos =

Scientific classification
- Kingdom: Animalia
- Phylum: Arthropoda
- Clade: Pancrustacea
- Class: Insecta
- Order: Hemiptera
- Suborder: Auchenorrhyncha
- Family: Cicadidae
- Genus: Gudanga
- Species: G. kolos

Binomial name
- Gudanga kolos Moulds & Marshall, 2025

Species of cicada

Gudanga kolos is a species of cicada in the true cicada family, Cicadettinae subfamily and Cicadettini tribe. It is endemic to Australia. It was described in 2025 by Australian entomologists Maxwell Sydney Moulds and David C. Marshall.

== Etymology ==
The specific epithet kolos comes from Greek kolos (‘incomplete’), referring to the reduced black pigmentation on the forewings when compared with the species’ congeners.

== Distribution and habitat ==
The species occurs in inland southern Western Australia west of the Great Victoria Desert. The cicadas are found on sheoak trees and shrubs, including Allocasuarina dielsiana and A. campestris, as well as melaleucas.
