= Gagatopsalta obscura =

Scientific classification
- Kingdom: Animalia
- Phylum: Arthropoda
- Clade: Pancrustacea
- Class: Insecta
- Order: Hemiptera
- Suborder: Auchenorrhyncha
- Family: Cicadidae
- Genus: Gagatopsalta
- Species: G. obscura

Binomial name
- Gagatopsalta obscura Ewart, 2005

Synonyms
- Gagatopsalta obscurus Ewart, 2005

Species of cicada

Gagatopsalta obscura is a species of cicada, also known as the clip-clop cicada, in the true cicada family, Cicadettinae subfamily and Cicadettini tribe. It is endemic to Australia. It was described in 2005 by Australian entomologist Anthony Ewart.

== Etymology ==
The specific epithet, from Latin obscurus (‘inconspicuous’), refers to the cicadas’ habits and behaviour.

== Description ==
The length of the forewing is 15–17 mm.

== Distribution and habitat ==
The species is known only from the Adavale district of South West Queensland. Its associated habitat is woodland dominated by Acacia cambagei (gidgee).

== Behaviour ==
Adults have been heard from November to January, clinging to the outer branches of the gidgee, uttering syncopated, double-ticking calls.
