= Palapsalta ligneocauda =

Scientific classification
- Kingdom: Animalia
- Phylum: Arthropoda
- Clade: Pancrustacea
- Class: Insecta
- Order: Hemiptera
- Suborder: Auchenorrhyncha
- Family: Cicadidae
- Genus: Palapsalta
- Species: P. ligneocauda

Binomial name
- Palapsalta ligneocauda Emery, Emery & Hutchinson 2018

Species of cicada

Palapsalta ligneocauda is a species of cicada, also known as the lime tree-buzzer, in the true cicada family, Cicadettinae subfamily and Cicadettini tribe. It is endemic to Australia. It was described in 2018 by Australian entomologists David L. Emery, Nathan J. Emery and Paul M. Hutchinson.

== Etymology ==
The specific epithet ligneocauda refers to the wood-brown colouration of parts of the species’ anatomy.

== Description ==
The length of the forewing is 13–17 mm.

== Distribution and habitat ==
The species occurs from the Kimberley region of northern Western Australia eastwards to Cape Crawford in the Northern Territory. The associated habitat is riverine eucalypt woodland.

== Behaviour ==
Adult males may be heard from November to March, clinging to the upper branches of eucalypts, uttering songs characterised by short buzzing notes followed by a lilting sequence.
