= Gudanga browni =

Scientific classification
- Kingdom: Animalia
- Phylum: Arthropoda
- Clade: Pancrustacea
- Class: Insecta
- Order: Hemiptera
- Suborder: Auchenorrhyncha
- Family: Cicadidae
- Genus: Gudanga
- Species: G. browni

Binomial name
- Gudanga browni (Distant, 1913)

Synonyms
- Paragudanga browni Distant, 1913

Species of cicada

Gudanga browni is a species of cicada, also known as the orange blackwing, in the true cicada family, Cicadettinae subfamily and Cicadettini tribe. It is endemic to Australia. It was described in 1913 by English entomologist William Lucas Distant.

== Description ==
The length of the forewing is 17–26 mm.

== Distribution and habitat ==
The species occurs in central Western Australia in the area between Mount Magnet, Comet Vale, Wiluna and Cue. The holotype was collected at Cue. Its associated habitat is mulga woodland.

== Behaviour ==
Adults are heard from January to March, clinging to the trunks and upper branches of mulga trees.
