= Palapsalta serpens =

Scientific classification
- Kingdom: Animalia
- Phylum: Arthropoda
- Clade: Pancrustacea
- Class: Insecta
- Order: Hemiptera
- Suborder: Auchenorrhyncha
- Family: Cicadidae
- Genus: Palapsalta
- Species: P. serpens

Binomial name
- Palapsalta serpens Owen & Moulds, 2016

Species of cicada

Palapsalta serpens is a species of cicada, also known as the pale-sided tree-buzzer, in the true cicada family, Cicadettinae subfamily and Cicadettini tribe. It is endemic to Australia. It was described in 2016 by entomologists Christopher Owen and Maxwell Sydney Moulds.

== Etymology ==
The specific epithet serpens (Latin: ‘snake’) refers to the resemblance of the sclerotised projection, at the end of the male endotheca, to a snake’s forked tongue.

== Description ==
The length of the forewing is 16–18 mm.

== Distribution and habitat ==
The species occurs in the Top End of the Northern Territory, including Kakadu National Park. The associated habitat is eucalypt woodland.

== Behaviour ==
Adult males may be heard in January and February, clinging to the upper branches of eucalypts, emitting stuttering and buzzing songs.
