= Popplepsalta simplex =

Scientific classification
- Kingdom: Animalia
- Phylum: Arthropoda
- Clade: Pancrustacea
- Class: Insecta
- Order: Hemiptera
- Suborder: Auchenorrhyncha
- Family: Cicadidae
- Genus: Popplepsalta
- Species: P. simplex

Binomial name
- Popplepsalta simplex (Popple, 2013)

Synonyms
- Pauropsalta simplex Popple, 2013

Species of cicada

Popplepsalta simplex is a species of cicada, also known as the Atherton squeaker, in the true cicada family, Cicadettinae subfamily and Cicadettini tribe. The species is endemic to Australia. It was described in 2013 by Australian entomologist Lindsay Popple.

== Description ==
The length of the forewing is 14–17 mm.

== Distribution and habitat ==
The species is known from north-eastern Queensland, from Julatten southwards to Townsville. The associated habitat is eucalypt woodland.

== Behaviour ==
Adult males may be heard in December and January, while clinging to the foliage and upper branches of trees, shrubs and grass stems, emitting simple buzzing calls.
