= Popplepsalta tremula =

Scientific classification
- Kingdom: Animalia
- Phylum: Arthropoda
- Clade: Pancrustacea
- Class: Insecta
- Order: Hemiptera
- Suborder: Auchenorrhyncha
- Family: Cicadidae
- Genus: Popplepsalta
- Species: P. tremula

Binomial name
- Popplepsalta tremula (Popple, 2013)

Synonyms
- Pauropsalta tremula Popple, 2013

Species of cicada

Popplepsalta tremula is a species of cicada, also known as the maraca squeaker, in the true cicada family, Cicadettinae subfamily and Cicadettini tribe. The species is endemic to Australia. It was described in 2013 by Australian entomologist Lindsay Popple.

== Description ==
The length of the forewing is 15–18 mm.

== Distribution and habitat ==
The species occurs in inland south-eastern Queensland from Carnarvon Gorge and Eidsvold southwards to Goondiwindi, Inglewood and the Leslie Dam. Associated habitats include open sclerophyll forest and woodland with red gum, box and ironbark eucalypts.

== Behaviour ==
Adult males may be heard from October to February, clinging to the upper branches and foliage of eucalypts, emitting lilting, maraca-like, chirping calls.
