= Toxala =

Scientific classification
- Kingdom: Animalia
- Phylum: Arthropoda
- Clade: Pancrustacea
- Class: Insecta
- Order: Hemiptera
- Suborder: Auchenorrhyncha
- Infraorder: Cicadomorpha
- Superfamily: Cicadoidea
- Family: Cicadidae
- Subfamily: Cicadettinae
- Genus: Toxala; Moulds, 2012

Genus of cicadas

Toxala is a genus of cicadas, also known as grass-buzzers, in the family Cicadidae, subfamily Cicadettinae and tribe Cicadettini. It is endemic to Australia. It was described in 2012 by Australian entomologist Maxwell Sydney Moulds.

== Etymology ==
The genus name Toxala is derived from Greek toxon (‘bowed’), with reference to the shape of the costal margin of the forewing.

== Species ==
As of 2025 there were two described species in the genus:

- Toxala mckinnonae Popple, 2015 (Herberton Grass-buzzer)
- Toxala verna (Distant, 1912) (Bent-winged Grass-buzzer)
