= Palapsalta circumdata =

Scientific classification
- Kingdom: Animalia
- Phylum: Arthropoda
- Clade: Pancrustacea
- Class: Insecta
- Order: Hemiptera
- Suborder: Auchenorrhyncha
- Family: Cicadidae
- Genus: Palapsalta
- Species: P. circumdata

Binomial name
- Palapsalta circumdata (Walker, 1852)

Synonyms
- Cicada circumdata Walker, 1852; Tettigonia marginata Leach, 1814; Cicada themiscura Walker, 1850; Melampsalta fletcheri Goding & Froggatt, 1904; Cicada marginata Walker, 1850

Species of cicada

Palapsalta circumdata is a species, or species complex, of cicadas, also known as bronze tree-buzzers, in the true cicada family, Cicadettinae subfamily and Cicadettini tribe. It is endemic to Australia. It was described in 1852 by English entomologist Francis Walker.

== Description ==
The length of the forewing is 17–22 mm.

== Distribution and habitat ==
The known range of the species complex extends from the Blackdown Tableland and Carnarvon National Park in Central Queensland, southwards through the Greater Brisbane region and eastern New South Wales to Jervis Bay. Associated habitats include open eucalypt forest, often on sandstone soils and with a heathy understorey.

== Behaviour ==
Adult males may be heard from late September to June, clinging high up on tall eucalypts, uttering drawn-out, shivering, buzzing calls which increase in amplitude.
