= Plerapsalta =

Scientific classification
- Kingdom: Animalia
- Phylum: Arthropoda
- Clade: Pancrustacea
- Class: Insecta
- Order: Hemiptera
- Suborder: Auchenorrhyncha
- Family: Cicadidae
- Subfamily: Cicadettinae
- Genus: Plerapsalta; Moulds, 2012

Genus of cicadas

Plerapsalta is a genus of cicadas, also known as ambertails, in the family Cicadidae, subfamily Cicadettinae and tribe Cicadettini. It is endemic to Australia. It was described in 2012 by Australian entomologist Maxwell Sydney Moulds.

== Etymology ==
The genus name Plerapsalta is a combination derived from Latin plerus (‘abundant’) with reference to the large numbers of these cicadas sometimes encountered, with psalta (from Latin psaltria – a female harpist) which is traditionally used as a suffix on many genus names of cicadas.

== Species ==
As of 2025 there were two described species in the genus:

- Plerapsalta incipiens (Walker, 1850) (Tiny Ambertail)
- Plerapsalta multifascia (Walker, 1850) (Neon Ambertail)
