= Gagatopsalta auranti =

Scientific classification
- Kingdom: Animalia
- Phylum: Arthropoda
- Clade: Pancrustacea
- Class: Insecta
- Order: Hemiptera
- Suborder: Auchenorrhyncha
- Family: Cicadidae
- Genus: Gagatopsalta
- Species: G. auranti

Binomial name
- Gagatopsalta auranti Ewart, 2005

Species of cicada

Gagatopsalta auranti is a species of cicada, also known as the painted brigalow ticker, in the true cicada family, Cicadettinae subfamily and Cicadettini tribe. It is endemic to Australia. It was described in 2005 by Australian entomologist Anthony Ewart.

== Etymology ==
The specific epithet auranti refers to the bright orange markings of the cicada, which contrast with the shiny black of the body.

== Description ==
The length of the forewing is 13–16 mm.

== Distribution and habitat ==
The species occurs in South Eastern Queensland. Its associated habitat includes remnant areas of brigalow scrub.

== Behaviour ==
Adults have been heard between December and March, clinging to the outer foliage of the brigalow, uttering rapid, high-frequency, ticking and clicking calls.
