= Gudanga nowlandi =

Scientific classification
- Kingdom: Animalia
- Phylum: Arthropoda
- Clade: Pancrustacea
- Class: Insecta
- Order: Hemiptera
- Suborder: Auchenorrhyncha
- Family: Cicadidae
- Genus: Gudanga
- Species: G. nowlandi

Binomial name
- Gudanga nowlandi Ewart & Popple, 2013

Species of cicada

Gudanga nowlandi is a species of cicada, also known as the mulga blackwing, in the true cicada family, Cicadettinae subfamily and Cicadettini tribe. It is endemic to Australia. It was described in 2013 by entomologists Anthony Ewart and Lindsay Popple.

== Etymology ==
The specific epithet nowlandi honours J. Nowland, of the Nowland pastoral clan who owned and managed the ‘Bulls Gully’ and ‘Milroy’ properties, and who found many cicada specimens.

== Description ==
The length of the forewing is 15–20 mm.

== Distribution and habitat ==
The species occurs in the area between Windorah, Adavale, Eulo and Currawinya National Park in south-western Queensland. The holotype was collected at Bulls Gully Lagoon, Adavale. Its associated habitat is mulga, and sometimes gidgee, woodland.

== Behaviour ==
Adults are heard from September to March, clinging to the trunks and upper branches of the trees, uttering calls characterised by rapid phrases of triple chirps, occasionally interspersed by an extended buzz.
