= Kobonga oxleyi =

Scientific classification
- Kingdom: Animalia
- Phylum: Arthropoda
- Clade: Pancrustacea
- Class: Insecta
- Order: Hemiptera
- Suborder: Auchenorrhyncha
- Family: Cicadidae
- Genus: Kobonga
- Species: K. oxleyi

Binomial name
- Kobonga oxleyi (Distant, 1882)

Synonyms
- Melampsalta oxleyi Distant, 1882

Species of cicada

Kobonga oxleyi is a species or species complex of cicada, also known as the Moree dinger, in the true cicada family, Cicadettinae subfamily and Cicadettini tribe. It is endemic to Australia. It was described in 1882 by English entomologist William Lucas Distant.

== Description ==
The length of the forewing is 21–26 mm.

== Distribution and habitat ==
The species occurs from Hervey Range in North Queensland southwards through inland New South Wales to north-western Victoria and the border with South Australia. Its associated habitats include brigalow and casuarina woodland and acacia shrubland.

== Behaviour ==
Adult males are heard from September to February, clinging to the upper branches of trees, especially acacias, uttering repetitive sequences of loud ding-ding-ding-ding calls.
