= Gudanga solata =

Scientific classification
- Kingdom: Animalia
- Phylum: Arthropoda
- Clade: Pancrustacea
- Class: Insecta
- Order: Hemiptera
- Suborder: Auchenorrhyncha
- Family: Cicadidae
- Genus: Gudanga
- Species: G. solata

Binomial name
- Gudanga solata Moulds, 1996

Species of cicada

Gudanga solata is a species of cicada, also known as the dark red blackwing, in the true cicada family, Cicadettinae subfamily and Cicadettini tribe. It is endemic to Australia. It was described in 1996 by Australian entomologist Maxwell Sydney Moulds.

== Etymology ==
The specific epithet solata is derived from Latin solatus (‘sunburnt’), referring both to the reddish colouration of the cicadas, and the hot and arid climate of their range.

== Description ==
The length of the forewing is 18–22 mm.

== Distribution and habitat ==
The species is only known from an area between Cue and south of Mount Magnet in Western Australia. Its associated habitat includes mulga woodland.

== Behaviour ==
Adults appear in January, clinging to the trunks and branches of wattle trees.
