= Gudanga emmotti =

Scientific classification
- Kingdom: Animalia
- Phylum: Arthropoda
- Clade: Pancrustacea
- Class: Insecta
- Order: Hemiptera
- Suborder: Auchenorrhyncha
- Family: Cicadidae
- Genus: Gudanga
- Species: G. emmotti

Binomial name
- Gudanga emmotti Ewart & Popple, 2013

Species of cicada

Gudanga emmotti is a species of cicada, also known as the Noonbah blackwing, in the true cicada family, Cicadettinae subfamily and Cicadettini tribe. It is endemic to Australia. It was described in 2013 by entomologists Anthony Ewart and Lindsay Popple.

== Etymology ==
The specific epithet emmotti honours Angus Emmott of Noonbah Station for his systematic insect collecting in western Queensland and contributions to the natural science of inland Australia.

== Description ==
The length of the forewing is 16–19 mm.

== Distribution and habitat ==
The species is only known from an area between north of Windorah to the Stonehenge district in the Channel Country of Western Queensland. Its associated habitat is mulga or red mulga woodland.

== Behaviour ==
Adults are heard from January to March, clinging to the trunks and upper branches of the mulga trees, uttering calls characterised by rapid phrases of triple chirps.
