= Gudanga adamsi =

Scientific classification
- Kingdom: Animalia
- Phylum: Arthropoda
- Clade: Pancrustacea
- Class: Insecta
- Order: Hemiptera
- Suborder: Auchenorrhyncha
- Family: Cicadidae
- Genus: Gudanga
- Species: G. adamsi

Binomial name
- Gudanga adamsi Moulds, 1996

Species of cicada

Gudanga adamsi is a species of cicada, also known as the northern brigalow blackwing, in the true cicada family, Cicadettinae subfamily and Cicadettini tribe. It is endemic to Australia. It was described in 1996 by Australian entomologist Maxwell Sydney Moulds.

== Etymology ==
The specific epithet adamsi honours Ernest Adams of ‘Mourangee’ Homestead, who collected much of the type series, for his lifetime contributions to knowledge of Australian entomology.

== Description ==
The length of the forewing is 14–18 mm.

== Distribution and habitat ==
The species occurs from Moranbah south to Taroom and Injune and west to Tambo, in the Brigalow Belt of inland Central Queensland. Its associated habitat includes Dawson gum and brigalow woodlands.

== Behaviour ==
Adults appear from October to February, clinging to the main trunks of the trees, against the dark-coloured bark which effectively camouflages them.
