= Chelapsalta puer =

Scientific classification
- Kingdom: Animalia
- Phylum: Arthropoda
- Clade: Pancrustacea
- Class: Insecta
- Order: Hemiptera
- Suborder: Auchenorrhyncha
- Family: Cicadidae
- Genus: Chelapsalta
- Species: C. puer

Binomial name
- Chelapsalta puer (Walker, 1850)

Synonyms
- Cicadetta puer Walker, 1850

Species of cicada

Chelapsalta puer is a species or species complex of cicadas, also known as the cassinia cicada, in the true cicada family, Cicadettinae subfamily and Cicadettini tribe. It is endemic to Australia. It was described in 1850 by English entomologist Francis Walker.

== Description ==
The length of the forewing is 15–18 mm.

== Distribution and habitat ==
The range of the species complex extends over much of inland south-eastern Australia, covering parts of inland south-eastern Queensland, New South Wales, Victoria and eastern South Australia. The associated habitat is woodland and shrubland with Cassinia spp.

== Behaviour ==
Adults may be heard from September to March, uttering monotonous, high-pitched calls.
