= Popplepsalta corymbiae =

Scientific classification
- Kingdom: Animalia
- Phylum: Arthropoda
- Clade: Pancrustacea
- Class: Insecta
- Order: Hemiptera
- Suborder: Auchenorrhyncha
- Family: Cicadidae
- Genus: Popplepsalta
- Species: P. corymbiae

Binomial name
- Popplepsalta corymbiae (Popple, 2013)

Synonyms
- Pauropsalta corymbiae Popple, 2013

Species of cicada

Popplepsalta corymbiae is a species of cicada, also known as the western red-eyed squeaker, in the true cicada family, Cicadettinae subfamily and Cicadettini tribe. The species is endemic to Australia. It was described in 2013 by Australian entomologist Lindsay Popple.

== Description ==
The length of the forewing is 15–18 mm.

== Distribution and habitat ==
The species occurs across much of central Australia from Minilya, Western Australia eastwards through the Northern Territory to the Cloncurry district in western Queensland. The associated habitat is arid zone open eucalypt woodland.

== Behaviour ==
Adult males may be heard from October to January, clinging to eucalypts, including desert bloodwoods and ghost gums, emitting calls characterised by rapidly alternating long and short chirps.
