= Popplepsalta blackdownensis =

Scientific classification
- Kingdom: Animalia
- Phylum: Arthropoda
- Clade: Pancrustacea
- Class: Insecta
- Order: Hemiptera
- Suborder: Auchenorrhyncha
- Family: Cicadidae
- Genus: Popplepsalta
- Species: P. blackdownensis

Binomial name
- Popplepsalta blackdownensis (Popple, 2013)

Synonyms
- Pauropsalta blackdownensis Popple, 2013

Species of cicada

Popplepsalta blackdownensis is a species of cicada, also known as the Blackdown squeaker or Dawson Range squeaker, in the true cicada family, Cicadettinae subfamily and Cicadettini tribe. The species is endemic to Australia. It was described in 2013 by Australian entomologist Lindsay Popple.

== Description ==
The length of the forewing is 15–19 mm.

== Distribution and habitat ==
The species occurs on the Blackdown Tableland of the Central Highlands Region of Queensland, including the Expedition Range and Dawson Range. The associated habitat is eucalypt forest on sandstone mountains and plateaus.

== Behaviour ==
Adult males may be heard from October to January, clinging to the upper branches of eucalypts, emitting slow, maraca-like, chirping calls.
