= Kobonga froggatti =

Scientific classification
- Kingdom: Animalia
- Phylum: Arthropoda
- Clade: Pancrustacea
- Class: Insecta
- Order: Hemiptera
- Suborder: Auchenorrhyncha
- Family: Cicadidae
- Genus: Kobonga
- Species: K. froggatti

Binomial name
- Kobonga froggatti Distant, 1913

Synonyms
- Kobonga castanea Ashton, 1914

Species of cicada

Kobonga froggatti is a species of cicada, also known as the maroon clicker, in the true cicada family, Cicadettinae subfamily and Cicadettini tribe. It is endemic to Australia. It was described in 1913 by English entomologist William Lucas Distant.

== Description ==
The length of the forewing is 31–41 mm.

== Distribution and habitat ==
The species occurs in Central Australia from Coober Pedy in northern South Australia northwards to near Tilmouth Well, some 200 km north-west of Alice Springs, in the Northern Territory, as well as in Western Australia from Leonora north-westwards to near Karratha. Its associated habitat is acacia shrubland, particularly mulga (Acacia aneura).

== Behaviour ==
Adult males are heard from December to February, clinging to the main trunks and branches of acacias, uttering robust buzzing and clicking calls.
