= Chelapsalta myoporae =

Scientific classification
- Kingdom: Animalia
- Phylum: Arthropoda
- Clade: Pancrustacea
- Class: Insecta
- Order: Hemiptera
- Suborder: Auchenorrhyncha
- Family: Cicadidae
- Genus: Chelapsalta
- Species: C. myoporae

Binomial name
- Chelapsalta myoporae Ewart, Popple & Marshall, 2015

Species of cicada

Chelapsalta myoporae is a species of cicada, also known as the copper shrub-buzzer, in the true cicada family, Cicadettinae subfamily and Cicadettini tribe. It is endemic to Australia. It was described in 2015 by Australian entomologists Anthony Ewart, Lindsay Popple and David C. Marshall.

== Description ==
The length of the forewing is 15–18 mm.

== Distribution and habitat ==
The species' range extends from southern inland Queensland, through central north-western New South Wales into eastern South Australia. The associated habitat is woodland and shrubland with Eremophila spp.

== Behaviour ==
Adults may be heard from September to February, uttering chirping calls with intermittent pauses.
