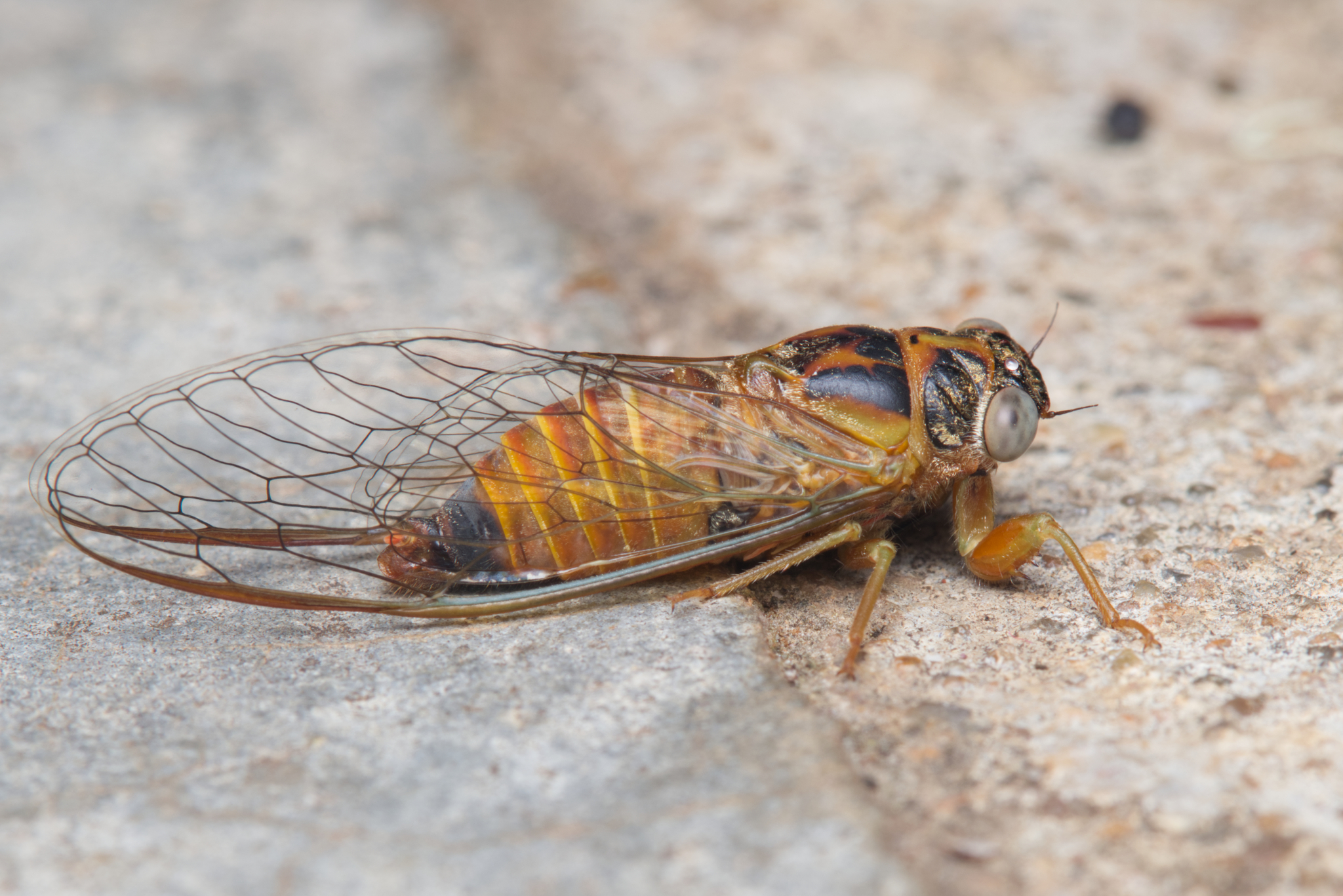

Scientific classification
- Kingdom: Animalia
- Phylum: Arthropoda
- Clade: Pancrustacea
- Class: Insecta
- Order: Hemiptera
- Suborder: Auchenorrhyncha
- Family: Cicadidae
- Genus: Palapsalta
- Species: P. eyrei

Binomial name
- Palapsalta eyrei (Distant, 1882)

Synonyms
- Melampsalta eyrei Distant, 1904; Pauropsalta eyrei (Distant, 1882)

= Palapsalta eyrei =

Species of cicada

Palapsalta eyrei is a species of cicada, also known as the yellow tree-buzzer, in the true cicada family, Cicadettinae subfamily and Cicadettini tribe. It was described in 1882 by English entomologist William Lucas Distant.

== Description ==
The length of the forewing is 12–19 mm.

== Distribution and habitat ==
The species is native to New Guinea and Australia. Within Australia it occurs from the Cape York Peninsula inland to Mount Isa and Gunpowder, south to Carnarvon National Park and south-east to Gympie. Associated habitats include tropical woodlands, often with poplar gums.

== Behaviour ==
Adult males may be heard from November to May, clinging high up on tall eucalypts, uttering continuous, soft, buzzing calls.

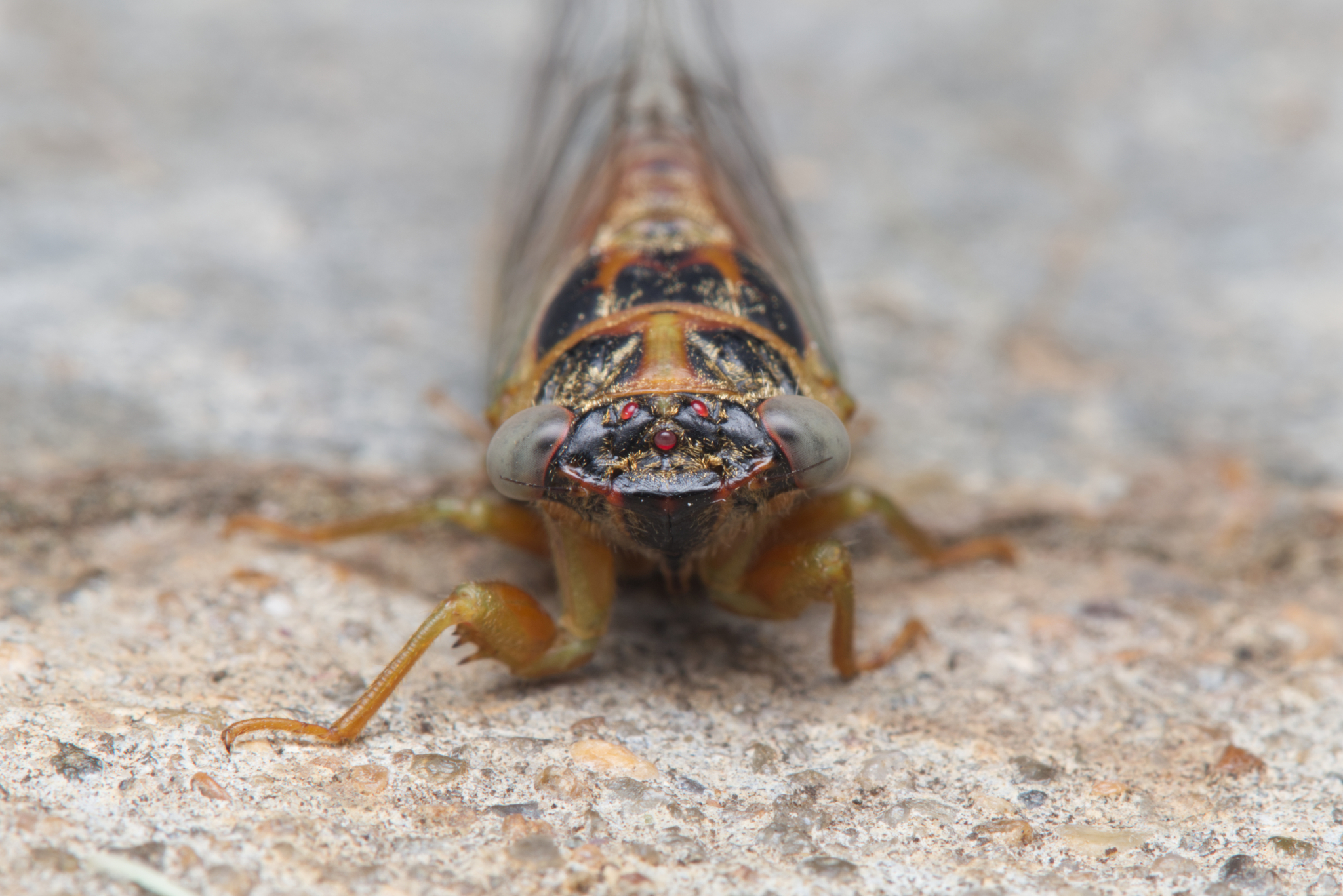
