= Palapsalta vitellina =

Scientific classification
- Kingdom: Animalia
- Phylum: Arthropoda
- Clade: Pancrustacea
- Class: Insecta
- Order: Hemiptera
- Suborder: Auchenorrhyncha
- Family: Cicadidae
- Genus: Palapsalta
- Species: P. vitellina

Binomial name
- Palapsalta vitellina (Ewart, 1989)

Synonyms
- Pauropsalta vitellinus Ewart, 1989

Species of cicada

Palapsalta vitellina is a species of cicada, also known as the eastern river tree-buzzer, in the true cicada family, Cicadettinae subfamily and Cicadettini tribe. It is endemic to Australia. It was described in 1989 by Australian entomologist Anthony Ewart.

== Etymology ==
The specific epithet vitellina is derived from Latin vitellinus (yellow, as in the yolk of an egg), with reference to body colouration.

== Description ==
The length of the forewing is 21–26 mm.

== Distribution and habitat ==
The species is widespread in Queensland, from Cardwell west to Julia Creek and south to Lemontree. Associated habitats include open eucalypt forest bordering inland rivers, swamps and open grassland, as well as on ridgetops.

== Behaviour ==
Adult males may be heard from November to February, clinging to the upper branches of eucalypts, uttering sharp, repetitive, double-chirping calls.
