= Popplepsalta inversa =

Scientific classification
- Kingdom: Animalia
- Phylum: Arthropoda
- Clade: Pancrustacea
- Class: Insecta
- Order: Hemiptera
- Suborder: Auchenorrhyncha
- Family: Cicadidae
- Genus: Popplepsalta
- Species: P. inversa

Binomial name
- Popplepsalta inversa (Popple, 2013)

Synonyms
- Pauropsalta inversa Popple, 2013

Species of cicada

Popplepsalta inversa is a species of cicada, also known as the retro squeaker, in the true cicada family, Cicadettinae subfamily and Cicadettini tribe. The species is endemic to Australia. It was described in 2013 by Australian entomologist Lindsay Popple.

== Description ==
The length of the forewing is 14–16 mm.

== Distribution and habitat ==
The species occurs in central and southern inland Queensland between Clermont, Augathella, Tambo, Mount Moffatt and Saint George, and eastwards into the upper river catchments of South East Queensland, as well as in isolated populations in New South Wales. Associated habitats include dry eucalypt woodlands, box eucalypts, white cypress-pines, parks and rural gardens. Favoured food trees include forest red gum and carbeen.

== Behaviour ==
Adult males may be heard from October to January, clinging to the upper branches and foliage of eucalypts and cypress-pines, emitting buzzing and chirping calls.
