= Kobonga godingi =

Scientific classification
- Kingdom: Animalia
- Phylum: Arthropoda
- Clade: Pancrustacea
- Class: Insecta
- Order: Hemiptera
- Suborder: Auchenorrhyncha
- Family: Cicadidae
- Genus: Kobonga
- Species: K. godingi

Binomial name
- Kobonga godingi (Distant, 1905)

Synonyms
- Melampsalta godingi Distant, 1905

Species of cicada

Kobonga godingi is a species of cicada, also known as the southern robust clicker, in the true cicada family, Cicadettinae subfamily and Cicadettini tribe. It is endemic to Australia. It was described in 1905 by English entomologist William Lucas Distant.

== Description ==
The length of the forewing is 21–25 mm.

== Distribution and habitat ==
The species occurs from the southern Northern Territory southwards through inland South Australia to western New South Wales and north-western Victoria, with an isolated population in the vicinity of Madura Station in south-eastern Western Australia. Its associated habitat is sparse chenopod shrubland.

== Behaviour ==
Adult males are heard from November to February, clinging to the foliage and inner stems of shrubs, uttering repetitive sequences of zeeps, followed by loud, rapid din-din-din-din calls.
