= Plerapsalta incipiens =

Scientific classification
- Kingdom: Animalia
- Phylum: Arthropoda
- Clade: Pancrustacea
- Class: Insecta
- Order: Hemiptera
- Suborder: Auchenorrhyncha
- Family: Cicadidae
- Genus: Plerapsalta
- Species: P. incipiens

Binomial name
- Plerapsalta incipiens (Walker, 1850)

Synonyms
- Cicada incipiens Walker, 1850; Cicadetta incipiens (Walker, 1850); Pauropsalta incipiens Goding & Froggatt, 1904; Melampsalta incipiens Distant, 1906; Melampsalta murrayensis Distant, 1907

Species of cicada

Plerapsalta incipiens is a species of cicada, also known as the pygmy yellowtail or tiny ambertail, in the true cicada family, Cicadettinae subfamily and Cicadettini tribe. The species is endemic to Australia. It was described in 1850 by English entomologist Francis Walker.

== Description ==
The length of the forewing is 13–14 mm.

== Distribution and habitat ==
The species occurs from central and southern Queensland through New South Wales to Victoria and south-eastern South Australia. The associated habitat is riverine woodland.

== Behaviour ==
Adult males may be heard from September to February, clinging to grass stems before moving to the trunks and upper branches of trees, emitting short, high-frequency, buzzing calls, monotonously repeated during bright sunshine.
