= Gudanga =

Scientific classification
- Kingdom: Animalia
- Phylum: Arthropoda
- Clade: Pancrustacea
- Class: Insecta
- Order: Hemiptera
- Suborder: Auchenorrhyncha
- Infraorder: Cicadomorpha
- Superfamily: Cicadoidea
- Family: Cicadidae
- Subfamily: Cicadettinae
- Genus: Gudanga; Distant, 1905

Genus of cicadas

Gudanga is a genus of cicadas, also known as blackwings, in the family Cicadidae, subfamily Cicadettinae and tribe Cicadettini. It is endemic to Australia. It was described in 1905 by English entomologist William Lucas Distant.

== Species ==
As of 2025 there were 11 described species in the genus:

- Gudanga adamsi Moulds, 1996 (Northern Brigalow Blackwing)
- Gudanga aurea Moulds, 1996 (Golden Blackwing)
- Gudanga boulayi Distant, 1905 (Red Blackwing)
- Gudanga browni (Distant, 1913) (Orange Blackwing)
- Gudanga emmotti Ewart and Popple, 2013 (Noonbah Blackwing)
- Gudanga kalgoorliensis Moulds, 1996 (Kalgoorlie Blackwing)
- Gudanga kolos Moulds & Marshall, 2025 (Wingpatch)
- Gudanga lithgowae Ewart and Popple, 2013 (Southern Brigalow Blackwing)
- Gudanga nowlandi Ewart and Popple, 2013 (Mulga Blackwing)
- Gudanga pterolongata Olive, 2007 (Croydon Blackwing)
- Gudanga solata Moulds, 1996 (Dark Red Blackwing)
