= Nelcyndana =

Scientific classification
- Kingdom: Animalia
- Phylum: Arthropoda
- Clade: Pancrustacea
- Class: Insecta
- Order: Hemiptera
- Suborder: Auchenorrhyncha
- Superfamily: Cicadoidea
- Family: Cicadidae
- Subfamily: Cicadettinae
- Tribe: Nelcyndanini
- Genus: Nelcyndana; Distant, 1906

Genus of true bugs

Nelcyndana is a genus of cicadas in the family Cicadidae, found in Peninsular Malaysia, Borneo and the Philippines. There are about five described species in Nelcyndana.

Nelcyndana is the only genus of the tribe Nelcyndanini.

== Species ==
These five species belong to the genus Nelcyndana:

- Nelcyndana borneensis Duffels, 2010
- Nelcyndana madagascariensis (Distant, 1905)
- Nelcyndana mulu Duffels, 2010
- Nelcyndana tener (Stal, 1870)
- Nelcyndana vantoli Duffels, 2010
