= Daza (cicada) =

Scientific classification
- Kingdom: Animalia
- Phylum: Arthropoda
- Class: Insecta
- Order: Hemiptera
- Suborder: Auchenorrhyncha
- Family: Cicadidae
- Tribe: Dazini
- Genus: Daza; Distant, 1905

Genus of true bugs

Daza is a genus of cicadas in the family Cicadidae. There are at least two described species in Daza.

== Species ==
These two species belong to the genus Daza:

- Daza montezuma (Walker, 1850)^{i c g}
- Daza nayaritensis Davis, 1934^{i c g}

Data sources: i = ITIS, c = Catalogue of Life, g = GBIF, b = Bugguide.net
