= Pagiphora =

Scientific classification
- Kingdom: Animalia
- Phylum: Arthropoda
- Clade: Pancrustacea
- Class: Insecta
- Order: Hemiptera
- Suborder: Auchenorrhyncha
- Superfamily: Cicadoidea
- Family: Cicadidae
- Subfamily: Cicadettinae
- Tribe: Pagiphorini
- Genus: Pagiphora; Horváth, 1912

Genus of true bugs

Pagiphora is a genus of Palearctic cicadas in the subfamily Cicadettinae, found in southern Europe and North Africa.

== Taxonomy ==
Pagiphora was formerly placed in the tribe Cicadettini, but is now the sole genus of the tribe Pagiphorini.

== Species ==
These five species belong to the genus Pagiphora:

- Pagiphora annulata (Brullé, 1832)
- Pagiphora aschei Kartal, 1978
- Pagiphora hauptosa Boulard, 1981
- Pagiphora maghrebensis Boulard, 1981
- Pagiphora yanni Boulard, 1992
