= Prasiini =

Scientific classification
- Kingdom: Animalia
- Phylum: Arthropoda
- Clade: Pancrustacea
- Class: Insecta
- Order: Hemiptera
- Suborder: Auchenorrhyncha
- Family: Cicadidae
- Subfamily: Cicadettinae
- Tribe: Prasiini; Matsumura, 1917

Tribe of true bugs

Prasiini is a tribe of cicadas in the family Cicadidae. There are about 9 genera and at least 50 described species in Prasiini, found in tropical Africa, Australasia, and the Neotropics.

== Genera ==
These five genera belong to the tribe Prasiini:

- Arfaka Distant, 1905^{c g}
- Jacatra Distant, 1905^{c g}
- Lembeja Distant, 1892^{c g}
- Mariekea Jong & Boer, 2004^{c g}
- Prasia Stål, 1863^{c g}

Data sources: i = ITIS, c = Catalogue of Life, g = GBIF, b = Bugguide.net
