= Cognadanga capricornica =

Scientific classification
- Kingdom: Animalia
- Phylum: Arthropoda
- Clade: Pancrustacea
- Class: Insecta
- Order: Hemiptera
- Suborder: Auchenorrhyncha
- Family: Cicadidae
- Genus: Cognadanga
- Species: C. capricornica

Binomial name
- Cognadanga capricornica Moulds & Marshall, 2025

Species of cicada

Cognadanga capricornica is a species of cicada, also known as the asphalt cicada, in the family, Cicadidae, subfamily Cicadettinae and tribe Cicadettini. The species is endemic to Australia. It was described in 2025 by Australian entomologists Maxwell Sydney Moulds and David C. Marshall.

== Etymology ==
The specific epithet capricornica refers to the latitude of the species’ type locality.

== Description ==
The length of the forewing is 14–15 mm. Body length is 13–15 mm.

== Distribution and habitat ==
The species is known only from the type locality some 20 km north of Alice Springs, in the Northern Territory, in the vicinity of the monument marking the latitude where the Stuart Highway crosses the Tropic of Capricorn. The associated habitat is low grassland.

== Behaviour ==
Adult males emit complex buzzing calls of repeated “de-deee” phrases.
