= Katoa =

Scientific classification
- Domain: Eukaryota
- Kingdom: Animalia
- Phylum: Arthropoda
- Class: Insecta
- Order: Hemiptera
- Suborder: Auchenorrhyncha
- Superfamily: Cicadoidea
- Family: Cicadidae
- Subfamily: Cicadettinae
- Tribe: Katoini
- Genus: Katoa; Ouchi, 1938

Synonyms
- Lisu, Liu, 1940

Genus of true bugs

Katoa is a genus of cicadas from Southeast Asia. The type species is Katoa tenmokuensis. Formerly placed in the tribe Tibicinini, after detailed morphological analysis, in 2012 Lee placed the genus among the Cicadettini, also of the subfamily Cicadettinae. After molecular phylogenetic analysis and physical examination, in 2018 Marshal, et al., placed the genus in its own tribe, Katoini, remaining in the subfamily Cicadettinae.

== Species ==
These six species are members of the genus Katoa:

- Katoa chlorotica Chou & Lu, 1997
- Katoa neokanagana (Liu & G.K.C., 1940)
- Katoa paucispina Lei & Chou, 1995
- Katoa paura Chou & Lu, 1997
- Katoa taibaiensis Chou & Lei, 1995
- Katoa tenmokuensis Ouchi, 1938
