= Lembeja paradoxa =

Scientific classification
- Kingdom: Animalia
- Phylum: Arthropoda
- Class: Insecta
- Order: Hemiptera
- Suborder: Auchenorrhyncha
- Family: Cicadidae
- Genus: Lembeja
- Species: L. paradoxa

Binomial name
- Lembeja paradoxa (Karsch, 1890)

Synonyms
- Lembeja acutipennis (Karsch, 1890); Lembeja australis Ashton, 1912; Lembeja brunneosa Distant, 1910; Perissoneura acutipennis Karsch, 1890; Perissoneura paradoxa Karsch, 1890; Prasia acutipennis (Karsch, 1890); Prasia paradoxa (Karsch, 1890)

Species of cicada

Lembeja paradoxa, also known as the bagpipe cicada, is an insect in the family Cicadidae. It is found in parts of the Cape York Peninsula, of Queensland, Australia.
