= Aragualna =

Scientific classification
- Kingdom: Animalia
- Phylum: Arthropoda
- Clade: Pancrustacea
- Class: Insecta
- Order: Hemiptera
- Suborder: Auchenorrhyncha
- Superfamily: Cicadoidea
- Family: Cicadidae
- Subfamily: Cicadettinae
- Tribe: Aragualnini
- Genus: Aragualna; Champanhet, Boulard & Gaiani, 2000

Genus of true bugs

Aragualna is a genus of cicadas in the family Cicadidae, found in Venezuela. There is at least one described species in Aragualna, A. plenalinea.

Aragualna is the only genus of the tribe Aragualnini.
