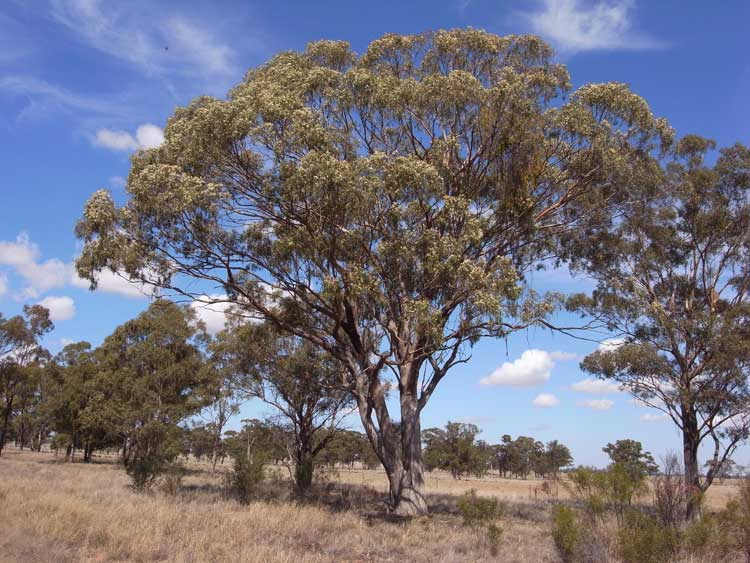
- Eucalyptus woollsiana near Gilgandra

Conservation status
- Endangered (IUCN 3.1)

Scientific classification
- Kingdom: Plantae
- Clade: Tracheophytes
- Clade: Angiosperms
- Clade: Eudicots
- Clade: Rosids
- Order: Myrtales
- Family: Myrtaceae
- Genus: Eucalyptus
- Species: E. woollsiana

Binomial name
- Eucalyptus woollsiana F.Muell. ex R.T.Baker

Synonyms
- Eucalyptus odorata var. woollsiana Maiden; Eucalyptus pilligaensis Maiden; Eucalyptus woollsiana F.Muell.

= Eucalyptus woollsiana =

Species of eucalyptus

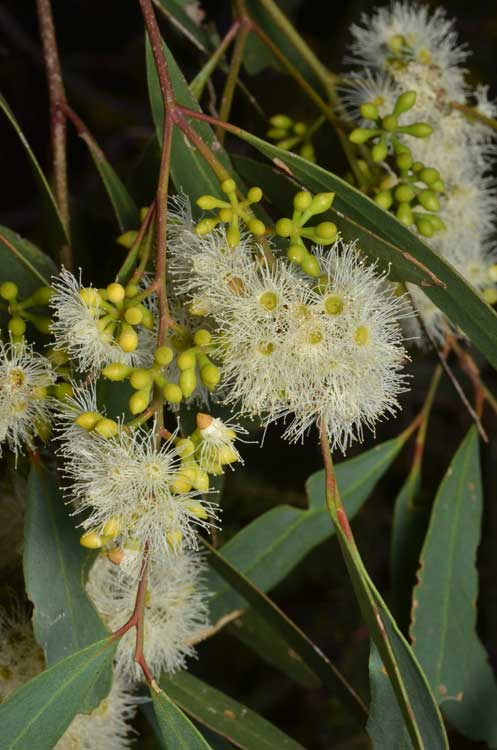
Flower buds and flowers

Eucalyptus woollsiana is a species of tree that is endemic to eastern Australia. It has rough, fibrous bark on the trunk, smooth bark above, lance-shaped adult leaves, flower buds in groups of five or seven, white flowers and cup-shaped fruit.

== Description ==
Eucalyptus woollsiana is a tree that typically grows to a height of 25 m (82 ft) and forms a lignotuber. It has rough, fibrous, grey bark on the trunk, smooth grey to yellowish bark above. Young plants and coppice regrowth have dull green, linear to broadly lance-shaped leaves that are 85–130 mm (3.3–5.1 in) long and 7–25 mm (0.28–0.98 in) wide. Adult leaves are glossy green, narrow lance-shaped to lance-shaped, 90–130 mm (3.5–5.1 in) long and 8–20 mm (0.31–0.79 in) wide on a petiole 7–10 mm (0.28–0.39 in) long. The flower buds are arranged in leaf axils or on the ends of branchlets in groups of five or seven on a peduncle 2–7 mm (0.079–0.276 in) long, the individual buds on pedicels 1.5–5 mm (0.059–0.197 in) long. Mature buds are oval to spindle-shaped, 3.5–5.5 mm (0.14–0.22 in) long and 2–3 mm (0.079–0.118 in) wide with a conical operculum that is about the same length as the floral cup. The flowers are white and the fruit is a woody cup-shaped to oval capsule 2–4 mm (0.079–0.157 in) long and 3–4 mm (0.12–0.16 in) wide.

== Taxonomy and naming ==
Eucalyptus woollsiana was first formally described in 1901 by Richard Thomas Baker in Proceedings of the Linnean Society of New South Wales.

== Distribution and habitat ==
This eucalypt grows on flat land, often with brigalow (Acacia harpophylla) and belah (Casuarina cristata) on heavy clay soils. It is widespread in inland Queensland south from Injune to the western slopes and plains of New South Wales. It intergrades with E. microcarpa at the southern end of its range.

== Conservation status ==
This species is classified as "least concern" under the Queensland Government Nature Conservation Act 1992.
