= Imbabura (cicada) =

Scientific classification
- Kingdom: Animalia
- Phylum: Arthropoda
- Clade: Pancrustacea
- Class: Insecta
- Order: Hemiptera
- Suborder: Auchenorrhyncha
- Family: Cicadidae
- Subtribe: Taphurina
- Genus: Imbabura; Distant, 1911

Genus of true bugs

Imbabura is a genus of cicadas in the family Cicadidae. There is at least one described species in Imbabura, I. typica.
