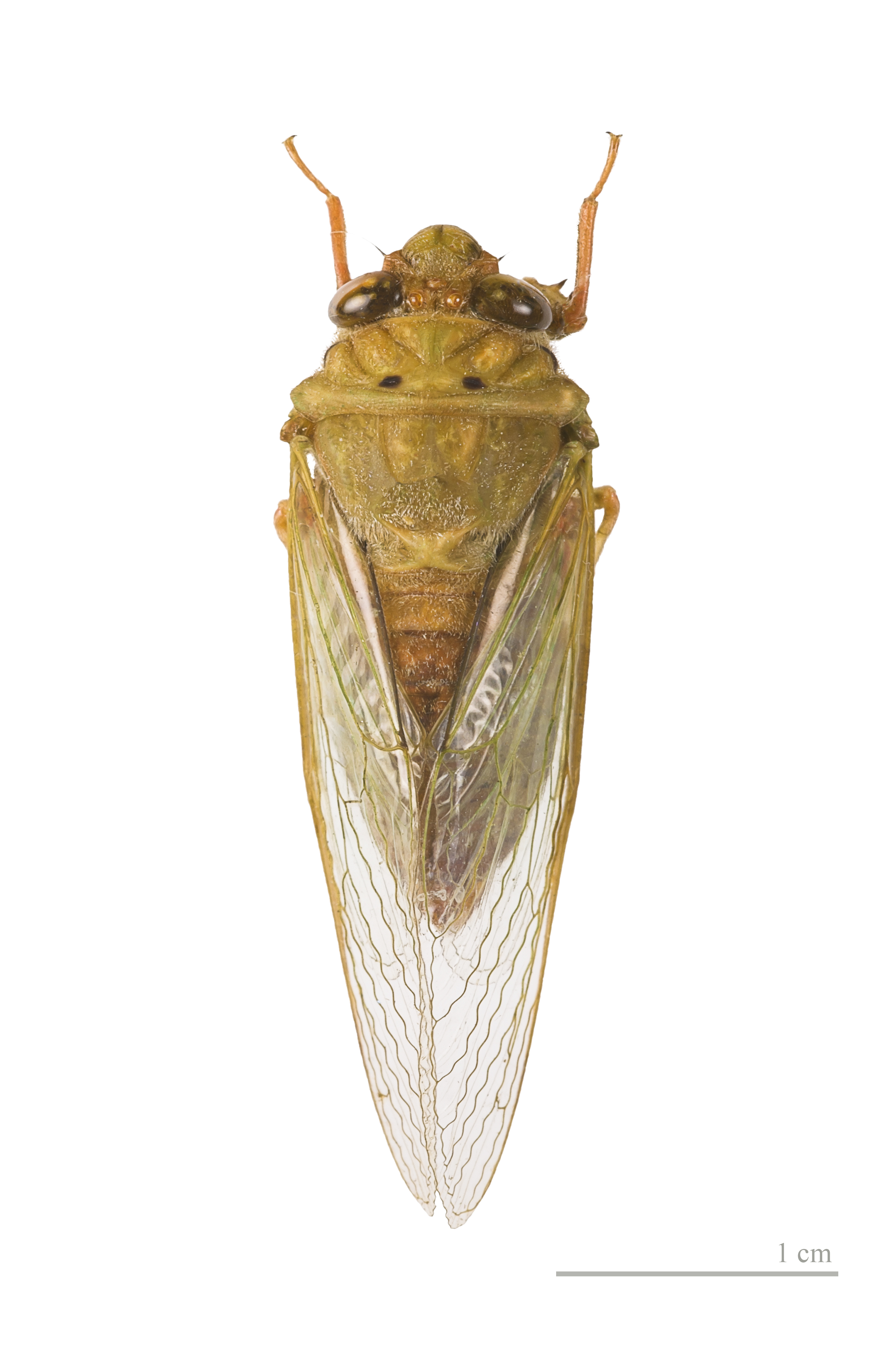
- Carineta rufescens

Scientific classification
- Kingdom: Animalia
- Phylum: Arthropoda
- Clade: Pancrustacea
- Class: Insecta
- Order: Hemiptera
- Suborder: Auchenorrhyncha
- Family: Cicadidae
- Subfamily: Cicadettinae; Buckton, 1890

= Cicadettinae =

Subfamily of cicada insects

Cicadettinae is a subfamily of cicadas in the family Cicadidae. About 230 genera and 1,200 described species are placed in the Cicadettinae.

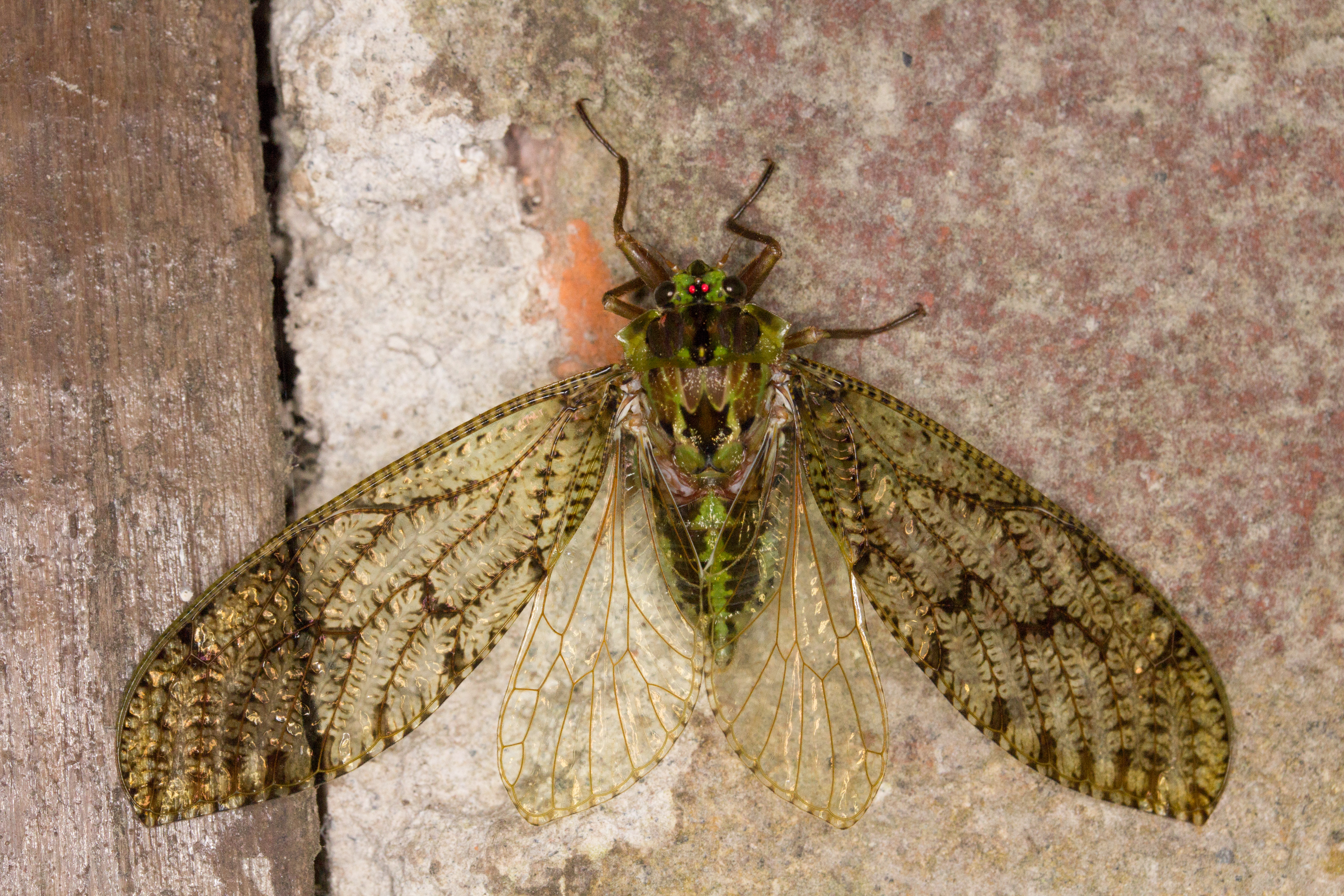
Onoralna species

== Tribes ==
The following tribes belong to the subfamily Cicadettinae:

1. Aragualnini Sanborn, 2018
2. Carinetini Distant, 1905
3. Chlorocystini Distant, 1905
4. Cicadatrini Distant, 1905
5. Cicadettini Buckton, 1890
6. Katoini Moulds & Marshall, 2018
7. Lamotialnini Boulard, 1976
8. Nelcyndanini Moulds & Marshall, 2018
9. Pagiphorini Moulds & Marshall, 2018
10. Parnisini Distant, 1905
11. Pictilini Moulds & Hill, 2018
12. Prasiini Matsumura, 1917
13. Taphurini Distant, 1905

Note: the monogeneric tribe Hemidictyini Distant, 1905 is now placed in the Tibicininae.

== See also ==
- List of Cicadettinae genera
