= Thopha hutchinsoni =

Scientific classification
- Kingdom: Animalia
- Phylum: Arthropoda
- Clade: Pancrustacea
- Class: Insecta
- Order: Hemiptera
- Suborder: Auchenorrhyncha
- Family: Cicadidae
- Genus: Thopha
- Species: T. hutchinsoni

Binomial name
- Thopha hutchinsoni Moulds, 2008

Species of cicada

Thopha hutchinsoni, also known as the Pilbara double drummer or north-western double drummer, is a species of cicada in the true cicada family, Cicadinae subfamily and Thophini tribe. It is endemic to Australia. It was described in 2008 by Australian entomologist Maxwell Sydney Moulds, and named after Paul Hutchinson, who collected the first specimens of the species.

== Description ==
This species has a golden color and, unlike other species of double drummers, lacks black markings on its head. The length of its forewing is 47–64 mm. According to entomologist Moulds, the Pilbara double drummer seems most closely related to T. sessiliba.

== Distribution and habitat ==
The species occurs in Exmouth and the eastern Pilbara region of Western Australia, and has been found near the coast of the Indian Ocean on occasion. The associated habitat is eucalypt woodland. Favoured trees include Eucalyptus camaldulensis and Corymbia hamersleyana, often growing in small gullies and on alluvial terraces.

== Behaviour ==
Adults have been heard in January and February, clinging to the main trunks and upper branches of eucalyptus, uttering loud, electric, whining calls. These calls have been compared to the calls of the Thopa emmotti, another species of the same genus.
