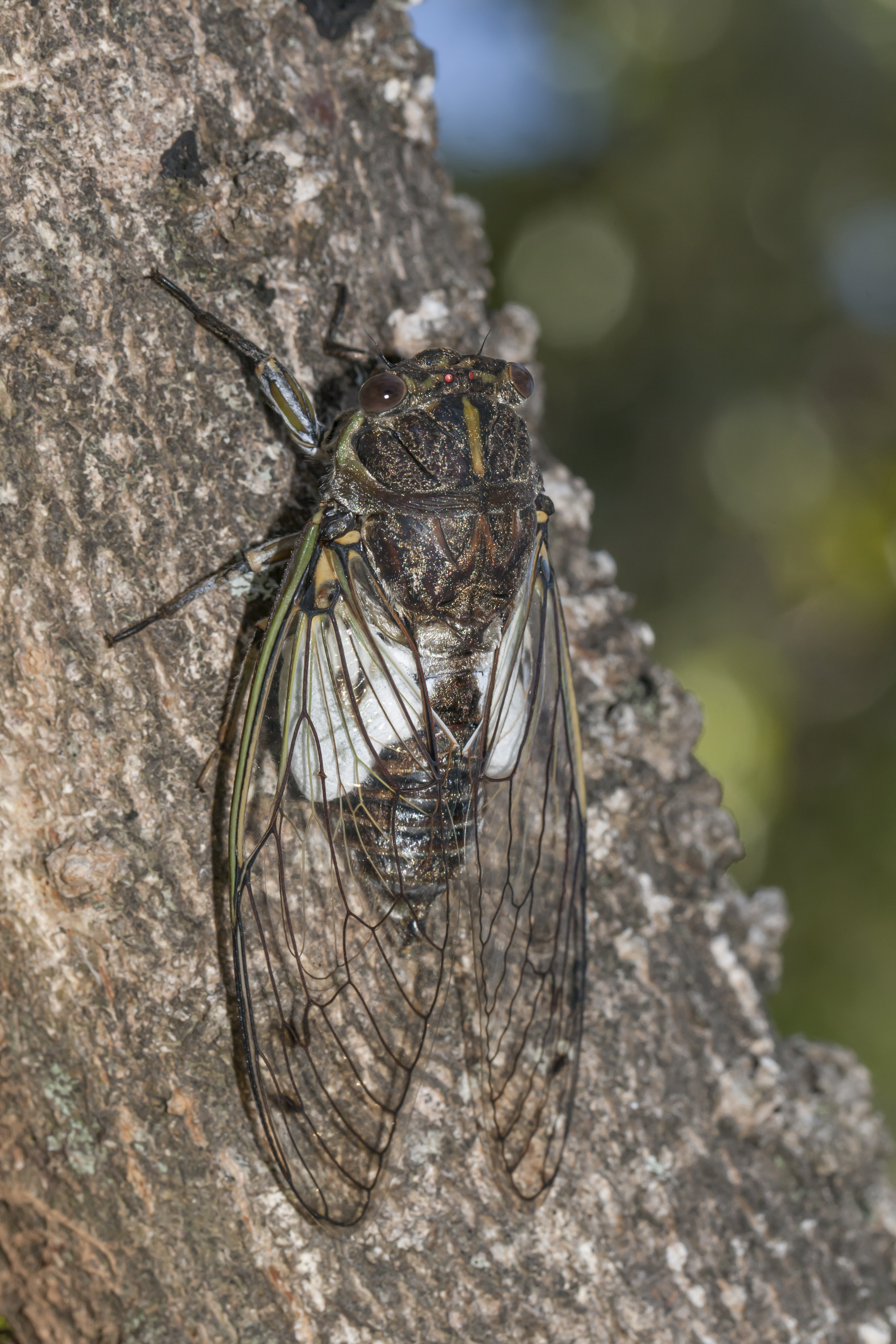
- Arunta perulata, live male
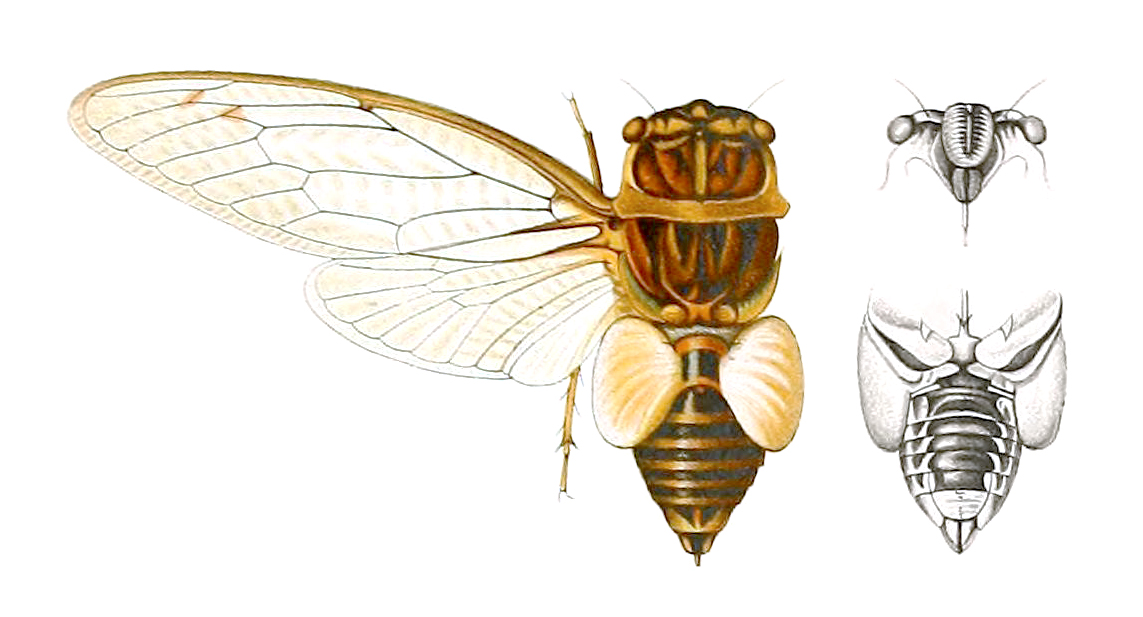
- Male specimen

Scientific classification
- Kingdom: Animalia
- Phylum: Arthropoda
- Clade: Pancrustacea
- Class: Insecta
- Order: Hemiptera
- Suborder: Auchenorrhyncha
- Family: Cicadidae
- Genus: Arunta
- Species: A. perulata

Binomial name
- Arunta perulata Guérin-Méneville (1831)

Synonyms
- Cicada perulata Guérin-Méneville; Thopha perulata Henicopsaltria perulata Arunta intermedia

= Arunta perulata =

Species of true bug

Arunta perulata is a large cicada native to Australia. It is also known as the white drummer cicada. The name floury baker was previously applied to this species, but that name is now specific to Aleeta curvicosta.

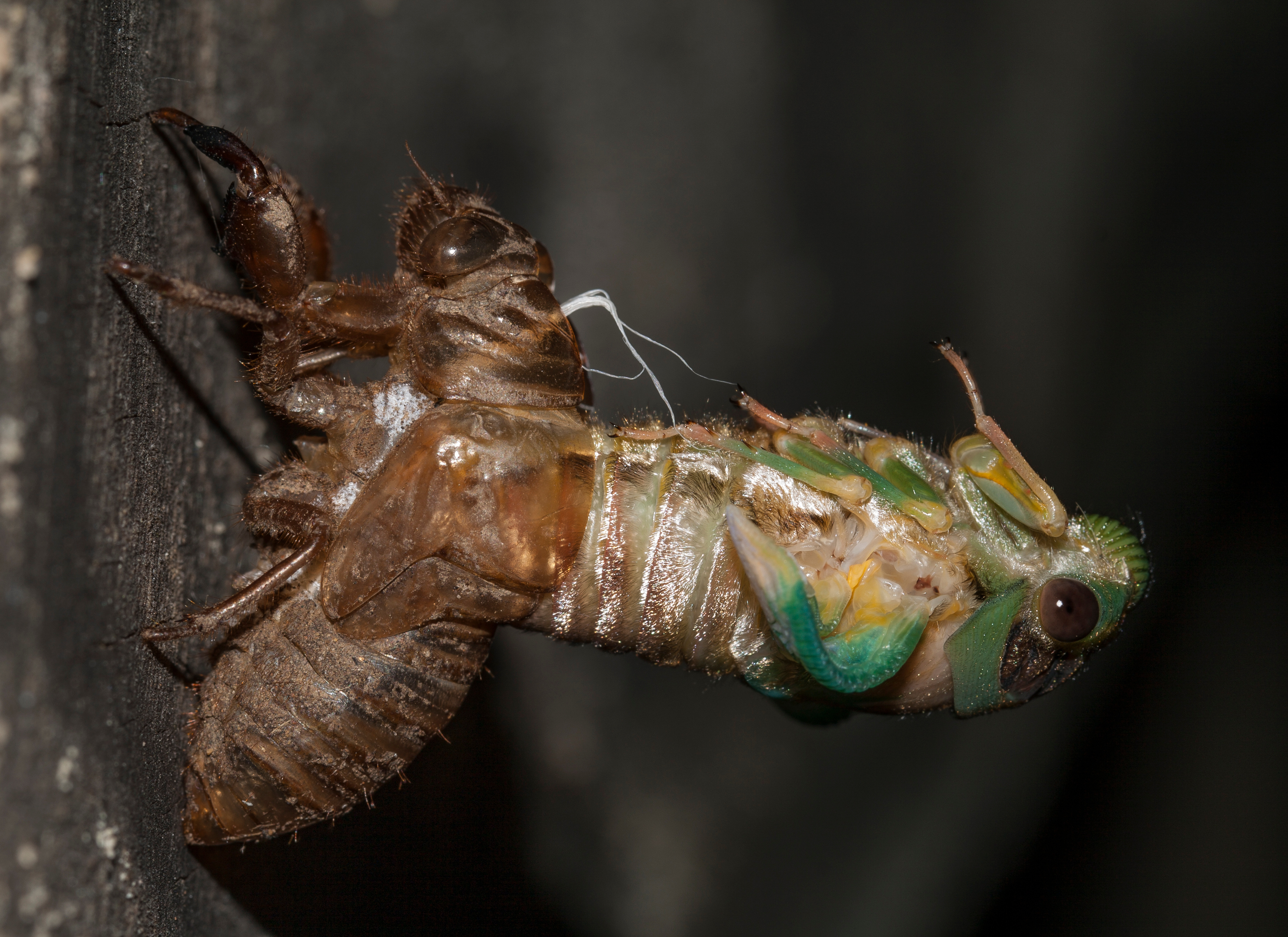
Arunta perulata female emerging from its exuvia

The white drummer was first described in 1831 by Félix Édouard Guérin-Méneville as Cicada perulata.

The average body length of the male white drummer is approximately 3.75 cm and the female approximately 3.72 cm. The head is green with prominent dark red-brown markings and green midline along pronotum. The eyes are a dark red-brown. The thorax and abdomen are predominantly dark red-brown. Depressions on the body are covered with yellow velvety fur. The prominent sac-like tymbal covers are white. The wings are clear with reddish brown and yellowish veins, and measure up to 4.97 cm long in males and 4.84 cm long in females. The white drummer has yellow-green legs marked with dark brown and black.

The white drummer make a constant rattle-like call, which can carry over long distances, singing during the day and at dusk. It consists of a series of pulses emitted by the cicada at a rate of 65 per second, with each lasting 2.5-3.5 microseconds followed by an interval of 14 microseconds. The frequency of the call is 5.5-6.5 kHz with a weak harmonic at 12 kHz. Like the related double drummer (Thopha saccata), its sac-like tymbal covers amplify its call.

The white drummer is found along Australia's eastern coastline from Cooktown in northern Queensland to Narooma in southern New South Wales. It has also been collected from far northern Cape York. The preferred habitat of the white drummer is swampy forest and mangroves, with the cicadas perching on trees such as sheoak (Casuarina equisetifolia), swamp oak (C. glauca), coast banksia (Banksia integrifolia) and coast wattle (Acacia sophorae). Adults appear in December and January.

Female cicadas lay eggs exclusively on live branches.
