= Tryella wuggubun =

Scientific classification
- Kingdom: Animalia
- Phylum: Arthropoda
- Clade: Pancrustacea
- Class: Insecta
- Order: Hemiptera
- Suborder: Auchenorrhyncha
- Family: Cicadidae
- Genus: Tryella
- Species: T. wuggubun

Binomial name
- Tryella wuggubun Emery, Emery, Hutchinson & Ong, 2022

Species of cicada

Tryella wuggubun is a species of cicada, also known as the Kimberley bullet, in the true cicada family, Cicadettinae subfamily and Lamotialnini tribe. The species is endemic to Australia. It was described in 2022 by Australian entomologists David L. Emery, Nathan J. Emery, Paul M. Hutchinson and Simon Ong.

== Etymology ==
The specific epithet wuggubun refers to, and honours, the Wuggubun people who occupy their traditional lands within the range of the species.

== Description ==
The length of the forewing is 15–22 mm.

== Distribution and habitat ==
The species occurs in the East Kimberley region of Western Australia, from Kununurra southwards to Halls Creek, and eastwards into adjacent parts of the Northern Territory. The associated habitat is tropical grassland.

== Behaviour ==
The cicadas are xylem feeders. Adult males may be heard from December to March, clinging to grass stems, emitting continuous rattling calls.
