= Tryella stalkeri =

Scientific classification
- Kingdom: Animalia
- Phylum: Arthropoda
- Clade: Pancrustacea
- Class: Insecta
- Order: Hemiptera
- Suborder: Auchenorrhyncha
- Family: Cicadidae
- Genus: Tryella
- Species: T. stalkeri

Binomial name
- Tryella stalkeri (Distant, 1907)

Synonyms
- Abricta stalkeri Distant, 1907

Species of cicada

Tryella stalkeri is a species of cicadas, also known as the honey bullet, in the true cicada family, Cicadettinae subfamily and Lamotialnini tribe. The species is endemic to Australia. It was described in 1907 by English entomologist William Lucas Distant.

== Description ==
The length of the forewing is 20–27 mm.

== Distribution and habitat ==
The species occurs in the Pilbara region of north-west Western Australia. The associated habitat is eucalypt woodland, especially along watercourses.

== Behaviour ==
The cicadas are xylem feeders. Adult males may be heard from December to March, clinging to the upper branches of eucalypts, emitting strong hissing calls.
