= Tryella occidens =

Scientific classification
- Kingdom: Animalia
- Phylum: Arthropoda
- Clade: Pancrustacea
- Class: Insecta
- Order: Hemiptera
- Suborder: Auchenorrhyncha
- Family: Cicadidae
- Genus: Tryella
- Species: T. occidens

Binomial name
- Tryella occidens Moulds, 2003

Species of cicada

Tryella occidens is a species of cicada, also known as the dusty brown bullet, in the true cicada family, Cicadettinae subfamily and Lamotialnini tribe. The species is endemic to Australia. It was described in 2003 by Australian entomologist Maxwell Sydney Moulds.

== Etymology ==
The specific epithet occidens, Latin for “towards the setting sun” or “west”, refers to the extreme western distribution of the species in Australia.

== Description ==
The length of the forewing is 25–30 mm. Body length is 19–24 mm.

== Distribution and habitat ==
The species occurs in coastal and inland areas of north-west Western Australia, from Carnarvon northwards to Port Hedland. The associated habitat is open woodland and shrubland.

== Behaviour ==
The cicadas are xylem feeders. Adult males may be heard from January to May, clinging to the stems and branches of trees and shrubs, emitting clean hissing calls.
