= Tryella noctua =

Scientific classification
- Kingdom: Animalia
- Phylum: Arthropoda
- Clade: Pancrustacea
- Class: Insecta
- Order: Hemiptera
- Suborder: Auchenorrhyncha
- Family: Cicadidae
- Genus: Tryella
- Species: T. noctua

Binomial name
- Tryella noctua (Distant, 1913)

Synonyms
- Abricta noctua Distant, 1913; Abricta rufonigra Ashton, 1914

Species of cicada

Tryella noctua is a species of cicada, also known as the chocolate bullet, in the true cicada family, Cicadettinae subfamily and Lamotialnini tribe. The species is endemic to Australia. It was described in 1913 by English entomologist William Lucas Distant.

== Etymology ==
The specific epithet noctua comes from the Latin for a small owl.

== Description ==
The length of the forewing is 19–26 mm.

== Distribution and habitat ==
The species occurs in arid areas, from central Western Australia eastwards to the south-western Northern Territory, and adjacent north-western South Australia, to Coober Pedy. The associated habitat is mulga shrubland.

== Behaviour ==
The cicadas are xylem feeders. Adult males may be heard from December to March, clinging to the stems of mulga and similar shrubs, emitting strident hissing calls during the day and at dusk.
