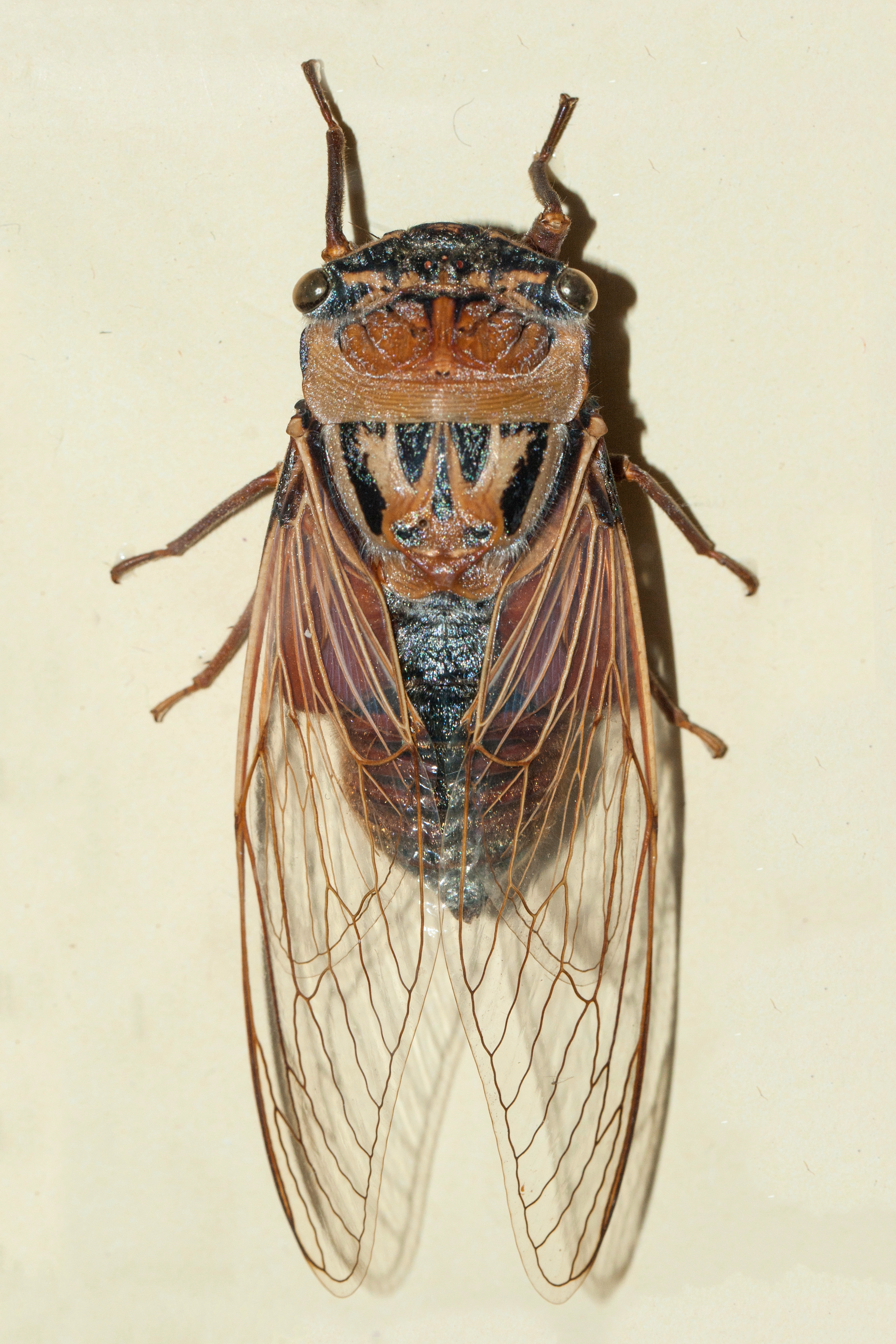
- T. saccata male specimen on display at the Australian Museum

Scientific classification
- Kingdom: Animalia
- Phylum: Arthropoda
- Clade: Pancrustacea
- Class: Insecta
- Order: Hemiptera
- Suborder: Auchenorrhyncha
- Family: Cicadidae
- Genus: Thopha
- Species: T. saccata

Binomial name
- Thopha saccata (Fabricius, 1803)
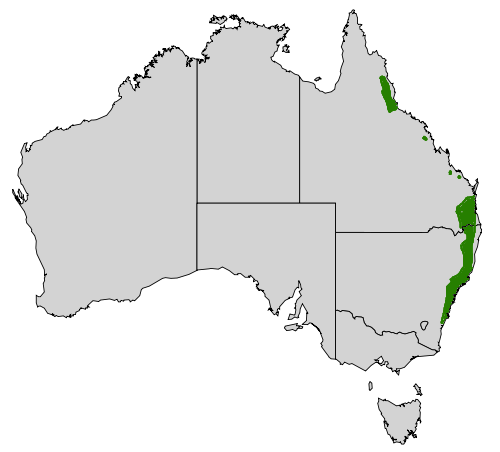
- Thopha saccata range

Synonyms
- Tettigonia saccata Fabricius, 1803; Cicada saccata (Fabricius, 1803)

= Thopha saccata =

Australian species of cicada

Thopha saccata, the double drummer, is the largest Australian species of cicada and reputedly the loudest insect in the world. Documented by the Danish zoologist Johan Christian Fabricius in 1803, it was the first described and named cicada native to Australia. Its common name comes from the large dark red-brown sac-like pockets that the adult male has on each side of its abdomen—the "double drums"—that are used to amplify the sound it produces.

Broad-headed compared with other cicadas, the double drummer is mostly brown with a black pattern across the back of its thorax, and has red-brown and black underparts. The sexes are similar in appearance, though the female lacks the male's tymbals and sac-like covers. Found in sclerophyll forest in Queensland and New South Wales, adult double drummers generally perch high in the branches of large eucalypts. They emerge from the ground where they have spent several years as nymphs from November until March, and live for another four to five weeks. They appear in great numbers in some years, yet are absent in others.

== Taxonomy ==
Danish naturalist Johan Christian Fabricius described the double drummer as Tettigonia saccata in 1803, the first description of an Australian cicada. The type locality was inexplicably and incorrectly recorded as China. It was placed in the new genus Thopha by French entomologists Charles Jean-Baptiste Amyot and Jean Guillaume Audinet-Serville in their 1843 work Histoire naturelle des insectes Hemipteres ("Natural History of Hemiptera Insects"). The generic name is derived from thoph (Hebrew: תּוֹף), meaning "drum". They maintained it as native to China. The specific name is derived from the Latin saccus, meaning "sac" or "bag", and more specifically "moneybag".

In 1838, Félix Édouard Guérin-Méneville pointed out that the double drummer is native to Australia and not China. John Obadiah Westwood designated it the type species of the genus in 1843, and it is also the type species for the tribe Thophini. The common name is derived from the male cicada's sac-like tymbal covers ("drums") on either side of its abdomen.

== Description ==
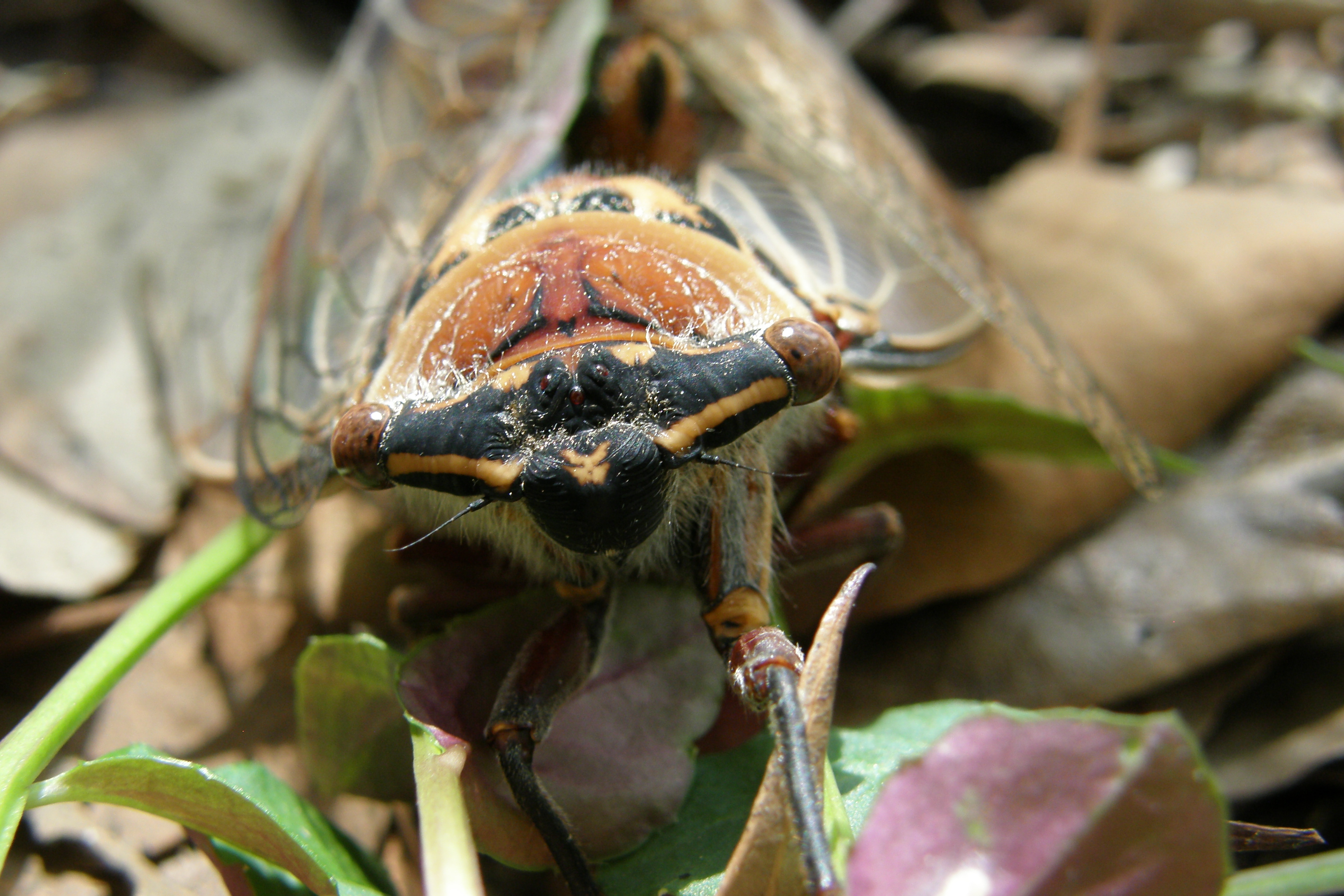
Face on, showing small red ocelli and eyes – southeast Queensland

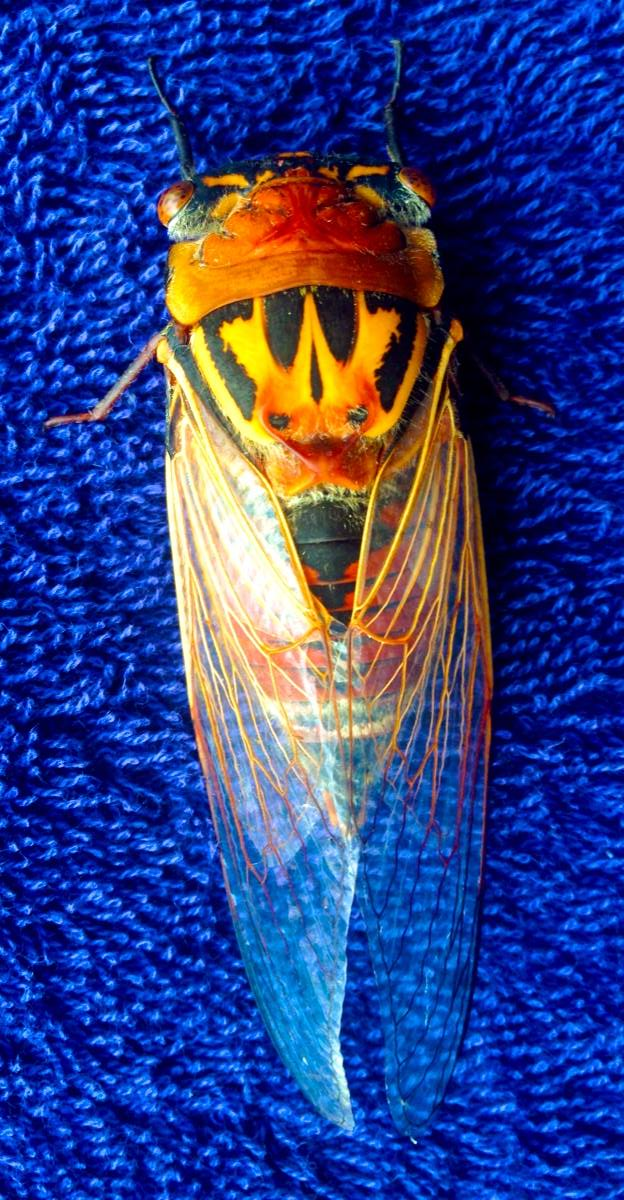
Female T. saccata on carpet

The adult double drummer is the largest Australian species of cicada, the male and female averaging 4.75 and 5.12 cm (1.87 and 2.02 in) long respectively. The thorax is 2 cm (0.79 in) in diameter, its sides distended when compared with the thorax of other Australian cicadas. The forewings are 5–6.6 cm (2.0–2.6 in) long. The largest collected specimen has a wingspan of 15.1 cm (5.9 in), while the average is 13.3 cm (5.2 in). The average mass is 4.0 g (0.14 oz). The sexes have similar markings, but males have large dark red-brown sac-like structures on each side of their abdomens. These cover the tymbals—specialised structures composed of vertical ribs and a tymbal plate, which is buckled to produce the cicada's song. The head is much broader than that of other cicadas, and is broader than the pronotum behind it. The head, antennae and postclypeus are black, with a narrow broken pale brown transverse band across the vertex just behind the ocelli. The eyes are black in young adult cicadas upon emerging, but turn brown with black pseudopupils at the posterior edge of the eye. The ocelli are deep red. The proboscis is 1.26 cm (0.50 in) in length—very long compared with other Australian cicada species. The thorax is brown, becoming paler in older individuals. The pronotum is rusty brown with black anterior borders, while the mesonotum is a little paler with prominent black markings, with paired cone-shaped spots with bases towards the front on either side of a median stripe; lateral to these spots are a pair of markings resembling a "7" on the right hand side of the mesonotum and its reverse on the left. The abdomen is black between the tymbal covers and red-brown and black more posteriorly. The underparts of the double drummer are red-brown and black, and covered in fine silvery velvety hairs. The female's ovipositor is very long, measuring 1.76 cm (0.69 in). The wings are vitreous (transparent) with light brown veins. The legs are dark brown and have grey velvety hairs.

There is little variation in colour over its range, though occasional females are darker overall than average, with markings less prominent or absent. The double drummer is larger and darker overall than the northern double drummer (T. sessiliba); the latter has a white band on the abdomen, while the former has black markings on the leading edge (costa) of the forewing extending past the basal cell.

Male cicadas make a noise to attract females, which has been described as "the sound of summer". The song of the double drummer is extremely loud—reportedly the loudest sound of any insect—and can reach an earsplitting volume in excess of 120 dB if there are large numbers of double drummers at close range. Monotonous and dronelike, the song is said to resemble high-pitched bagpipes. The sound of the buckling of the tymbal plate then resonates in an adjacent hollow chamber in the abdomen, as well as in the exterior air-filled sacs, which act as Helmholtz resonators.

Singing can cease and restart suddenly, either rarely or frequently, and often ends abruptly. The song has been described as "Tar-ran-tar-rar-tar-ran-tar-rar", and consists of a series of pulses emitted at a rate of 240–250 a second. The tymbal covers are much larger than other species and also make the call louder and send it in a particular direction. There are two distinct phases of song, which the double drummer switches between at irregular intervals. One phase is a continuous call that can last for several minutes; during this period the frequency varies between 5.5 and 6.2 kHz and 6.0–7.5 kHz 4–6 times a second. In the other phase, the song is interrupted by breaks of increasing frequency resulting in a staccato sound. These breaks can be mistaken for silence as the difference in volume is so great, though the song actually continues at a much lower volume. During this staccato phase, which lasts for several seconds, the frequency remains around 5.75–6.5 kHz. The frequency of the song is a high harmonic of the pulse repetition frequency, which makes for a particularly ringing sound. Double drummers congregate in groups to amplify their calls, which likely drives off potential bird predators. Male double drummers also emit a distress call—a sharp fragmented irregular noise—upon being seized by a predator.

== Life cycle ==
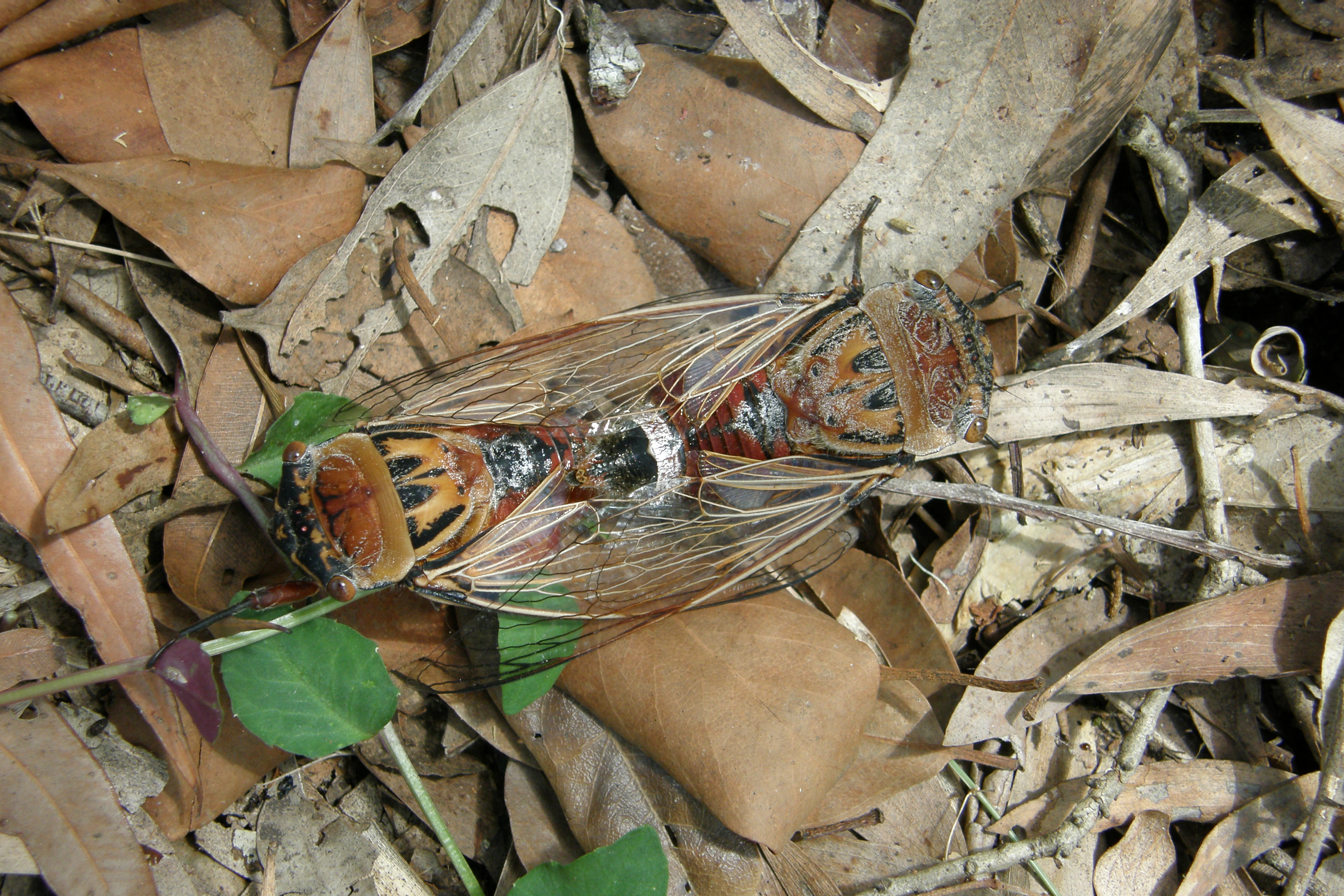
Pair of mating double drummers, Southeast Queensland

The narrow spindle-shaped eggs are laid in a series of slits cut by the mother's ovipositor in branches or twigs, usually of eucalypts. On average about twelve eggs are laid in each slit, for a total of several hundred. These cuts can cause significant damage to the bark of tender trees. The eggs all hatch around 70 days later—usually within a day or two of one another—but take longer in cold or dry conditions. The larvae then fall to the ground and burrow into the soil. Though the timing of the double drummer's life cycle is unknown, nymphs of cicadas in general then spend from four to six years underground. Unusual for Australian cicadas, double drummers emerge during the daytime. Emerging en masse generally, nymphs are covered in mud. This mud remains on their exuviae, which emerging cicadas leave at the bases or in burnt out hollows of eucalypts. Within a forest, successive broods may emerge in different locations each year. The cicada's body and wings desiccate and harden once free of the exuvia.

The adult lifespan of the double drummer is about four or five weeks. During this time, they mate and reproduce, and feed exclusively on sap of living trees, sucking it out through specialised mouthparts. Female cicadas die after laying their eggs.

== Distribution and habitat ==
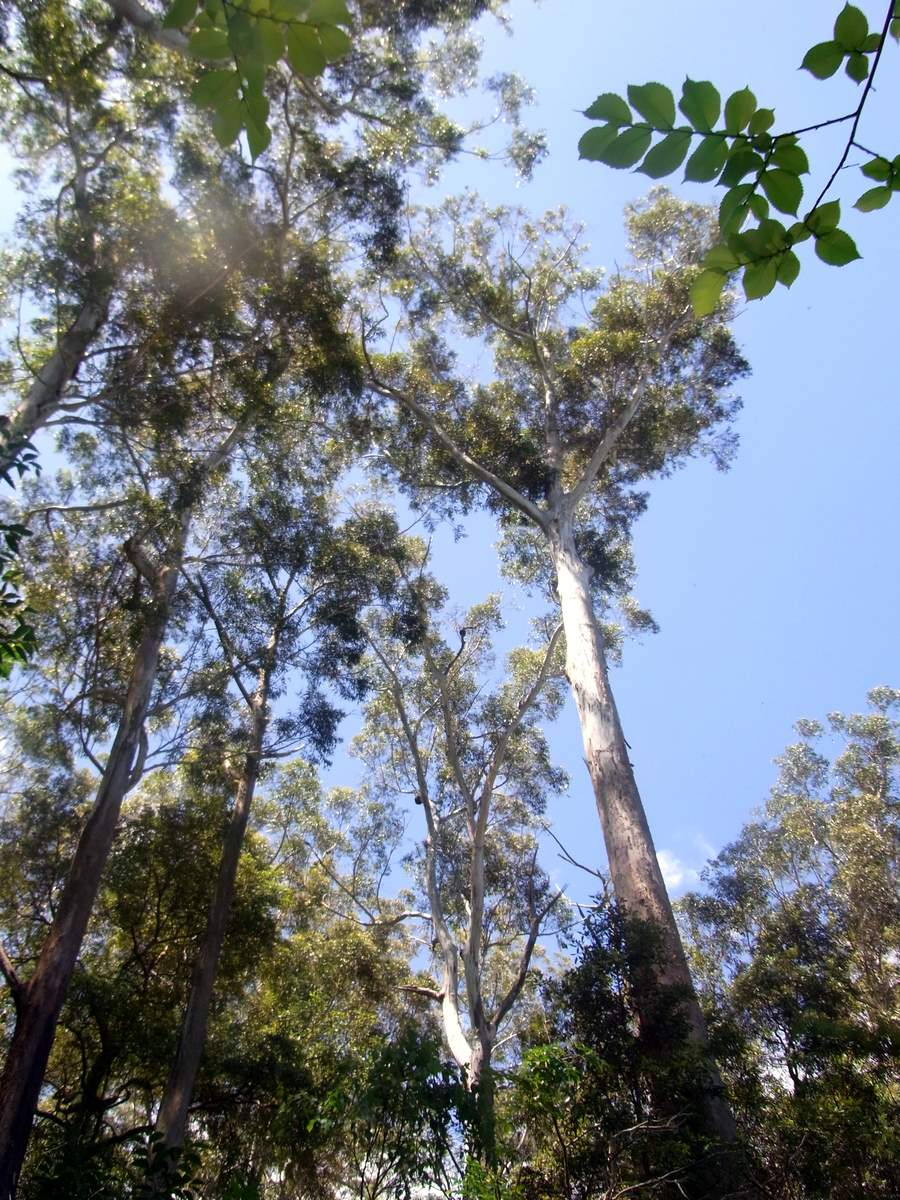
Blackbutt (Eucalyptus pilularis) in sclerophyll forest, Sydney

The double drummer has a disjunct distribution, found from northern tropical Queensland, near Shiptons Flat and Cooktown south to Ingham and Sarina, and then from Gympie in southeastern Queensland to Moruya in southern New South Wales. It is found in areas of higher elevation in the northern segment of its range, as the climate there is similar to that in southeast Queensland. Walter Wilson Froggatt and Robert John Tillyard erroneously included South Australia in its distribution.

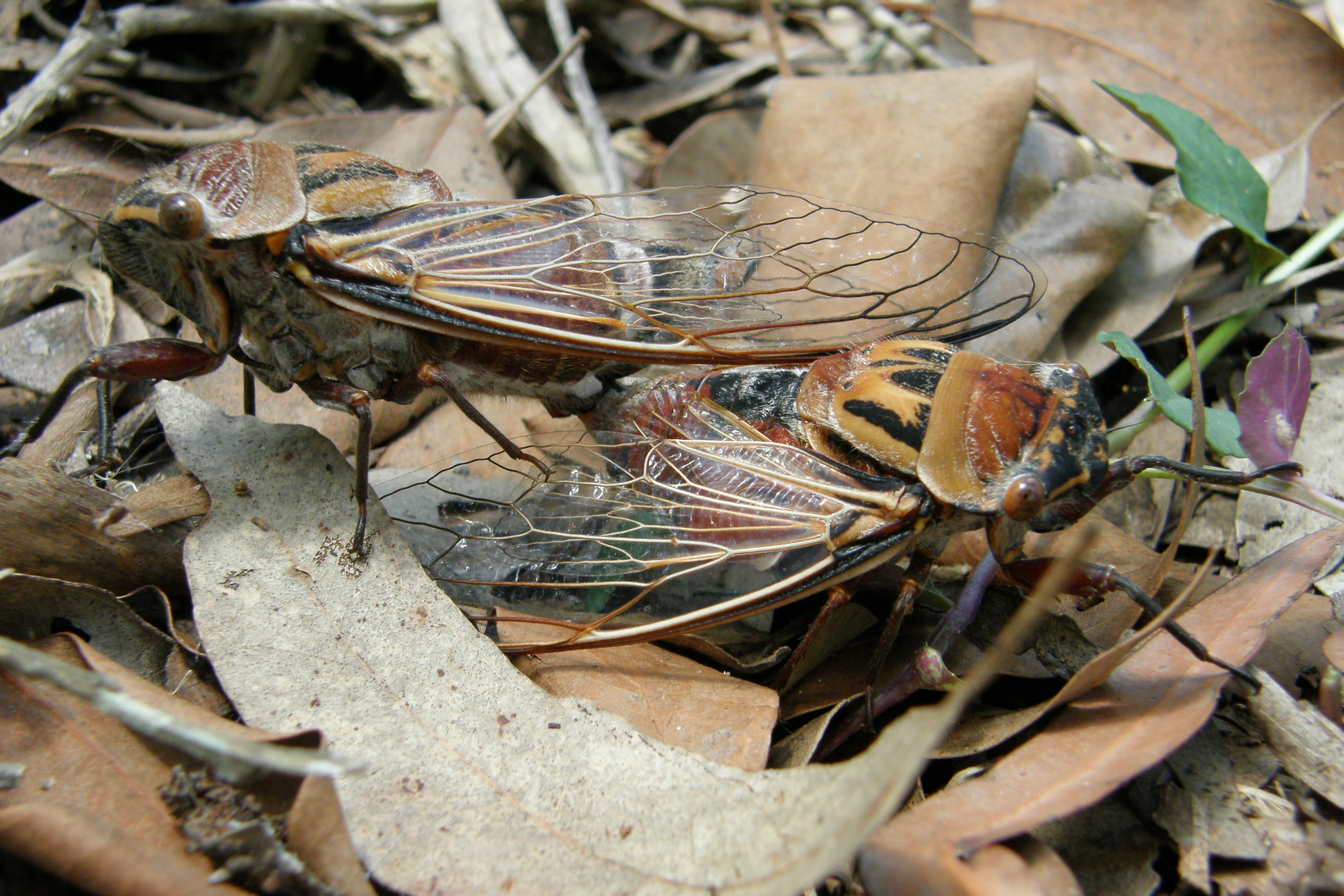
Female T. saccata (behind, left) male (front, right)

Adults are present from November to early March, prolific in some years and absent in others. They are found in dry sclerophyll forest, preferring to alight and feed on large eucalypts with diameters over 20 cm (7.9 in) and sparse foliage concentrated at a height between 10 and 25 m (33 and 82 ft), particularly rough-barked species, apples (Angophora) and Tristania. Associated trees include the grey box (Eucalyptus moluccana), snappy gum (E. racemosa) and narrow-leaved apple (Angophora bakeri) in a study at three sites in western Sydney. At Hawks Nest in coastal swampy sclerophyll woodland, adults were observed mainly on swamp mahogany (Eucalyptus robusta) and sometimes blackbutt (E. pilularis), as well as Allocasuarina littoralis and introduced pine (Pinus radiata). Nymphs feed primarily on the roots of eucalypts.

The double drummer has not adapted well to city life; distribution of the species in cities is limited to natural stands of large trees.

== Behaviour ==
In hotter weather, double drummers perch on the upper branches of trees, while on overcast or rainy days, they may be found lower down on trunks near the ground. Double drummers on tree trunks are skittish, and can fly off en masse if disturbed. Relative to other Australian cicadas they have excellent perception, fly at a moderate cruising speed of 2.5 m/s (8.2 ft/s), with a similarly moderate maximum speed of 4.0 m/s (13 ft/s), and are exceptionally adept at landing. The double drummer has been known to fly out to sea, effectively on a one-way trip as their bodies have later been found washed up on beaches. A swarm of double drummers were reported 8 km (5.0 mi) off the coast of Sussex Inlet in January 1979, in and around the boat of a local fisherman.

== Predation ==
As the adult cicadas emerge in the daytime, large numbers are consumed by birds. Thopha cicadas have also been found in the stomachs of foxes. The double drummer is one of the large cicada species preyed on by the cicada killer wasp (Exeirus lateritius), which stings and paralyses cicadas high in the trees. Their victims drop to the ground where the cicada-hunter mounts and carries them, pushing with its hind legs, sometimes over a distance of 100 m (330 ft). They are then shoved into the hunter's burrow, where the helpless cicada is placed on a shelf in an often extensive "catacomb", to form food-stock for the wasp grub growing from the eggs deposited within.

== Interactions with humans ==
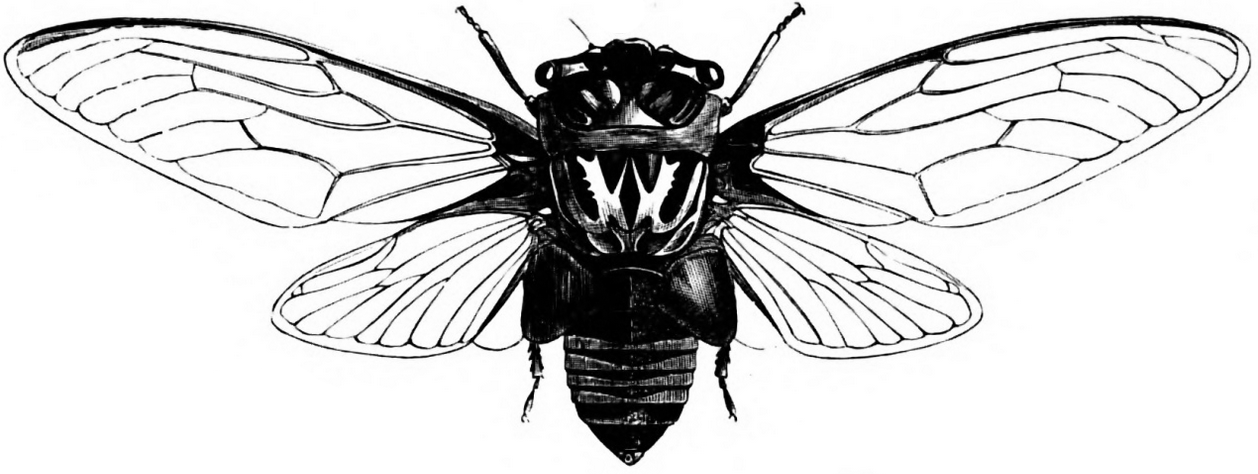
This illustration of Thopha saccata appeared in the 1885 Elementary Text-book of Entomology by William Forsell Kirby.

Schoolchildren climb trees to collect live cicadas and keep them as pets in shoeboxes. However, they cannot easily be kept for longer than a day or two, given that they need flowing sap for food. Live adults brought into classrooms by their captors would startle the class with their piercing sound. Poems dedicated to the double drummer appeared in the Catholic Press in 1933 and 1936, describing bird predation and its life cycle to children.

== See also ==
- List of cicadas of Australia
