= Tryella fumipennis =

Scientific classification
- Kingdom: Animalia
- Phylum: Arthropoda
- Clade: Pancrustacea
- Class: Insecta
- Order: Hemiptera
- Suborder: Auchenorrhyncha
- Family: Cicadidae
- Genus: Tryella
- Species: T. fumipennis

Binomial name
- Tryella fumipennis Emery, Emery, Hutchinson & Ong, 2022

Species of cicada

Tryella fumipennis is a species of cicada, also known as the smoky-winged bullet, in the true cicada family, Cicadettinae subfamily and Lamotialnini tribe. The species is endemic to Australia. It was described in 2022 by Australian entomologists David L. Emery, Nathan J. Emery, Paul M. Hutchinson and Simon Ong.

== Etymology ==
The specific epithet fumipennis, Latin for “smoky wing”, refers to the smoky infusions on the distal half of the forewing.

== Description ==
The length of the forewing is 20–24 mm.

== Distribution and habitat ==
The species occurs in the Pilbara region of Western Australia. The associated habitat is low woodland and open shrubland.

== Behaviour ==
The cicadas are xylem feeders. Adult males may be heard from February to March.
