= Tryella rubra =

Scientific classification
- Kingdom: Animalia
- Phylum: Arthropoda
- Clade: Pancrustacea
- Class: Insecta
- Order: Hemiptera
- Suborder: Auchenorrhyncha
- Family: Cicadidae
- Genus: Tryella
- Species: T. rubra

Binomial name
- Tryella rubra (Goding & Froggatt, 1904)

Synonyms
- Tibicen ruber Goding & Froggatt, 1904; Abricta elseyi Distant, 1905

Species of cicada

Tryella rubra is a species, or species complex, of cicadas, also known as large rusty bullets, in the true cicada family, Cicadettinae subfamily and Lamotialnini tribe. The species is endemic to Australia. It was described in 1904 by entomologists Frederic Webster Goding and Walter Wilson Froggatt.

== Etymology ==
The specific epithet rubra, from Latin “red”, refers to the cicadas’ colouration.

== Description ==
The length of the forewing is 24–30 mm.

== Distribution and habitat ==
The species complex occurs in the Top End of the Northern Territory and the adjacent Kimberley region of northern Western Australia. Associated habitats include riverine woodland, monsoonal woodland and parkland.

== Behaviour ==
Adult males may be heard from September to February, clinging to the main trunks, stems and branches of trees, emitting continuous hissing calls.
