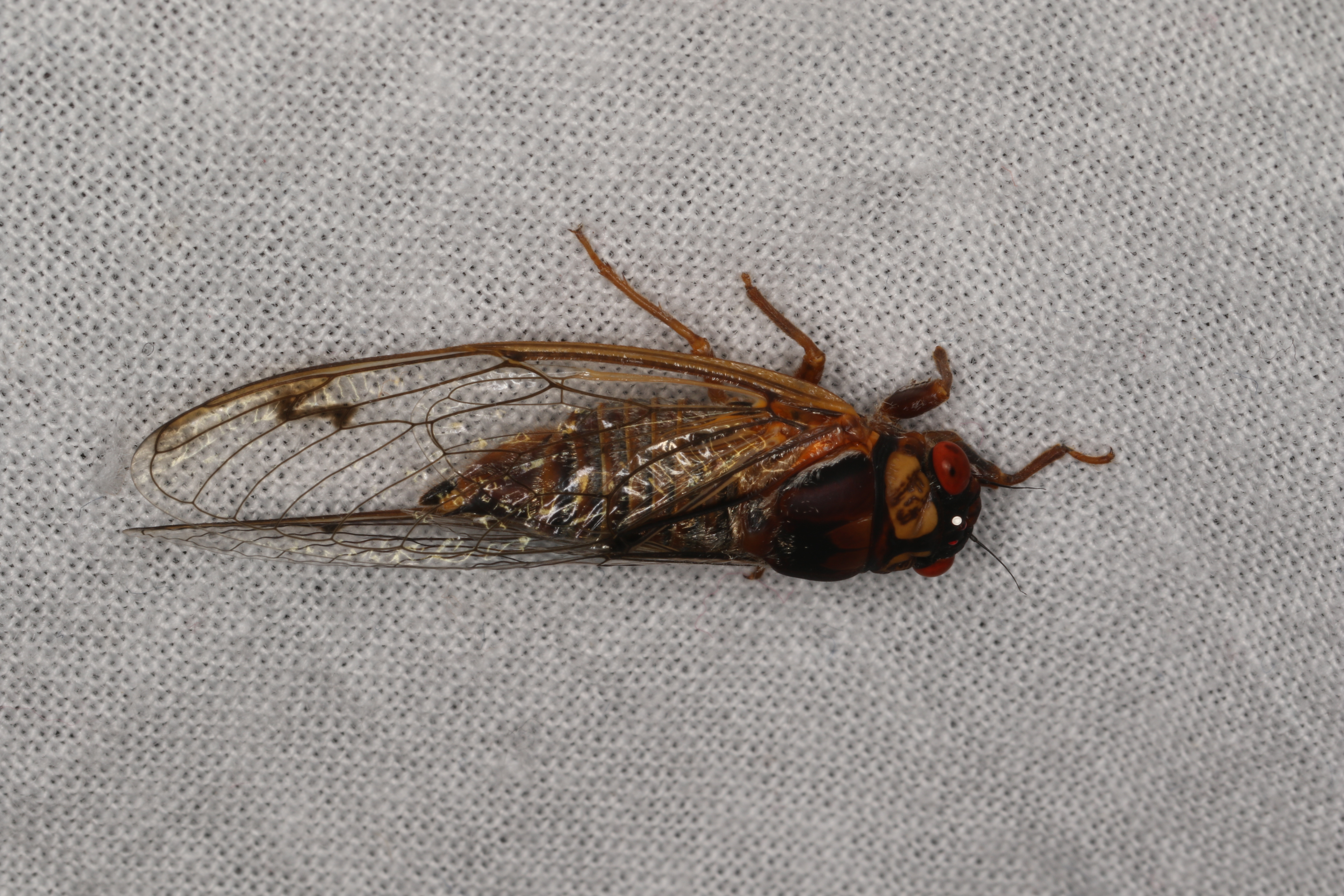

Scientific classification
- Kingdom: Animalia
- Phylum: Arthropoda
- Clade: Pancrustacea
- Class: Insecta
- Order: Hemiptera
- Suborder: Auchenorrhyncha
- Family: Cicadidae
- Genus: Tryella
- Species: T. burnsi

Binomial name
- Tryella burnsi Moulds, 2003

= Tryella burnsi =

Species of cicada

Tryella burnsi is a species of cicada, also known as the brown bullet, in the true cicada family, Cicadettinae subfamily and Lamotialnini tribe. The species is endemic to Australia. It was described in 2003 by Australian entomologist Maxwell Sydney Moulds.

== Etymology ==
The specific epithet burnsi honours Alex Burns, who wrote several papers on Australian cicadas.

== Description ==
The length of the forewing is 20–27 mm. Body length is 15–22 mm.

== Distribution and habitat ==
The species occurs in coastal and inland areas of tropical eastern Queensland from the Cape York Peninsula southwards to Gladstone. The associated habitat is tropical bushland and woodland.

== Behaviour ==
The cicadas are xylem feeders. Adult males may be heard from October to March, clinging to the stems of trees and shrubs, emitting wavering hissing calls.
