= Tryella lachlani =

Scientific classification
- Kingdom: Animalia
- Phylum: Arthropoda
- Clade: Pancrustacea
- Class: Insecta
- Order: Hemiptera
- Suborder: Auchenorrhyncha
- Family: Cicadidae
- Genus: Tryella
- Species: T. lachlani

Binomial name
- Tryella lachlani Moulds, 2003

Species of cicada

Tryella lachlani is a species of cicada, also known as the golden black bullet, in the true cicada family, Cicadettinae subfamily and Lamotialnini tribe. The species is native to Australia and New Guinea. It was described in 2003 by Australian entomologist Maxwell Sydney Moulds.

== Etymology ==
The specific epithet lachlani honours Robert Lachlan, who collected many rare and valuable cicadas, including early examples of this species.

== Description ==
The length of the forewing is 22–27 mm. Body length is 15–20 mm.

== Distribution and habitat ==
The species occurs in Far North Queensland on the Cape York Peninsula and Torres Strait Islands, as well as on the mainland of New Guinea. The associated habitat is tropical woodland dominated by tea-trees.

== Behaviour ==
The cicadas are xylem feeders. Adult males may be heard from December to January, clinging to the stems and branches of tea-trees, emitting soft hissing calls.
