= Tryella kauma =

Scientific classification
- Kingdom: Animalia
- Phylum: Arthropoda
- Clade: Pancrustacea
- Class: Insecta
- Order: Hemiptera
- Suborder: Auchenorrhyncha
- Family: Cicadidae
- Genus: Tryella
- Species: T. kauma

Binomial name
- Tryella kauma Moulds, 2003

Species of cicada

Tryella kauma is a species of cicada, also known as the whispering bullet, in the true cicada family, Cicadettinae subfamily and Lamotialnini tribe. The species is endemic to Australia. It was described in 2003 by Australian entomologist Maxwell Sydney Moulds.

== Etymology ==
The specific epithet kauma, from Greek: “burning heat”, refers to the climatic conditions in the area where the species was discovered.

== Description ==
The length of the forewing is 15–21 mm. Body length is 12–17 mm.

== Distribution and habitat ==
The species occurs in northern Queensland from near Burketown and Normanton eastwards to Mount Surprise and near Laura. The associated habitat is tropical open woodland.

== Behaviour ==
The cicadas are xylem feeders. Adult males may be heard from December to January, clinging to the stems of trees and shrubs, emitting soft hissing calls.
