= Tryella infuscata =

Scientific classification
- Kingdom: Animalia
- Phylum: Arthropoda
- Clade: Pancrustacea
- Class: Insecta
- Order: Hemiptera
- Suborder: Auchenorrhyncha
- Family: Cicadidae
- Genus: Tryella
- Species: T. infuscata

Binomial name
- Tryella infuscata Moulds, 2003

Species of cicada

Tryella infuscata is a species of cicada, also known as the large maroon bullet, in the true cicada family, Cicadettinae subfamily and Lamotialnini tribe. The species is endemic to Australia. It was described in 2003 by Australian entomologist Maxwell Sydney Moulds.

== Etymology ==
The specific epithet infuscata comes from Latin (“obscured” or “darkened”), with reference to the infuscations on the forewings of the species.

== Description ==
The length of the forewing is 22–27 mm. Body length is 17–23 mm.

== Distribution and habitat ==
The species occurs from east of Harts Range in the east of the Northern Territory eastwards to the south of Normanton, near the Gulf of Carpentaria, in north-western Queensland. The associated habitat is open tropical woodland.

== Behaviour ==
The cicadas are xylem feeders. Adult males may be heard in January and February, clinging to the upper branches of trees, emitting strong hissing calls.
