= Panka =

Panka may refer to:

- Mindaugas Panka (born 1984), Lithuanian footballer
- Panka Pelishek (1899–1990), Bulgarian pianist and music teacher
- Panka, Ukraine, a village in Ukraine
- Panka prabha, in Jainism, the hell of mud, see Naraka (Jainism)
- Páⁿka, the autonym of the Ponca people, a Native American tribe
- *pank'a, in Persian units of measurement, one pace, approximately 1.5 meters (5 feet)
- Pankha, Hindu for the punkah, a type of fan
- Alternative spelling for the Panika, community of India
- Panka (cicada), a genus of cicadas

== See also ==
- Pankaj, given name
