= Tryella adela =

Scientific classification
- Kingdom: Animalia
- Phylum: Arthropoda
- Clade: Pancrustacea
- Class: Insecta
- Order: Hemiptera
- Suborder: Auchenorrhyncha
- Family: Cicadidae
- Genus: Tryella
- Species: T. adela

Binomial name
- Tryella adela Moulds, 2003

Species of cicada

Tryella adela is a species of cicada, also known as the small maroon bullet, in the true cicada family, Cicadettinae subfamily and Lamotialnini tribe. The species is endemic to Australia. It was described in 2003 by Australian entomologist Maxwell Sydney Moulds.

== Etymology ==
The specific epithet adela comes from Greek άδηλος (uncertain, unknown or dubious), with reference to the small size and apparent scarcity of the species.

== Description ==
The length of the forewing is 16–21 mm. Body length is 12–15 mm.

== Distribution and habitat ==
The species occurs in the Top End of the Northern Territory from the south-western edge of Arnhem Land westwards to Katherine and southwards to Daly Waters. The associated habitat is open woodland.

== Behaviour ==
The cicadas are xylem feeders. Adult males may be heard in November and December, clinging to the stems of trees and shrubs, emitting hissing calls.
