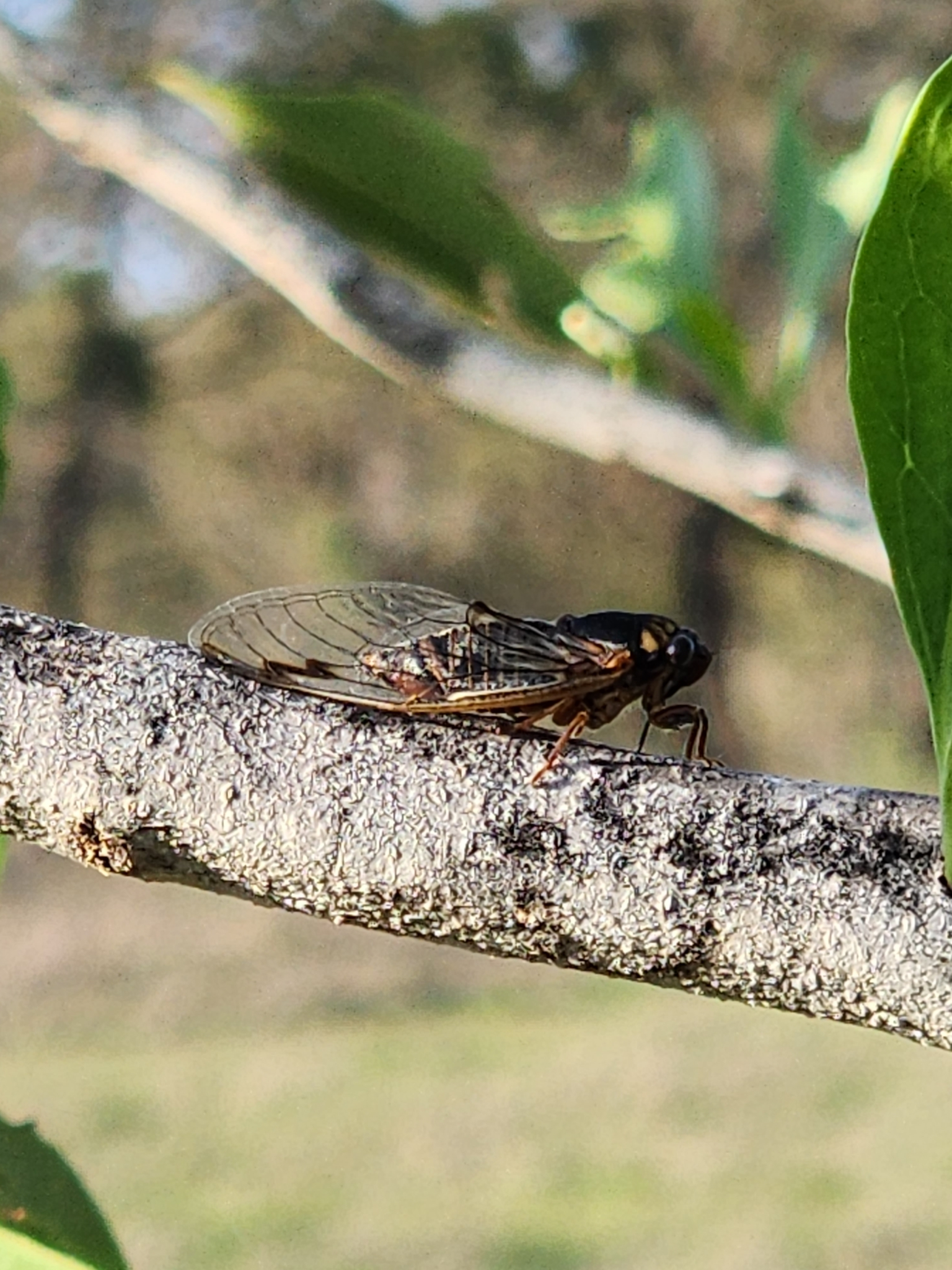

Scientific classification
- Kingdom: Animalia
- Phylum: Arthropoda
- Clade: Pancrustacea
- Class: Insecta
- Order: Hemiptera
- Suborder: Auchenorrhyncha
- Family: Cicadidae
- Genus: Tryella
- Species: T. willsi

Binomial name
- Tryella willsi (Distant, 1882)

Synonyms
- Tibicen willsi Distant, 1882

= Tryella willsi =

Species of cicada

Tryella willsi is a species of cicada, also known as the black bullet or black buzzing bullet, in the true cicada family, Cicadettinae subfamily and Lamotialnini tribe. The species is endemic to Australia. It was described in 1882 by English entomologist William Lucas Distant.

== Description ==
The length of the forewing is 20–27 mm.

== Distribution and habitat ==
The species occurs from Gunpowder and Cloncurry in north-western Queensland, south-eastwards to Rockhampton and Theodore, and southwards to Bourke in northern New South Wales. Associated habitats include open woodland and semi-arid shrublands.

== Behaviour ==
The cicadas are xylem feeders. Adult males may be heard from October to March, clinging upside-down to the branches and stems of trees and shrubs, emitting long, high-pitched, hissing calls.
