= Tryella crassa =

Scientific classification
- Kingdom: Animalia
- Phylum: Arthropoda
- Clade: Pancrustacea
- Class: Insecta
- Order: Hemiptera
- Suborder: Auchenorrhyncha
- Family: Cicadidae
- Genus: Tryella
- Species: T. crassa

Binomial name
- Tryella crassa Moulds, 2003

Species of cicada

Tryella crassa is a species of cicada, also known as the dusky bullet, in the true cicada family, Cicadettinae subfamily and Lamotialnini tribe. The species is endemic to Australia. It was described in 2003 by Australian entomologist Maxwell Sydney Moulds.

== Etymology ==
The specific epithet crassa comes from Latin crassus (thick or fat), with reference to the stocky build of the species.

== Description ==
The length of the forewing is 20–31 mm. Body length is 15–25 mm.

== Distribution and habitat ==
The species occurs from the north-western Northern Territory eastwards through north-western Queensland to Charters Towers and southwards to near the Cape River. The associated habitat is open grassland with scattered trees and shrubs.

== Behaviour ==
The cicadas are xylem feeders. Adult males may be heard while clinging to the stems of low shrubs, emitting loud wavering calls.
