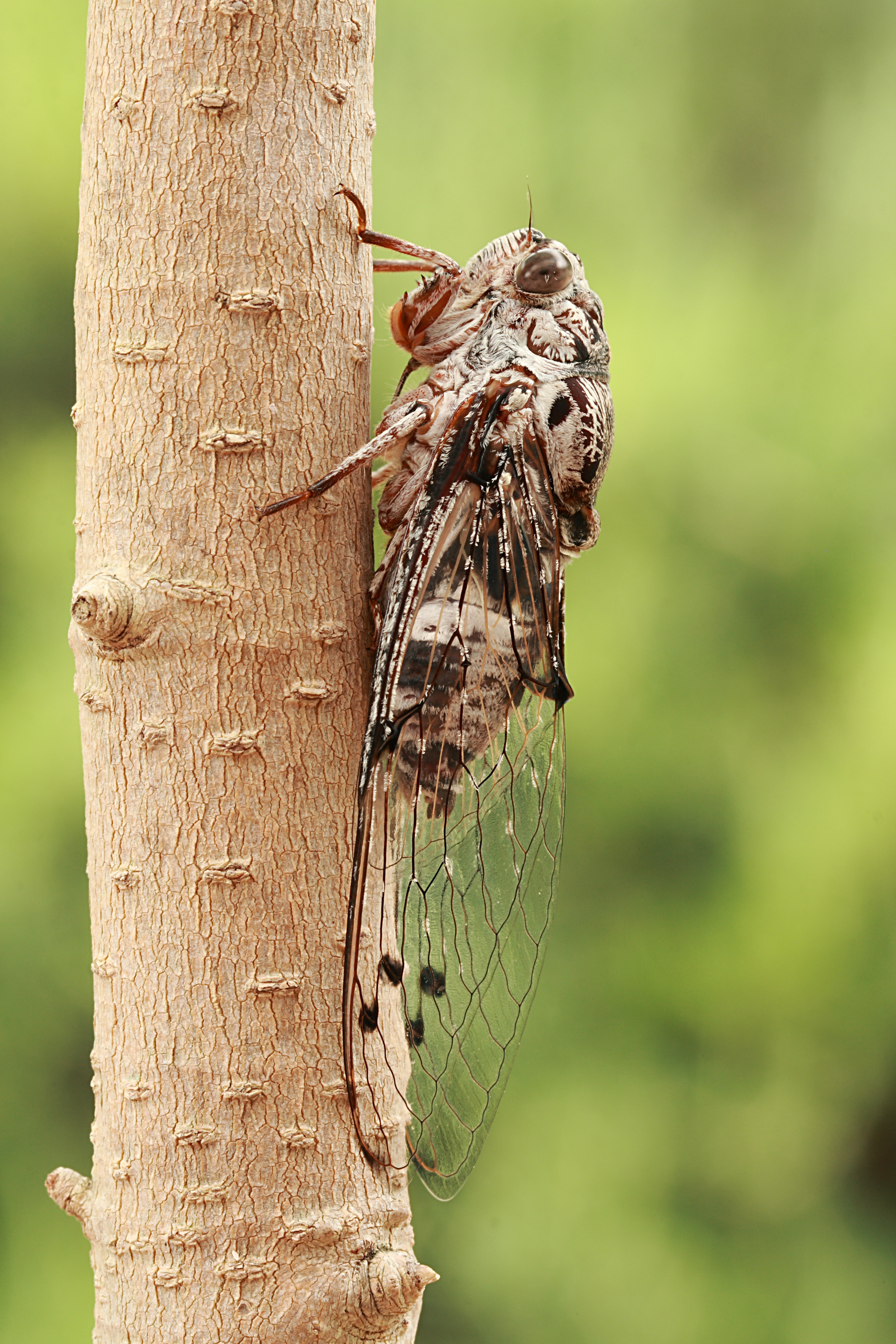

Scientific classification
- Kingdom: Animalia
- Phylum: Arthropoda
- Clade: Pancrustacea
- Class: Insecta
- Order: Hemiptera
- Suborder: Auchenorrhyncha
- Family: Cicadidae
- Subfamily: Cicadettinae
- Tribe: Lamotialnini
- Genus: Aleeta; Moulds, 2003
- Species: A. curvicosta

Binomial name
- Aleeta curvicosta (Germar, 1834)
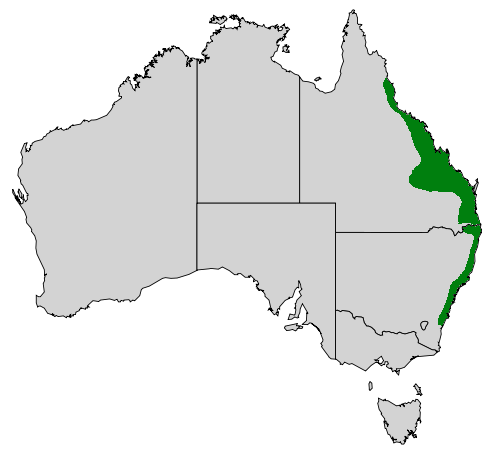
- Aleeta curvicosta range

Synonyms
- Cicada curvicosta Germar, 1834; Tibicen curvicostus (Germar, 1834); Tibicina curvicosta (Germar, 1834); Abricta curvicosta (Germar, 1834); Cicada tephrogaster Boisduval, 1835; Tibicen (Abricta) tephrogaster (Boisduval, 1835)

= Aleeta =

Species of insect

Aleeta is a monotypic genus of cicadas containing the species Aleeta curvicosta (commonly known as the floury baker or floury miller, known until 2003 as Abricta curvicosta), one of Australia's most familiar insects. Native to the continent's eastern coastline, it was described in 1834 by Ernst Friedrich Germar.

The floury baker's distinctive appearance and loud call make it popular with children. Both the common and genus name are derived from the white, flour-like filaments covering the adult body. Its body and eyes are generally brown with pale patterns including a light-coloured line along the midline of the pronotum. Its forewings have distinctive dark brown patches at the base of two of their apical cells. The female is larger than the male, although species size overall varies geographically, with larger animals associated with regions of higher rainfall. The male has distinctive genitalia and a loud and complex call generated by the frequent buckling of ribbed tymbals and amplified by abdominal air sacs.

The floury baker is solitary and occurs in low densities. Individuals typically emerge from the soil through a three-month period from late November to late February, and can be encountered until May. The floury baker is found on a wide variety of trees, with some preference for species of paperbark (Melaleuca). It is a relatively poor flier, preyed upon by cicada killer wasps and a wide variety of birds, and can succumb to a cicada-specific fungal disease.

== Taxonomy ==
German naturalist Ernst Friedrich Germar described the floury baker in 1834 as Cicada curvicosta. Germar based the description on two specimens now in the Hope Entomological Collections, Oxford, but did not designate a type specimen and their exact locations were not recorded. In 2003, one of the original specimens was designated the lectotype and the other the paralectotype.

Prominent Swedish entomologist Carl Stål named the genus Abricta in 1866, and it was either treated as a subgenus of the genus Tibicen or a genus in its own right. Thus it became known as Tibicen curvicostus, and Abricta curvicosta from 1906. French entomologist Jean Baptiste Boisduval described two specimens collected from Port Jackson as Cicada tephrogaster (later Tibicen tephrogaster) in 1835; this has long been considered a junior synonym. However, a review of the genus in 2003 showed Abricta to be a disparate group of species, and the Australian members were moved to other genera. Max Moulds conducted a morphological analysis of the genus and found the cicadas split naturally into clades according to biogeographical region. Of the 15 Australian species, the floury baker was the earliest offshoot. Unpublished data confirmed it was quite genetically distant from the other 14 species, and so it was classified in a new monotypic genus Aleeta, while most of the others were placed in the genus Tryella. The morphological distinction between Aleeta and Tryella is based on two factors: A. curvicosta has a larger forewing size – rarely less than 3.2 cm (1.3 in) and usually over 4 cm (1.6 in), whereas Tryella is never above 3.2 cm (1.3 in); the uncal lobes of Aleeta's distinctive male genitalia are downturned at their distal ends, whereas those of Tryella are upturned. The name Aleeta is derived from the Greek aleton meaning flour or meal.

The floury baker gains its common name from the appearance of having been dusted with flour, and both the vernacular terms baker and miller were in use by 1860. The name is sometimes corrupted as "flowery baker". As of 1905 the same name "floury baker" was also in use for another species of Australian cicada (Altria perulata, now Arunta perulata), which has white "sacks" as sounding boxes. That species is now commonly referred to as the "white drummer".

Phylogenetic evidence supports Aleeta and Tryella being the closest relatives to the famous periodical cicadas (genus Magicicada) of North America despite being widely geographically separated.

== Description ==
With a body length of 2.9 cm (1.1 in), forewings between 3 and 5.1 cm (1.2 and 2.0 in) long, a wingspan of 9–10 cm (3.5–4 in) and weighing around 1.02 g (0.036 oz), the floury baker is a medium-sized cicada. Individuals markedly vary in size by region depending on local rainfall. Areas with an average annual rainfall of over 1,000 mm (39 in) – mostly coastal – have much larger individuals, with average forewing lengths about 1 cm (0.4 in) longer than those in low-rainfall areas.

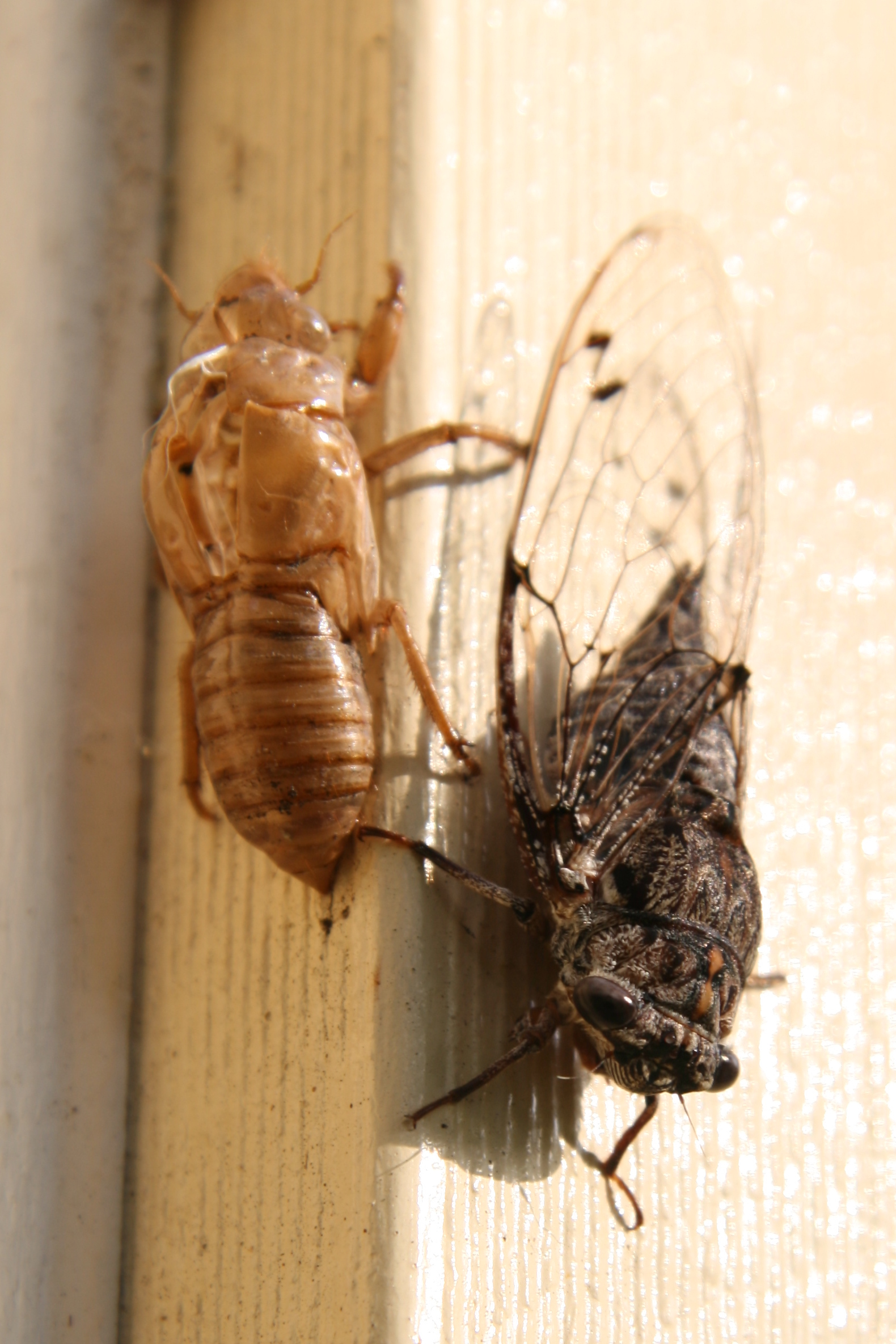
Adult facing downwards, next to shell of nymph

The adult is brown with a white dusted appearance; white downy filaments cover much of the body, legs and some wing veins, but this silver body fur is easily rubbed off, and so is often substantially diminished in older adults and museum specimens. Individuals have a variety of body markings, but all have a pale midline on their pronotum. Their legs are brown, sometimes yellowish, but with no distinct markings. Their dry mass is on average 36.2% of their total bodymass, higher than most Australian cicadas, which suggests strong exoskeletal armour. Their eyes are dark brown. They have yellowish opercula that extend laterally well beyond the body. The female is slightly larger than the male. She has generally similar colour and markings, though can be slightly paler in some areas. Her ninth abdominal segment is long and dark reddish-brown, sometimes partly tending toward black. Her ovipositor is long, with a downward tilt, and the ovipositor sheath is black or dark reddish brown.

The wings are transparent with black or brown veins and a brown-black patch at the base of apical cells 2 and 3. These patches are sometimes fused into a continuous zigzag of dark brown to black discolouration. The basal cell is often opaque and amber-coloured. As on many insects, the wing membranes are coated on either side by a repeating pattern of cuticular nanostructures, about 200 nm in height, separated by about 180 nm. These are thought to aid in anti-reflective camouflage, anti-wetting and self-cleaning.

The male call can be heard at any time of day and consists of an unusual hissing-type sound, starting as a series of one-second sibilant bursts about a second apart repeated more rapidly until they become a constant hiss lasting 7–10 s. Described as "rp, rp, rp, rp, rrrrrp", the sound is produced when single muscular contractions click the tymbal inward, buckling 7–9 of the tymbal ribs, each of which produces a pulse. This occurs alternately on the two tymbals and is rapidly repeated at a frequency of about 143 Hz (in groups of four except when the cicada is in distress – when they are ungrouped and at a lower frequency), giving a pulse repetition frequency of around 1050 per second, with a relatively broad sound frequency range of 7.5–10.5 kHz, that has a dominant frequency (at which the peak energy is observed) of 9.5–9.6 kHz.

The abdominal tracheal air sacs surround the sound muscles and extend into the abdomen, acting as resonant chambers to amplify sound. The floury baker rapidly extends or raises its abdomen, thus modulating the influence of the air sacs on the sound to change its volume, pitch or tune during the introduction to the free song. This can be heard when a cicada is undisturbed in its natural environment, while male cicadas use these calls to attract females. The species is one of Australia's loudest cicadas and has been termed "the best musician of them all".

The floury baker is distinguished from a similar undescribed species A. sp. nr. curvicosta (the little floury baker) by the structure of the male genitalia and an audibly distinct call. Members of Aleeta and Tryella are easily distinguished from other Australian cicadas as they lack tymbal covers, while the costal margin of their forewings gets larger toward the point where the wing is attached to the body. In these genera it is clearly wider than the costal vein.

== Life cycle ==
Eggs are laid in a series of slits usually cut by the mother's ovipositor in live branches or twigs of their food plants. On average about sixteen eggs, among a total batch of a few hundred, are laid in each slit. The batch all hatch around 70 days later – usually within a day or two of one another – but take longer in cold or dry conditions. Oviposition has been observed on a wide range of native and introduced plant species and can weaken the branches of young orchard trees such that they cannot sustain the load of their fruit.

After hatching, the nymphs fall from the branches to seek a crack in the soil where they can burrow, often to a depth of 10–40 cm (4–15.5 in), by digging with their large forelegs. Larger species of cicada like A. curvicosta are thought to spend 2–8 years underground, during which time they grow and feed through their rostrum on the sap from tree roots. They moult five times before emerging from the ground to shed their final shell. Although consistently taking place at night, the emergence of the population is diffusely spread over the season in comparison to the more high-density Australian species. The sex ratio is about 1.15 males to every female, consistent throughout the emergence. The metabolic rate over a period of about 6.5 hours during emergence of A. curvicosta is about 1.8 times the resting metabolic rate of the adult. A South East Queensland study reported nymphs would emerge on most tree species but avoid Norfolk pine (Araucaria heterophylla) and broad-leaved paperbark (Melaleuca quinquenervia). The adults are usually found between November and May but are sometimes observed as early as September and until as late as June. They were recorded as appearing every year, mainly in December and January in western Sydney, with a similar 92-day emergence period from late November until late February recorded in South East Queensland. This makes it one of the last Australian cicadas to emerge each season. The nymph grips onto the tree bark with all of its legs, swallows air and redistributes haemolymph to split the cast down the center of its back. It then extracts its head and clypeus by hunching its body, and when these have emerged, arches back to draw the legs out of their casing. It then slowly unfolds its wings, finally bending forward and gripping onto the front of the shell to free its abdomen. Once free it hangs for hours more as the wings harden.

Once they reach adulthood most adult cicada species live for around another two to four weeks. During this time they feed on flowing sap from tree branches, and mating and egg laying occurs.

== Distribution and habitat ==
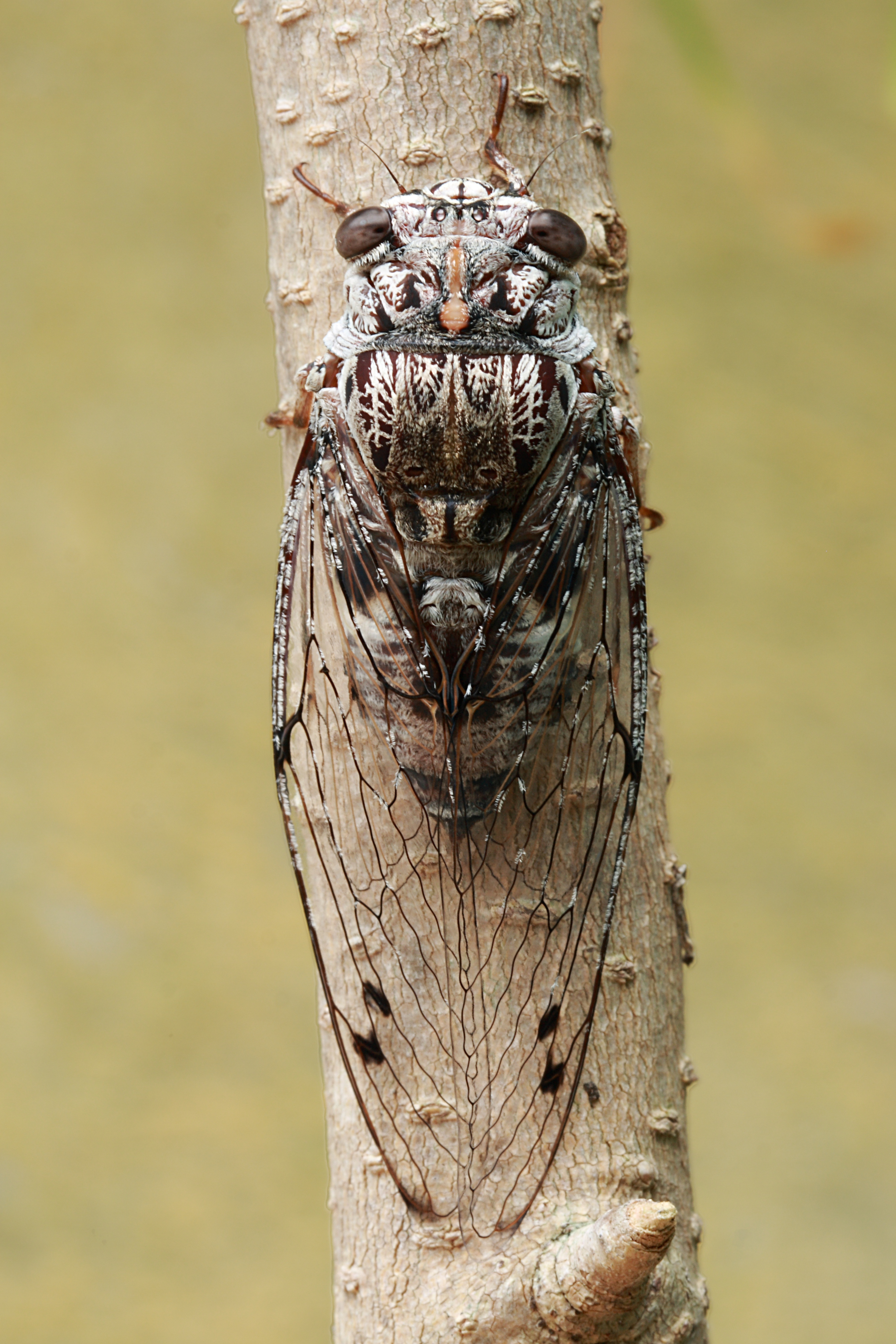
Dorsal view

The floury baker is found from the Daintree River in North Queensland to Bendalong in southern New South Wales. It is a highland species in the northern part of its range, restricted to the Atherton Tableland and Eungella National Park to the west of Mackay, but more a lowland species in the remainder of its range. It may be found in varied habitats, from rainforest margins to suburbs, even in the centre of Sydney.

== Behaviour ==
Individuals are usually solitary, with a South-East Queensland study estimating densities of only 50 per hectare (compared to some other Australian species nearly two orders of magnitude more dense). The adult floury baker normally perches facing downwards and on branches of trees rather than trunks. It is found on a wide variety of plants, most commonly on species in the family Myrtaceae, more specifically various species of Melaleuca and Callistemon plants, as well as brown hazelwood (Lysicarpus angustifolius) and pegunny (Bauhinia hookeri). These are expected to also be nymphal food plants. The species was associated with white feather honeymyrtle (Melaleuca decora) in a study at three sites in western Sydney. The broad-leaved paperbark has been confirmed as a nymphal food plant.

Floury bakers are not proficient fliers compared with other Australian cicadas. They are slow, with a typical speed of 2.1 metres per second (6.9 ft/s), which rises to around 3.9 metres per second (13 ft/s; 14 km/h) when they are pursued or provoked. They are only able to generate low aerodynamic power and their flights are relatively short, lasting around 3.4 s, with an average of 3.3 changes in direction. Nor are they adept at landing. The distance at which they react to an approaching observer is moderate, both when stationary and when in flight.

== Predation ==
Bird predation of the adult cicada is common, with wrens and grey fantails, noisy miners, blue-faced honeyeaters, little wattlebirds, grey and pied butcherbirds, magpie-larks, Torresian crows, white-faced herons and even the nocturnal tawny frogmouth, all reported as significant predators. The frogmouths and bearded dragons have been observed feeding on emerging nymphs, however total nymphal mortality is estimated at under 10%.

The adults of some Australian cicada are subject to a cicada-specific fungus from the genus Massospora, which grows on their genitalia and abdominal cavity, eventually causing the tail end to drop off. Australian cicadas are further preyed on by the cicada killer wasp (Exeirus lateritius), which stings and paralyses cicadas high in the trees. Their victims drop to the ground where the cicada-hunter mounts and carries them, pushing with its hind legs, sometimes over a distance of 100 m (330 ft). They are then shoved into the hunter's burrow, where the helpless cicada is placed on a shelf in an often extensive 'catacomb', to form food-stock for the wasp grub growing from the eggs deposited within.

== In popular culture ==
The shells shed by the nymph, as with those of other cicada species, are often collected by children and sometimes attached to their clothing. Schoolchildren have been known to bring live adults into classrooms to startle the class with their "strident shrieking", typically to the observable displeasure of teachers. Children often climb trees to collect them, and keep them temporarily as pets in shoeboxes. They cannot easily be kept for longer than a day or two, given that they need flowing sap for food. A poem dedicated to the floury baker appeared in the Catholic Press in 1930, describing its life cycle to children.

== See also ==
- List of cicadas of Australia
