= Abroma (cicada) =

Scientific classification
- Kingdom: Animalia
- Phylum: Arthropoda
- Clade: Pancrustacea
- Class: Insecta
- Order: Hemiptera
- Suborder: Auchenorrhyncha
- Family: Cicadidae
- Tribe: Lamotialnini
- Genus: Abroma; Stål, 1866

Genus of true bugs

Abroma is a genus of cicadas in the family Cicadidae. There are at least 20 described species in Abroma.

== Species ==
These 22 species belong to the genus Abroma:

- Abroma antandroyae Boulard, 2008^{c g}
- Abroma apicalis Ollenbach, 1929^{c g}
- Abroma apicifera (Walker, F., 1850)^{c g}
- Abroma bengalensis Distant, 1906^{c g}
- Abroma bowringi Distant, 1905^{c g}
- Abroma canopea Boulard, 2007^{c g}
- Abroma cincturae Boulard, 2009^{c g}
- Abroma egae (Distant, 1892)^{i c g}
- Abroma ferraria (Stal, 1870)^{c g}
- Abroma guerinii (Signoret, 1860)^{c g}
- Abroma impatiens Boulard, 2013^{c g}
- Abroma inaudibilis Boulard, 1999^{c g}
- Abroma maculicollis (Guerin-Meneville, 1838)^{c g}
- Abroma mameti Boulard, 1979^{c g}
- Abroma minor Jacobi, 1917^{c g}
- Abroma nubifurca (Walker, F., 1858)^{c g}
- Abroma orhanti Boulard, 2008^{c g}
- Abroma philippinensis Distant, 1905^{c g}
- Abroma reducta (Jacobi, 1902)^{c g}
- Abroma tahanensis Moulton, J.C., 1923^{c g}
- Abroma temperata (Walker, 1858)^{i c g}
- Abroma vinsoni Boulard, 1979^{c g}

Data sources: i = ITIS, c = Catalogue of Life, g = GBIF, b = Bugguide.net
