= Tryella castanea =

Scientific classification
- Kingdom: Animalia
- Phylum: Arthropoda
- Clade: Pancrustacea
- Class: Insecta
- Order: Hemiptera
- Suborder: Auchenorrhyncha
- Family: Cicadidae
- Genus: Tryella
- Species: T. castanea

Binomial name
- Tryella castanea (Distant, 1905)

Synonyms
- Abricta castanea Distant, 1905

Species of cicada

Tryella castanea is a species of cicada, also known as the small rusty bullet, in the true cicada family, Cicadettinae subfamily and Lamotialnini tribe. The species is endemic to Australia. It was described in 1905 by English entomologist William Lucas Distant.

== Etymology ==
The specific epithet castanea, from Latin “chestnut”, refers to the species’ colouration.

== Description ==
The length of the forewing is 17–22 mm.

== Distribution and habitat ==
The species occurs in northern Australia from the Kimberley region of Western Australia, through the Northern Territory to Burketown in north-western Queensland. The associated habitat is open woodland.

== Behaviour ==
Adult males may be heard from October to April, clinging to the stems of trees and shrubs, emitting wavering hissing calls.
