= Tryella ochra =

Scientific classification
- Kingdom: Animalia
- Phylum: Arthropoda
- Clade: Pancrustacea
- Class: Insecta
- Order: Hemiptera
- Suborder: Auchenorrhyncha
- Family: Cicadidae
- Genus: Tryella
- Species: T. ochra

Binomial name
- Tryella ochra Moulds, 2003

Species of cicada

Tryella ochra is a species of cicada, also known as the golden-brown bullet, in the true cicada family, Cicadettinae subfamily and Lamotialnini tribe. The species is endemic to Australia. It was described in 2003 by Australian entomologist Maxwell Sydney Moulds.

== Etymology ==
The specific epithet ochra comes from Greek ὤχρα (ochre), with reference to the colour of the species’ pronotum.

== Description ==
The length of the forewing is 21–26 mm. Body length is 15–20 mm.

== Distribution and habitat ==
The species occurs in tropical northern Queensland from Mount MolloyMount Molloy northwards to Coen, and westwards near the Gulf of Carpentaria to near Cape Crawford in the Northern Territory. The associated habitat is tropical, riverine, eucalypt woodland.

== Behaviour ==
The cicadas are xylem feeders. Adult males may be heard from December to February, clinging to the stems and upper branches of trees, especially eucalypts, emitting hissing calls during the day and at dusk.
