= Abricta =

Scientific classification
- Kingdom: Animalia
- Phylum: Arthropoda
- Clade: Pancrustacea
- Class: Insecta
- Order: Hemiptera
- Suborder: Auchenorrhyncha
- Family: Cicadidae
- Subfamily: Cicadettinae
- Tribe: Lamotialnini
- Genus: Abricta; Stål

Type species
- Abricta brunnea

Genus of true bugs

Abricta is a genus of cicada found in Réunion, Mauritius, northeastern India, the Moluccas, New Caledonia and eastern Australia. They make a distinctive hissing sound when calling. Adult members of the genus usually face downwards on tree branches, and lay their eggs in living tissue. The genus was originally described by Carl Stål. The type species is Abricta brunnea from Mauritius and Reunion. However, recent review of the genus has shown it to be a disparate group of species, and the Australian members moved to other genera. S.M. Moulds conducted a morphological analysis of the genus and found the cicadas split naturally into clades according to biogeographical region. Of the 15 Australian species, the floury baker was the earliest offshoot. Unpublished data confirmed it was quite genetically distant from the other 14 species and so it was classified in a new monotypic genus Aleeta, while the others were placed in the genus Tryella.

The genus has now been restricted to two species found in the region of Mauritius and surrounds.

== Species ==
- Abricta brunnea
- Abricta ferruginosa
