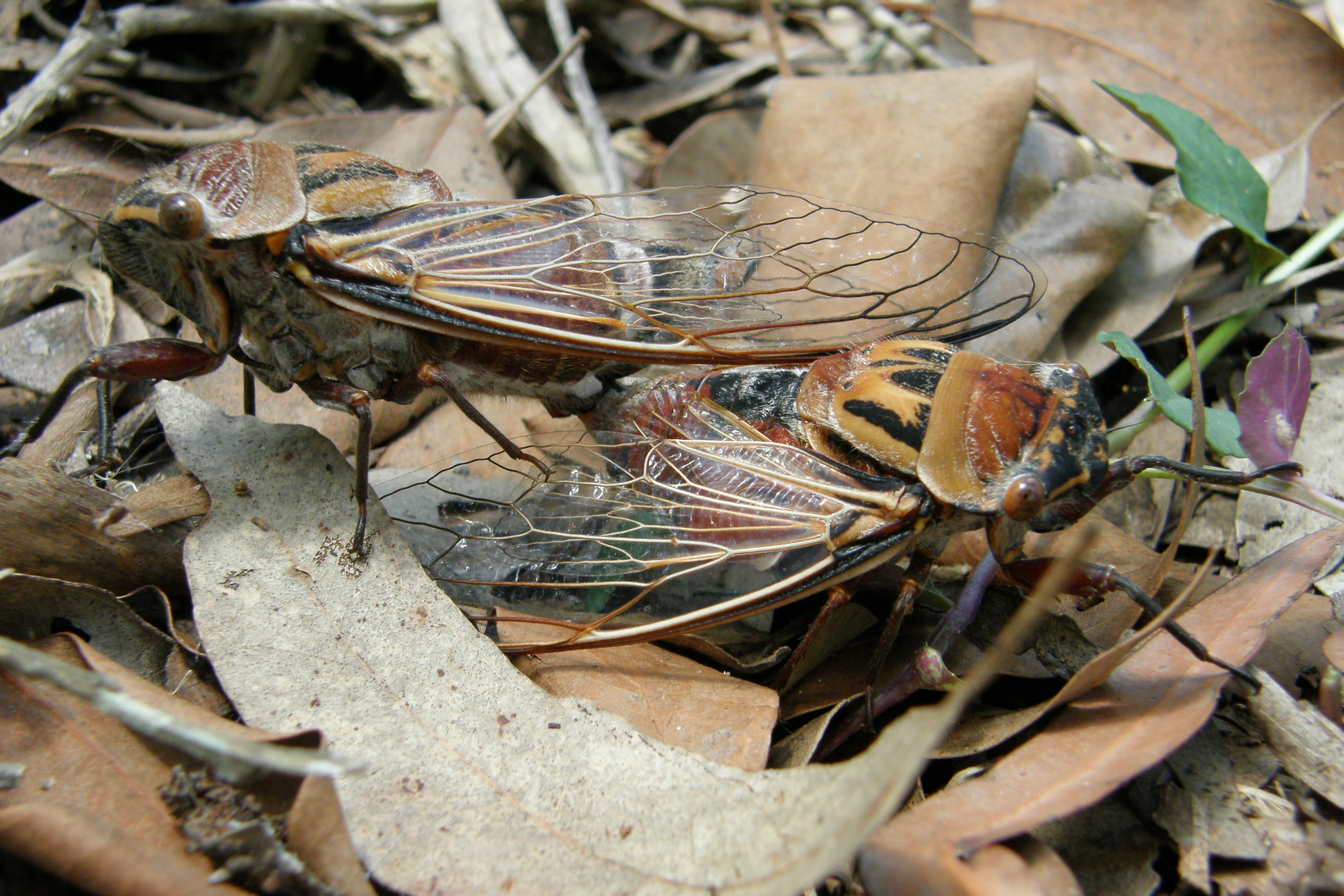
- Female Thopha saccata (behind, left) male (front, right)

Scientific classification
- Kingdom: Animalia
- Phylum: Arthropoda
- Clade: Pancrustacea
- Class: Insecta
- Order: Hemiptera
- Suborder: Auchenorrhyncha
- Family: Cicadidae
- Subfamily: Cicadinae
- Tribe: Thophini
- Genus: Thopha; Amyot and Serville, 1843

Type species
- Tettigonia saccata Fabricius, 1803

Species
- See text

= Thopha =

Genus of true bugs

Thopha (from Hebrew: תף, romanized: tof, lit. 'drum') is a genus of cicadas native to Australia. They are also known as double drummers. Genetic and morphological data show that Thopha is closely related to the genus Arunta; together they comprise the tribe Thophini.

== Species ==
There are five described species:

- Thopha colorata Distant, 1907 (Orange Drummer, Golden Drummer)
- Thopha emmotti Moulds, 2001 (Desert Double Drummer)
- Thopha hutchinsoni Moulds, 2008 (Pilbara Double Drummer)
- Thopha saccata (Fabricius, 1803) (Eastern Double Drummer)
- Thopha sessiliba Distant, 1892 (Northern Double Drummer)
  - T. s. sessiliba Distant, 1892
  - T. s. clamoris Moulds & Hill, 2015
