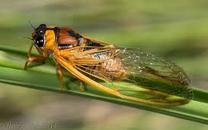
- Tryella graminea

Scientific classification
- Kingdom: Animalia
- Phylum: Arthropoda
- Clade: Pancrustacea
- Class: Insecta
- Order: Hemiptera
- Suborder: Auchenorrhyncha
- Family: Cicadidae
- Subfamily: Cicadettinae
- Tribe: Lamotialnini
- Genus: Tryella; Moulds, 2003

Type species
- Tryella ochra

Synonyms
- Tyrella Moulds, 2003

= Tryella =

Genus of true bugs

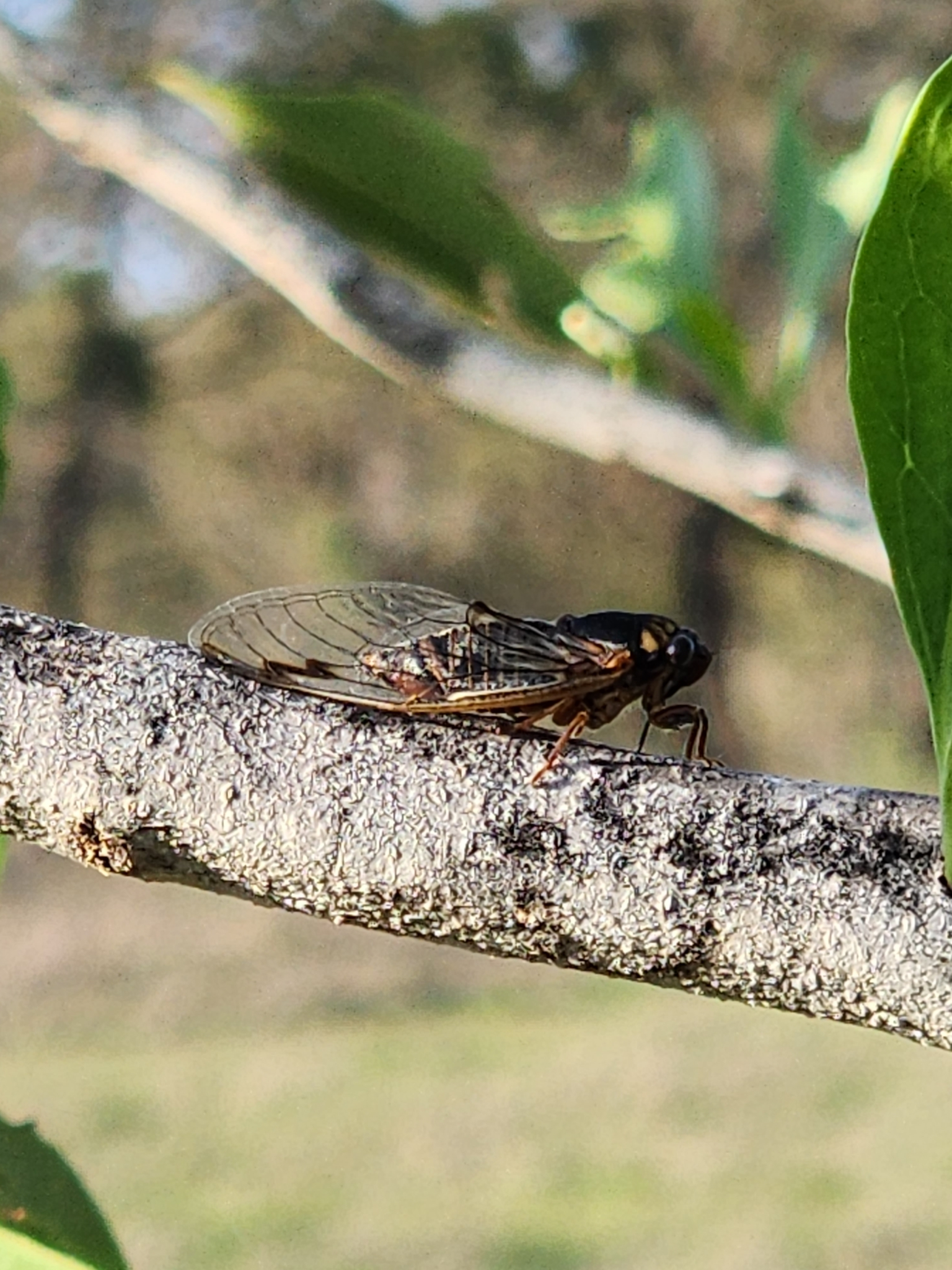
Tryella willsi, Australia

Tryella is a genus of cicadas found in Australia and New Guinea. The group are commonly called bullets, the name derived from markings behind their heads, which together with their compact bodies make them resemble bullets while in flight.

== Taxonomy ==
For many years, the members were classified in the genus Abricta. However, recent review of the genus has shown it to be a disparate group of species, and the Australian members moved to other genera. Australian entomologist Maxwell Sydney Moulds conducted a morphological analysis of the genus and found the cicadas split naturally into clades according to biogeographical region.

Of the 15 Australian species, the floury baker was the earliest offshoot. Unpublished data confirmed it was quite genetically distant from the other 14 species and so it was classified in a new monotypic genus Aleeta, while the others were placed in the genus Tryella. The genus name is derived from the Ancient Greek tryelis "ladle" and relates to the ladle-shaped uncal lobes of the species in the genus.

Phylogenetic evidence supports Tryella and Aleeta as being the closest relatives to the famous periodical cicadas (genus Magicicada) of North America despite being widely geographically separated from them.

== Species ==
The type species is Tryella ochra. Within the group, cladistic morphological analysis showed T. rubra to be the earliest offshoot within the genus. The relationships between other species was not able to be clarified.

As of 2025 there were 16 described species in the genus.

- Tryella adela Moulds, 2003 (NT) - small maroon bullet
- Tryella burnsi Moulds, 2003 (QLD) - brown bullet
- Tryella castanea (Distant, 1905) (NT, QLD, WA) - small rusty bullet
- Tryella crassa Moulds, 2003 (NT, QLD) - dusky bullet
- Tryella fumipennis Emery, Emery, Hutchinson & Ong, 2022 (WA) - smoky-winged bullet
- Tryella graminea Moulds, 2003 (NT, QLD) - grass bullet
- Tryella infuscata Moulds, 2003 (NT, QLD) - large maroon bullet
- Tryella kauma Moulds, 2003 (QLD) - whispering bullet
- Tryella lachlani Moulds, 2003 (QLD, PNG) - golden black bullet
- Tryella noctua (Distant, 1913) (WA) - chocolate bullet
- Tryella occidens Moulds, 2003 (WA) - dusty brown bullet
- Tryella ochra Moulds, 2003 (NT, QLD) - golden-brown bullet
- Tryella rubra (Goding & Froggatt, 1904) (WA, NT, QLD) - large rusty bullet
- Tryella stalkeri (Distant, 1907) (WA) - honey bullet
- Tryella willsi (Distant, 1882) (QLD) - black bullet
- Tryella wuggubun Emery, Emery, Hutchinson & Ong, 2022 (NT, WA) - Kimberley bullet

== Distribution and habitat ==
The species are found across eastern, central and northern Australia, and south-western New Guinea, predominantly on trees, especially eucalypts.

== Behaviour ==
Male Tryella cicadas call during the day and dusk. Adults emerge from pupation after monsoonal rain. They characteristically sit facing downwards on branches, of generally less than 5 cm (2.0 in) in diameter. One species, T. graminea, is found on grass.
