= Arunta interclusa =

Scientific classification
- Kingdom: Animalia
- Phylum: Arthropoda
- Clade: Pancrustacea
- Class: Insecta
- Order: Hemiptera
- Suborder: Auchenorrhyncha
- Family: Cicadidae
- Genus: Arunta
- Species: A. interclusa

Binomial name
- Arunta interclusa (Walker, 1858)

Species of cicada

Arunta interclusa, also known as the mangrove drummer or mangrove cicada, is a species of cicada in the true cicada family. It is endemic to Australia. It was described in 1858 by English entomologist Francis Walker.

== Description ==
The length of the forewing is 35–43 mm.

== Distribution and habitat ==
The species occurs in coastal eastern Australia, from Cooktown in Far North Queensland southwards to Newcastle, New South Wales. The associated habitat is mangroves, though females may also be found in coastal dune vegetation above the tidal zone.

== Behaviour ==
Adults have been heard from November to May, clinging to the upper branches of mangrove trees, uttering far-carrying, rattling calls.
