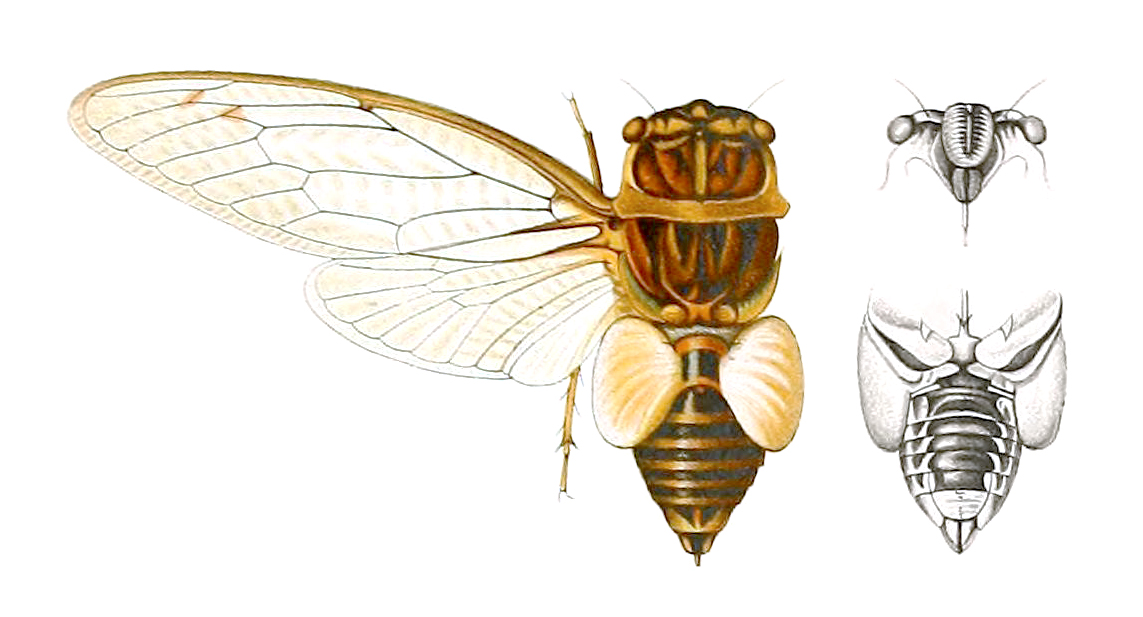
- Arunta perulata, male

Scientific classification
- Kingdom: Animalia
- Phylum: Arthropoda
- Clade: Pancrustacea
- Class: Insecta
- Order: Hemiptera
- Suborder: Auchenorrhyncha
- Family: Cicadidae
- Subfamily: Cicadinae
- Tribe: Thophini
- Genus: Arunta; Distant, 1904

Species
- See text

= Arunta =

Genus of true bugs

Arunta is a genus of cicadas, also called drummers, in the Thophini tribe of the Cicadinae subfamily. It is allied to the genus Thopha. These are the only Australian cicadas that have adapted to living in mangrove habitats.

== Species ==
Two species have been described:

- Arunta interclusa (Walker, 1858) (Mangrove Drummer)
- Arunta perulata (Guérin-Méneville, 1831) (White Drummer)
