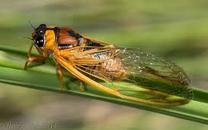

Scientific classification
- Kingdom: Animalia
- Phylum: Arthropoda
- Clade: Pancrustacea
- Class: Insecta
- Order: Hemiptera
- Suborder: Auchenorrhyncha
- Family: Cicadidae
- Genus: Tryella
- Species: T. graminea

Binomial name
- Tryella graminea Moulds, 2003

= Tryella graminea =

Species of true bug

Tryella graminea, known as the grass buzzing bullet, is a species of insect in the genus Tryella. It has rounded thorax and short, hard wings. Forewing length is 20 to 27 mm. Tryella graminea inhabits in Australia.
