= Thopha emmotti =

Scientific classification
- Kingdom: Animalia
- Phylum: Arthropoda
- Clade: Pancrustacea
- Class: Insecta
- Order: Hemiptera
- Suborder: Auchenorrhyncha
- Family: Cicadidae
- Genus: Thopha
- Species: T. emmotti

Binomial name
- Thopha emmotti Moulds, 2001

Species of cicada

Thopha emmotti, also known as the desert double drummer, is a species of cicada in the true cicada family. It is endemic to Australia. It was described in 2001 by Australian entomologist Maxwell Sydney Moulds.

== Description ==
The length of the forewing is 47–64 mm.

== Distribution and habitat ==
The species occurs in Central West Queensland, from Blackall westwards to the Boulia district. The holotype was collected at a Westerton Station rockhole. The associated habitat is low, open eucalypt and mulga woodland. Favoured trees include Eucalyptus thozetiana, E. papuana, and E. terminalis, often growing on rocky outcrops or beside watercourses.

== Behaviour ==
Adults have been heard from December to February, clinging to the main trunks and upper branches of eucalypts, uttering loud, electric, whining calls.
