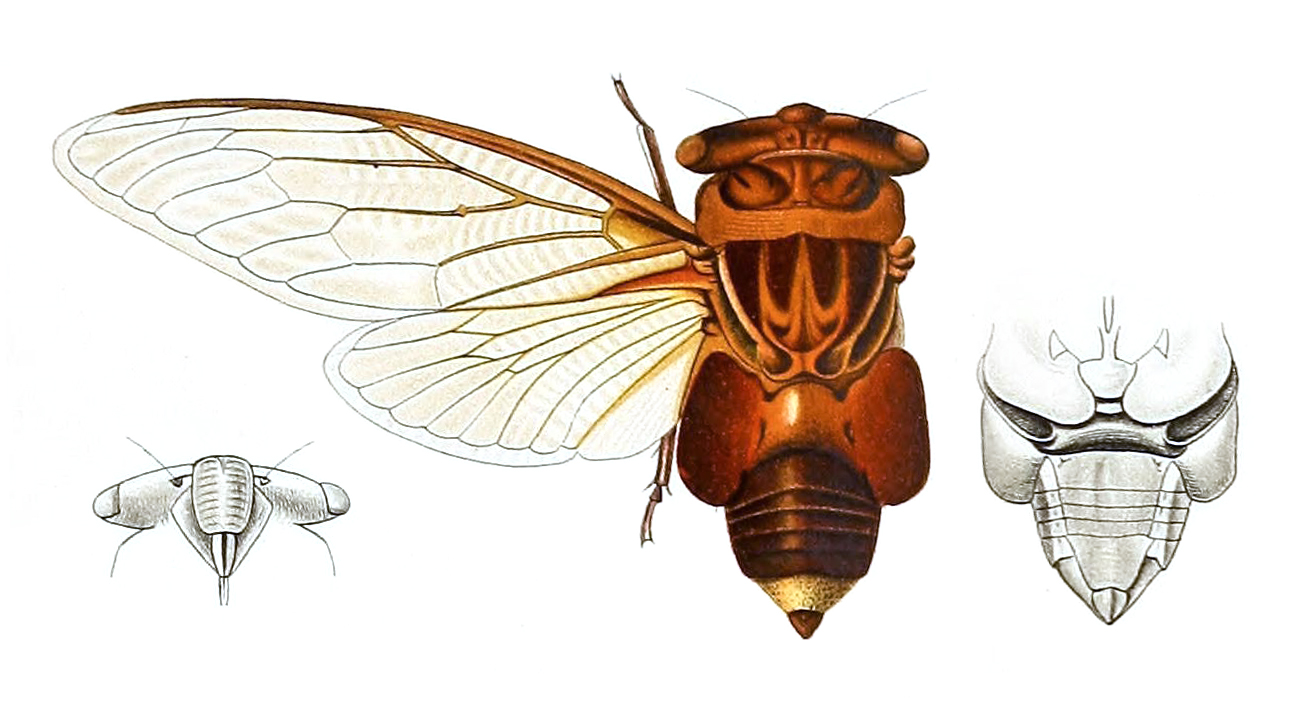
- Adult male

Scientific classification
- Kingdom: Animalia
- Phylum: Arthropoda
- Class: Insecta
- Order: Hemiptera
- Suborder: Auchenorrhyncha
- Family: Cicadidae
- Genus: Thopha
- Species: T. sessiliba

Binomial name
- Thopha sessiliba Distant, 1892

Synonyms
- Thopha stentor Buckton; Thopha nigricans Distant

= Thopha sessiliba =

Species of true bug

Thopha sessiliba, commonly known as the northern double drummer, is an Australian cicada native to Queensland, the Northern Territory and northern Western Australia. Adults perch almost exclusively on ghost gums.

William Lucas Distant described the northern double drummer in 1892, but incorrectly gave the type locality as Sydney.

== Description ==
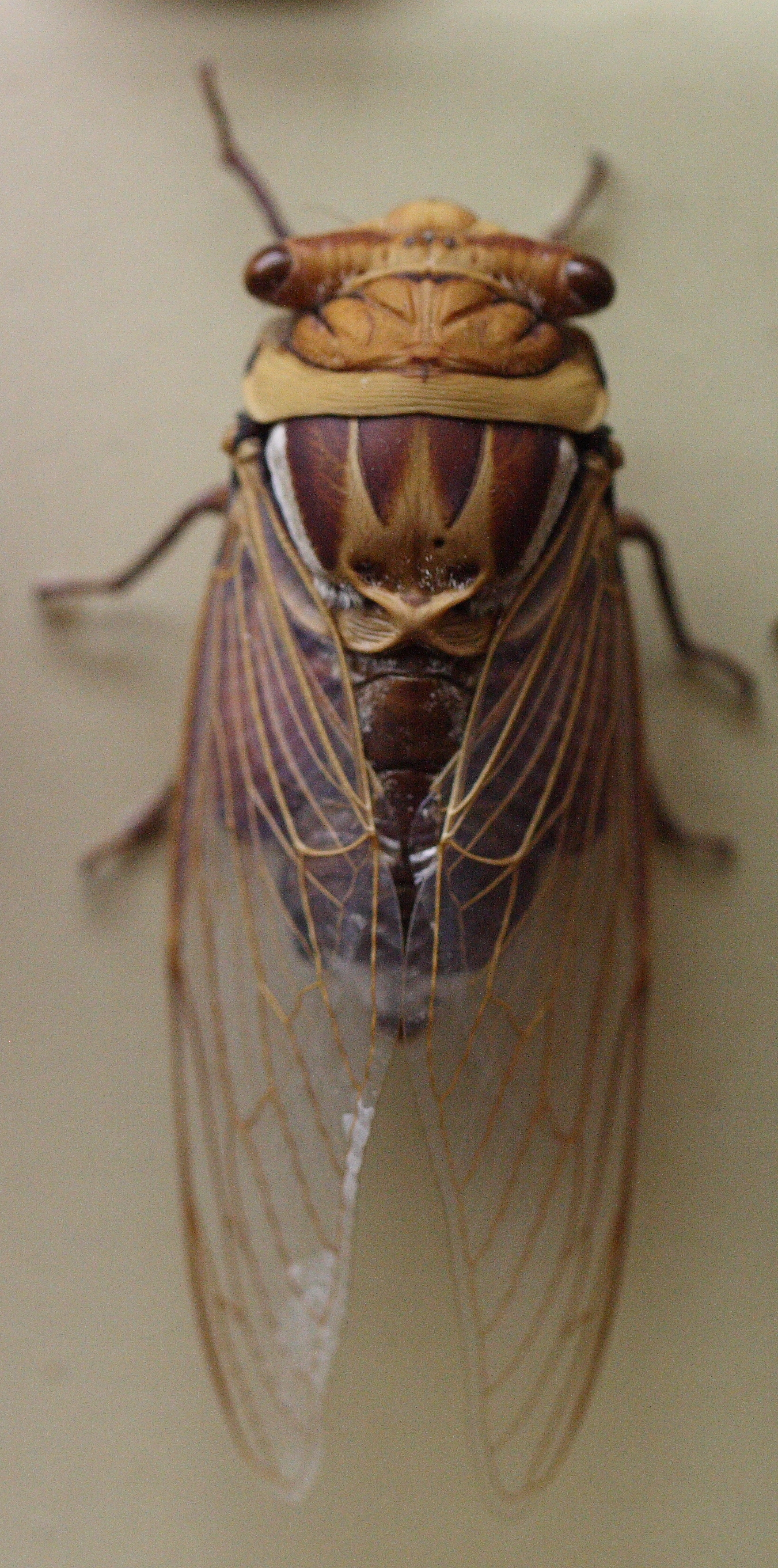
Specimen in the Australian Museum

The northern double drummer is a large species of cicada, the second largest in Australia, just smaller than the largest species, the double drummer. The male and female average 4.56 cm long. The thorax is 1.85 cm in diameter. The eyes are light brown tinged with purple, and the postclypeus dark red-brown. The head is variable in colour, but never black like the double drummer. The thorax is brown with lighter golden-brown markings. The mesonotum is brown tinged with purple. The underside of the thorax is red-brown and covered in fine silvery velvety hairs. The abdomen is dark brown, with the first and second segments above and underside covered with grey hairs, and also a whitish pregenital band of hair. The wings are vitreous (transparent) with light brown veins. The legs are brown and have fine grey velvety hairs.

Adult cicadas emerge from September and can be seen until the end of April, though are most abundant in December and January.

== Distribution ==
The northern double drummer is found from Gladstone in southeast Queensland north to Cape York and Mount Isa, and across eastern and northern Northern Territory and into northern Western Australia, across the Kimberley and Broome to Mundiwindi. It is found on eucalyptus trees, particularly smooth-barked species such as the ghost gum (Corymbia aparrerinja) in Central Australia.

== See also ==
- List of cicadas of Australia
