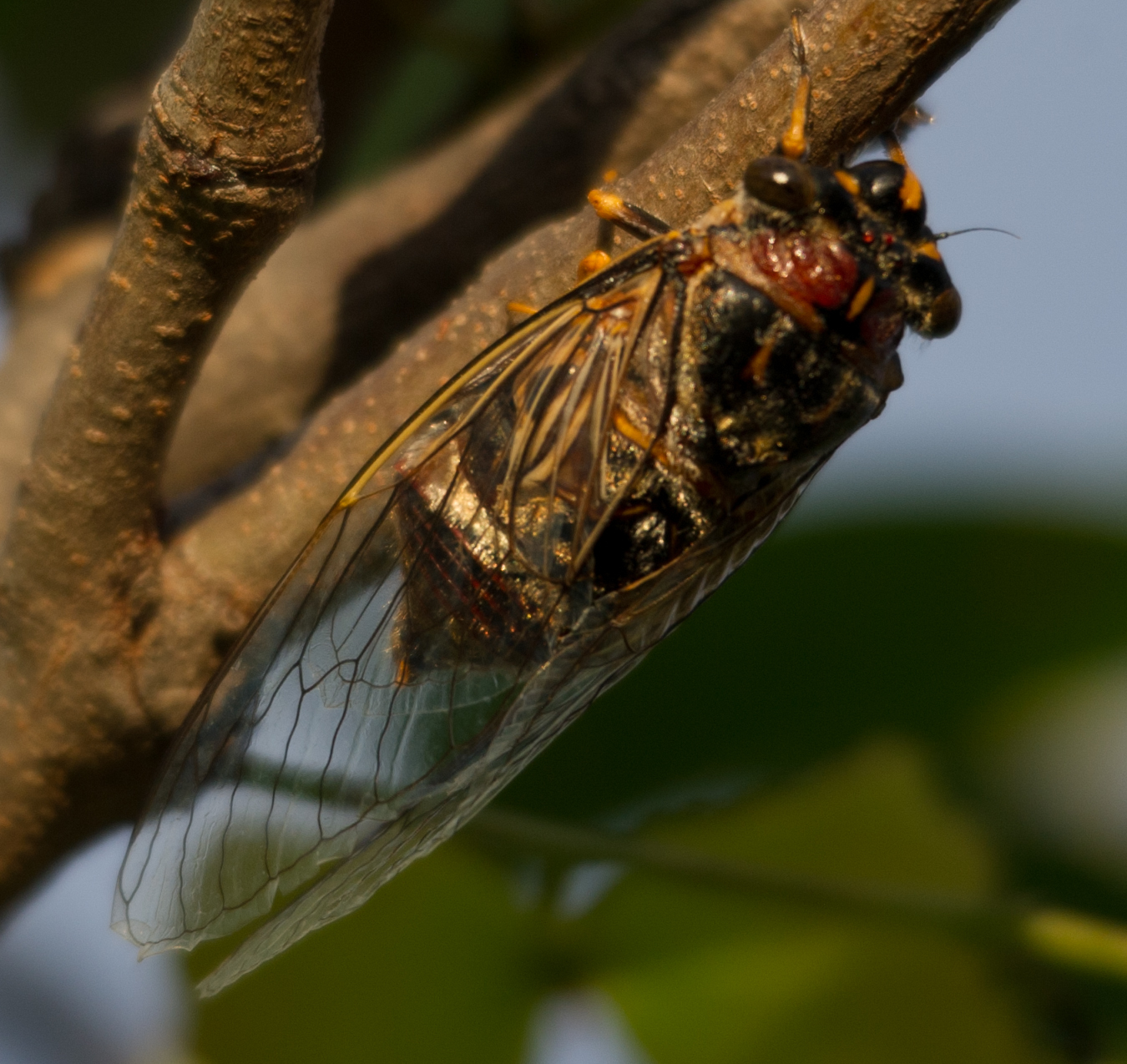
- Monomatapa insignis

Scientific classification
- Kingdom: Animalia
- Phylum: Arthropoda
- Clade: Pancrustacea
- Class: Insecta
- Order: Hemiptera
- Suborder: Auchenorrhyncha
- Family: Cicadidae
- Genus: Monomatapa; Distant, 1897

= Monomatapa (cicada) =

Genus of true bugs

Monomatapa is a genus of cicadas in the family Cicadidae. There are at least three described species in the genus Monomatapa.

== Species ==
These three species belong to the genus Monomatapa:

- Monomatapa insignis Distant, 1897^{c g}
- Monomatapa matoposa Boulard, 1980^{c g}
- Monomatapa socotrana Distant, 1905^{c g}

Data sources: i = ITIS, c = Catalogue of Life, g = GBIF, b = Bugguide.net
