= Osmond Charles Ollenbach =

Osmond Charles Ollenbach (1869-6 July 1935) was a surveyor with the Survey of India who was also a keen amateur entomologist and naturalist. He travelled across India and Burma as a surveyor with the Great Trigonometrical Survey and made collections of insects with nearly 17000 insect specimens some of which are now in the Natural History Museum, London, and at the Forest Research Institute, Dehra Dun, where he worked after retirement as an entomologist.

Ollenbach was born in India and had taken an interest in butterflies from his childhood days in Mussoorie. He retired from the Survey of India in 1922 as a Class I officer.

- Ollenbach, O. C. "Notes on wild dogs in India and Burma." Jour. Darjeel. Nat. Hist. Soc 4 (1930): 83-86.
- Ollenbach, O. C. "Butterfly collection grounds at Mussoorie (UP)." Journal of the Bombay Natural History Society 34.3 (1930): 836-840.
- Ollenbach, O. C. "New species of Cicadidae and Fulgoridae from India and Burma.(Hemip.)." Indian Forest Records 13 (1929): 271-282.

Bruchophagus ollenbachi Mani and Kaul, 1974 is named from a specimen from his collections.
