= Panka (cicada) =

Scientific classification
- Kingdom: Animalia
- Phylum: Arthropoda
- Clade: Pancrustacea
- Class: Insecta
- Order: Hemiptera
- Suborder: Auchenorrhyncha
- Family: Cicadidae
- Genus: Panka

Genus of true bugs

Panka is a genus of cicadas in the family Cicadidae. About nine described species are in Panka.

== Species ==
These nine species belong to the genus Panka:

- Panka africana Distant, 1905^{c g}
- Panka duartei Boulard, 1975^{c g}
- Panka lunguncus Boulard, 1970^{c g}
- Panka minimuncus Boulard, 1970^{c g}
- Panka parvula Boulard, 1973^{c g}
- Panka parvulina Boulard, 1995^{c g}
- Panka silvestris Jacobi, 1912^{c g}
- Panka simulata Distant, 1905^{c g}
- Panka umbrosa Distant, 1920^{c g}

Data sources: i = ITIS, c = Catalogue of Life, g = GBIF, b = Bugguide.net
