= Thophini =

Scientific classification
- Kingdom: Animalia
- Phylum: Arthropoda
- Clade: Pancrustacea
- Class: Insecta
- Order: Hemiptera
- Suborder: Auchenorrhyncha
- Superfamily: Cicadoidea
- Family: Cicadidae
- Subfamily: Cicadinae
- Tribe: Thophini; Distant, 1904

Tribe of true bugs

Thophini is a tribe of cicadas in the family Cicadidae, found in Australia. There are at least two genera and about nine described species in Thophini.

== Genera ==
These two genera belong to the tribe Thophini:

- Arunta Distant, 1904
- Thopha Amyot & Audinet-Serville, 1843
