= Tymbal =

Structure used in sound production by insects

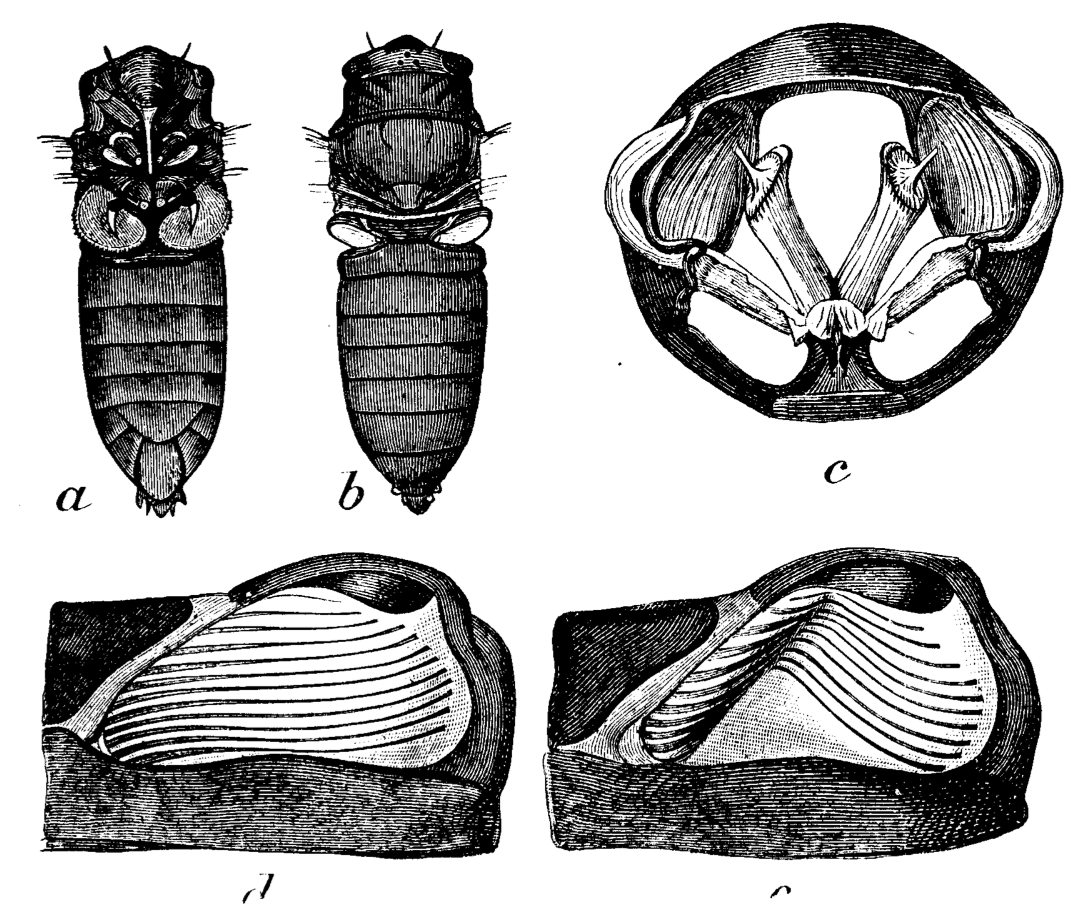
Cicada tymbals: sound-producing organs and musculature.: 1. Body of male Cicada from below, showing cover-plates of sound-producing organs; 2. From above showing tymbals (drums), natural size; 3. Section showing muscles which vibrate tymbals (magnified); 4. A tymbal at rest; 5. A tymbal thrown into vibration (as when cicada is singing), more highly magnified

The tymbal (or timbal) is the corrugated exoskeletal structure used to produce sounds in insects. In male cicadas, the tymbals are membranes in the abdomen, responsible for the characteristic sound produced by the insect. In tiger moths, the tymbals are modified regions of the thorax and produce high-frequency clicks. In lesser wax moths the left and right tymbals emit high-frequency pulses that are used as mating calls.

The paired tymbals of a cicada are located on the sides of the abdominal base. The "singing" of a cicada is not stridulation as in many other familiar sound-producing insects like crickets (where one structure is rubbed against another): the tymbals are regions of the exoskeleton that are modified to form a complex membrane with thin, membranous portions and thickened "ribs". These membranes vibrate rapidly, and enlarged chambers derived from the tracheae enable the cicada's body to be a resonance chamber, greatly amplifying the sound. Some cicadas produce sounds louder than 106 dB (SPL), among the loudest of all insect-produced sounds. They modulate their noise by positioning their abdomens toward or away from the substrate.

The sound of an Amphipsalta zelandica cicada in Lower Hutt, New Zealand, recorded in mid-February, 2006

Magicicada cassini singing

The tymbals of a tiger moth are specialized regions on the metathoracic episterna, normally corrugated such that sound is produced when the entire tymbal surface is buckled by muscular contraction and then released, producing a series of extremely rapid "clicks" as the corrugations flex back into place. These sounds are only occasionally audible to humans, and are used in both acoustic aposematism (the moths are advertising to bats that they are toxic), and as mating signals. A recent study demonstrates that these sounds are used by some moths to "jam" the sonar of moth-eating bats.
