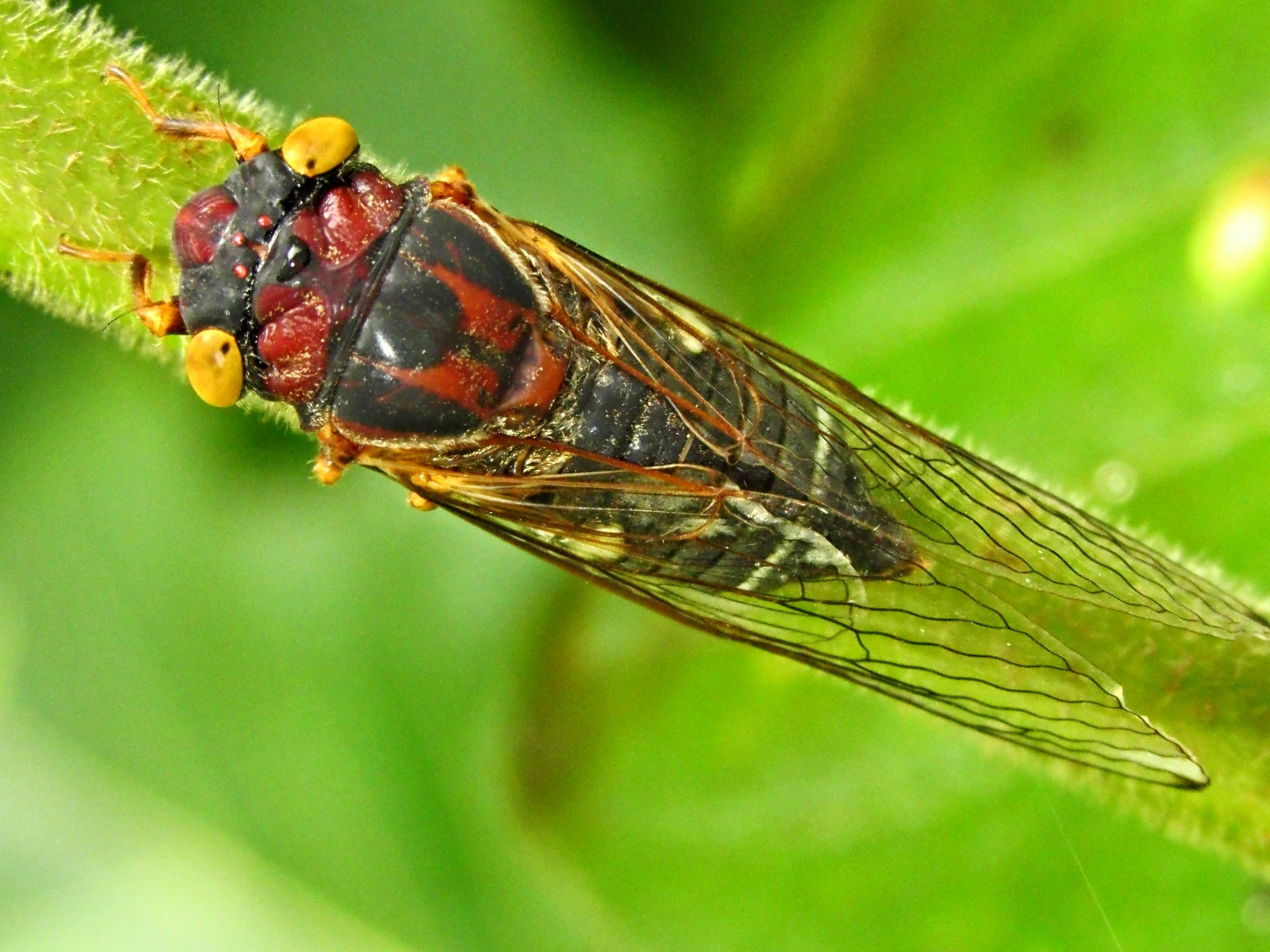
- Lemuriana apicalis

Scientific classification
- Kingdom: Animalia
- Phylum: Arthropoda
- Clade: Pancrustacea
- Class: Insecta
- Order: Hemiptera
- Suborder: Auchenorrhyncha
- Family: Cicadidae
- Subfamily: Cicadettinae
- Tribe: Lamotialnini; Boulard, 1976

= Lamotialnini =

Tribe of true bugs

Lamotialnini is a tribe of cicadas in the family Cicadidae. There are about 19 genera and at least 90 described species in Lamotialnini, occurring worldwide except South America.

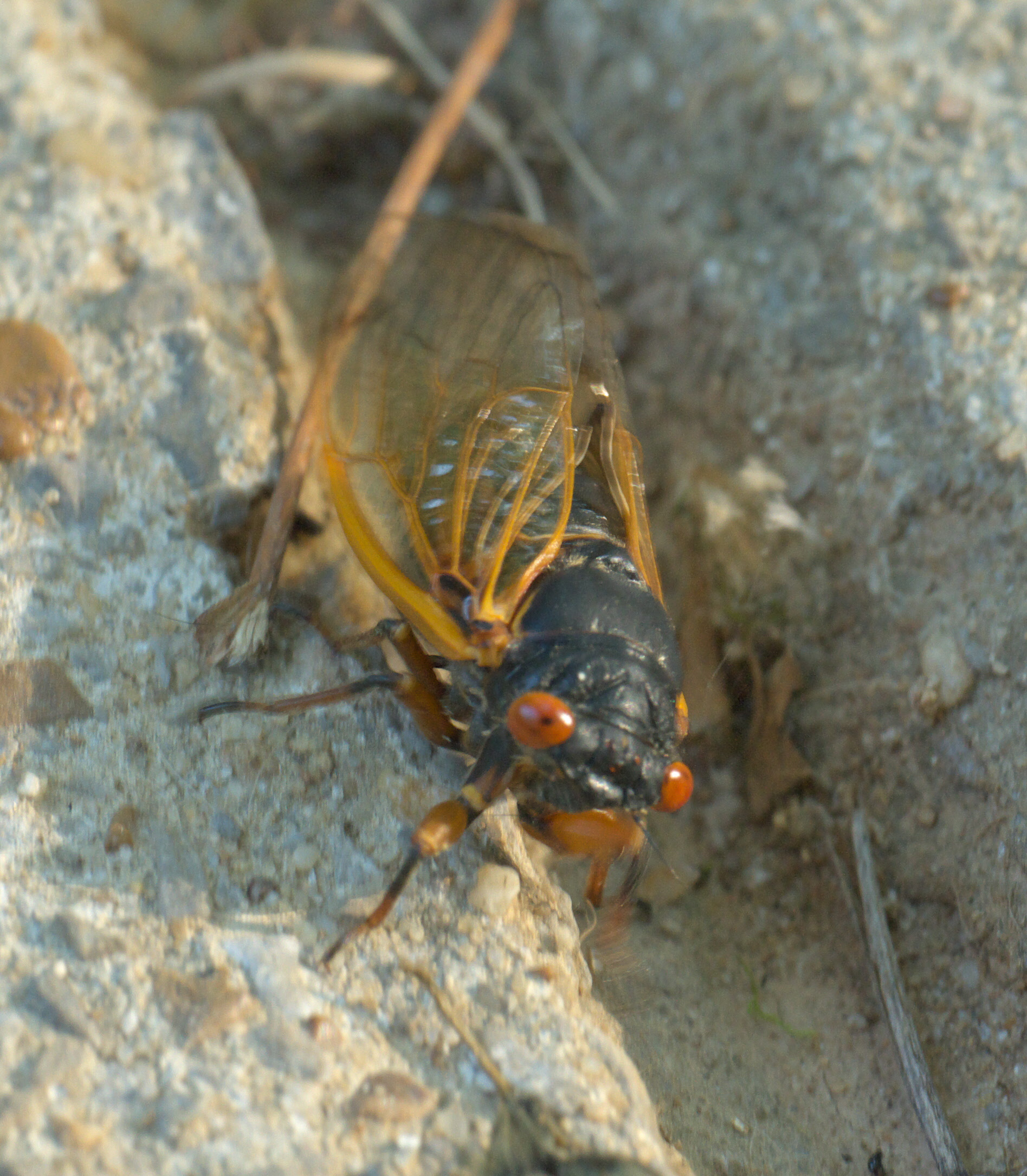
Magicicada tredecassini

== Genera ==
These 19 genera belong to the tribe Lamotialnini:

- Abricta Stål, 1866^{c g}
- Abroma Stål, 1866^{i c g}
- Aleeta Moulds, 2003^{c g}
- Allobroma Duffels, 2011^{c g}
- Chrysolasia Moulds, 2003^{i c g}
- Hylora Boulard, 1971^{c g}
- Lamotialna Boulard, 1976^{c g}
- Lemuriana Distant, 1905^{g}
- Magicicada Davis, 1925^{i c g b} (periodical cicadas)
- Monomatapa Distant, 1879^{c g}
- Musimoia China, 1929^{c g}
- Neomuda Distant, 1920^{c g}
- Oudeboschia Distant, 1920^{c g}
- Panka Distant, 1905^{c g}
- Sundabroma Duffels, 2011^{c g}
- Trismarcha Karsch, 1891^{c g}
- Tryella Moulds, 2003^{c g}
- Unduncus Duffels, 2011^{c g}
- Viettealna Boulard, 1980^{c g} - Madagascar

Data sources: i = ITIS, c = Catalogue of Life, g = GBIF, b = Bugguide.net
