= Chlorocysta suffusa =

Scientific classification
- Kingdom: Animalia
- Phylum: Arthropoda
- Clade: Pancrustacea
- Class: Insecta
- Order: Hemiptera
- Suborder: Auchenorrhyncha
- Family: Cicadidae
- Genus: Chlorocysta
- Species: C. suffusa

Binomial name
- Chlorocysta suffusa (Distant, 1907)

Synonyms
- Mardalana suffusa Distant, 1907

Species of cicada

Chlorocysta suffusa is a species, or species complex, of cicadas, also known as marbled bottle cicadas, in the true cicada family, Cicadettinae subfamily and Chlorocystini tribe. The species is endemic to Australia. It was described in 1907 by English entomologist William Lucas Distant.

== Etymology ==
The specific epithet suffusa (Latin: “blushing”) refers to the cicadas’ appearance.

== Description ==
The length of the forewing is 25–32 mm.

== Distribution and habitat ==
The species complex occurs in Wet Tropics of Queensland from Cooktown southwards to the Paluma Range, with isolated populations at Coen and Iron Range. Associated habitats include tropical rainforest, riparian forest and well-vegetated gardens.

== Behaviour ==
The cicadas are xylem feeders. Adult males may be heard from November to April, clinging to the main trunks of rainforest trees, emitting drawn-out, whistling calls.
