= Gymnotympana rufa =

Scientific classification
- Kingdom: Animalia
- Phylum: Arthropoda
- Clade: Pancrustacea
- Class: Insecta
- Order: Hemiptera
- Suborder: Auchenorrhyncha
- Family: Cicadidae
- Genus: Gymnotympana
- Species: G. rufa

Binomial name
- Gymnotympana rufa (Ashton, 1914)

Synonyms
- Baeturia rufa Ashton, 1914

Species of cicada

Gymnotympana rufa is a species of cicada, also known as the crimson fairy, in the true cicada family, Cicadettinae subfamily and Chlorocystini tribe. The species is endemic to Australia. It was described in 1914 by Australian entomologist Julian Howard Ashton.

== Etymology ==
The specific epithet rufa (Latin: “reddish”) refers to the cicadas’ colouration.

== Description ==
The length of the forewing is 17–22 mm.

== Distribution and habitat ==
The species occurs on the Cape York Peninsula of Far North Queensland, where it is known from the Iron Range, McIlwraith Range and Wenlock River. The associated habitat is tropical rainforest.

== Behaviour ==
The cicadas are xylem feeders. Adults appear from December to June, clinging to the upper foliage of rainforest vegetation.
