= Chlorocysta fumea =

Scientific classification
- Kingdom: Animalia
- Phylum: Arthropoda
- Clade: Pancrustacea
- Class: Insecta
- Order: Hemiptera
- Suborder: Auchenorrhyncha
- Family: Cicadidae
- Genus: Chlorocysta
- Species: C. fumea

Binomial name
- Chlorocysta fumea (Ashton, 1914)

Synonyms
- Mardalana fumea Ashton, 1914

Species of cicada

Chlorocysta fumea is a species of cicada, also known as the McIlwraith Range bottle cicada, in the true cicada family, Cicadettinae subfamily and Chlorocystini tribe. The species is endemic to Australia. It was described in 1914 by Australian entomologist Julian Howard Ashton.

== Distribution and habitat ==
The species is only known from the southern end of the McIlwraith Range on the tropical Cape York Peninsula of Far North Queensland. The associated habitat is vine scrub.
