= Chlorocysta vitripennis =

Scientific classification
- Kingdom: Animalia
- Phylum: Arthropoda
- Clade: Pancrustacea
- Class: Insecta
- Order: Hemiptera
- Suborder: Auchenorrhyncha
- Family: Cicadidae
- Genus: Chlorocysta
- Species: C. vitripennis

Binomial name
- Chlorocysta vitripennis (Westwood, 1851)

Synonyms
- Cystosoma (Chlorocysta) vitripennis Westwood, 1851; Cicada congrua Walker, 1862; Chlorocysta macrula Stål, 1863; Kanakia congrua Goding & Froggatt, 1904

Species of cicada

Chlorocysta vitripennis is a species of cicada, also known as the lesser bottle cicada, in the true cicada family, Cicadettinae subfamily and Chlorocystini tribe. The species is endemic to Australia. It was described in 1851 by English entomologist John Obadiah Westwood.

== Etymology ==
The specific epithet vitripennis (Latin: “glassy wing”) refers to the species’ appearance.

== Description ==
The length of the forewing is 19–26 mm.

== Distribution and habitat ==
The species occurs in high-rainfall, coastal and subcoastal areas of eastern Australia, from Bundaberg in Queensland southwards to Taree in New South Wales, with a small population in Sydney that may have been accidentally introduced. Associated habitats include coastal and mountain rainforest, the leafy understorey of wet sclerophyll forests, pockets of remnant vegetation and regrowth, weeds such as privet and lantana, and leafy gardens.

== Behaviour ==
Adult males may be heard from late August to May, while clinging to the foliage and outer branches of leafy vegetation, emitting calls described as drawn-out, buzzing whistles.
