= Gymnotympana =

Scientific classification
- Kingdom: Animalia
- Phylum: Arthropoda
- Clade: Pancrustacea
- Class: Insecta
- Order: Hemiptera
- Suborder: Auchenorrhyncha
- Family: Cicadidae
- Subfamily: Cicadettinae
- Tribe: Chlorocystini
- Genus: Gymnotympana; Stål, 1861

Genus of cicadas

Gymnotympana is a genus of cicadas in the family Cicadidae, subfamily Cicadettinae and tribe Chlorocystini. It is native to Australia and New Guinea. It was described in 1861 by Swedish entomologist Carl Stål.

== Etymology ==
The generic name Gymnotympana is an anatomical reference derived from Greek γυμνός ("naked" or "uncovered") and τύμπανον ("drum" or "tympanum").

== Species ==
As of 2025 there were 22 valid species in the genus:

- Gymnotympana boeri Sanborn, 2015
- Gymnotympana dahli (Kuhlgatz, 1905)
- Gymnotympana hirsuta Boer, 1995
- Gymnotympana langeraki Boer, 1995
- Gymnotympana leucogramma Sanborn, 2015
- Gymnotympana membrana Boer, 1995
- Gymnotympana minoramembrana Boer, 1995
- Gymnotympana montana Boer, 1995
- Gymnotympana nigravirgula Boer, 1995
- Gymnotympana obiensis Boer, 1995
- Gymnotympana olivacea Distant, 1905
- Gymnotympana parvula Boer, 1995
- Gymnotympana phyloglycera Boer, 1995
- Gymnotympana rubricata (Distant, 1897)
- Gymnotympana rufa (Ashton, 1914) (Crimson Fairy)
- Gymnotympana stenocephalis Boer, 1995
- Gymnotympana strepitans (Stål, 1861)
- Gymnotympana stridens (Stål, 1861)
- Gymnotympana subnotata (Walker, 1868)
- Gymnotympana varicolor (Distant, 1907) (Red Belly)
- Gymnotympana verlaani Boer, 1995
- Gymnotympana viridis Boer, 1995
