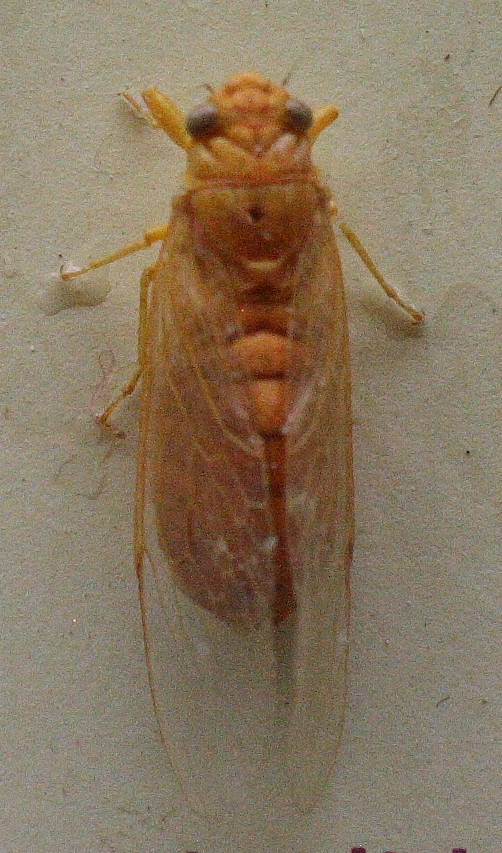

Scientific classification
- Kingdom: Animalia
- Phylum: Arthropoda
- Clade: Pancrustacea
- Class: Insecta
- Order: Hemiptera
- Suborder: Auchenorrhyncha
- Superfamily: Cicadoidea
- Family: Cicadidae
- Subfamily: Cicadettinae
- Tribe: Chlorocystini
- Genus: Chlorocysta; Westwood, 1851

= Chlorocysta =

Genus of cicadas

Chlorocysta is a genus of cicadas, also known as bottle cicadas, in the family Cicadidae, subfamily Cicadettinae and tribe Chlorocystini. It is endemic to Australia. It was described in 1851 by English entomologist John Obadiah Westwood.

== Species ==
As of 2025 there were three valid species in the genus:

- Chlorocysta fumea (Ashton, 1914) (McIllwraith Range Bottle Cicada)
- Chlorocysta suffusa (Distant, 1907) (Marbled Bottle Cicada)
- Chlorocysta vitripennis (Westwood, 1851) (Lesser Bottle Cicada)
