= Baeturia =

Baeturia or Bæturia may refer to:

- Baeturia (cicada), a genus of Australian cicadas
- Baeturia, Spain, also spelled Beturia, an Iron Age region in southern Spain

== See also ==
- Beeturia, where beet pigments render urine red
