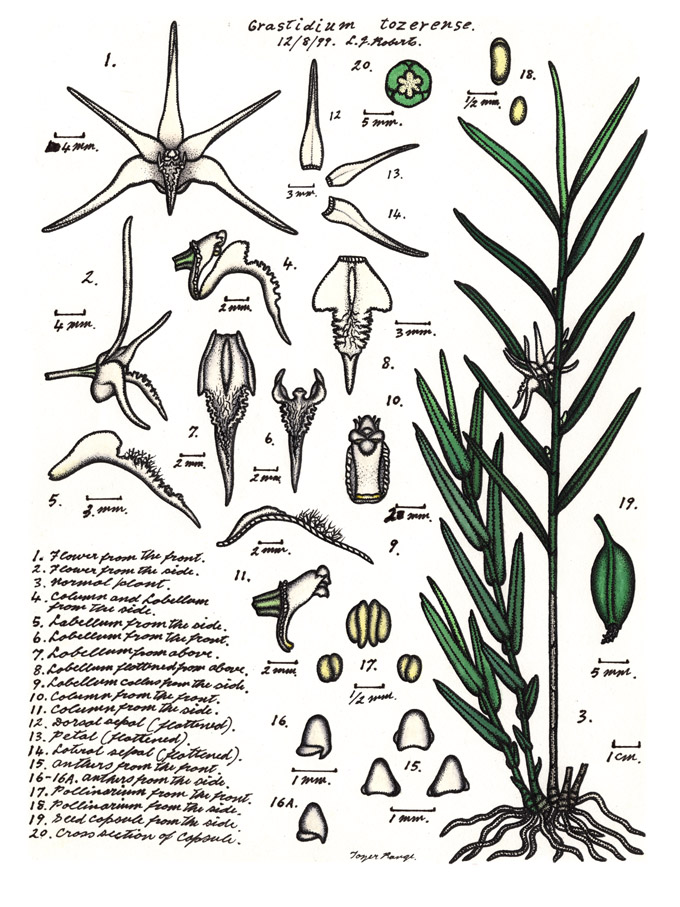
- Illustration by Lewis Roberts

Scientific classification
- Kingdom: Plantae
- Clade: Tracheophytes
- Clade: Angiosperms
- Clade: Monocots
- Order: Asparagales
- Family: Orchidaceae
- Subfamily: Epidendroideae
- Genus: Dendrobium
- Species: D. tozerense

Binomial name
- Dendrobium tozerense Lavarack

Synonyms
- Grastidium tozerense (Lavarack) M.A.Clem. & D.L.Jones

= Dendrobium tozerense =

White gemini orchid

Species of orchid

Dendrobium tozerense, commonly known as the white gemini orchid, is an epiphytic or lithophytic orchid in the family Orchidaceae. It has thin, wiry stems, stiff leaves and pairs of star-shaped, white flowers. It grows in rainforest in tropical North Queensland, Australia.

== Description ==
Dendrobium tozerense is an epiphytic or lithophytic herb that has crowded wiry stems 200–600 mm (8–20 in) long and about 2 mm (0.08 in) wide. The leaves are scattered along the stems and are light green, linear to lance-shaped, 50–80 mm (2.0–3.1 in) long and 6–8 mm (0.24–0.31 in) wide. The flowers are white, arranged in pairs in leaf axils and are resupinate, star-shaped and 30–35 mm (1.2–1.4 in) long and wide. The dorsal sepal is 20–25 mm (0.79–0.98 in) long, about 6 mm (0.2 in) wide and the lateral sepals are 14–18 mm (0.55–0.71 in) long, about 5 mm (0.20 in) wide. The sepals and petals are 12–15 mm (0.47–0.59 in) long, about 2 mm (0.08 in) wide, thin and pointed. The labellum is 7–10 mm (0.3–0.4 in) long, about 4 mm (0.2 in) wide, has a few scattered hairs and three lobes. The side lobes are erect, rounded triangular and the middle lobe has a blunt tip and crinkled edges. Flowering occurs sporadically throughout the year.

== Taxonomy and naming ==
Dendrobium tozerense was first formally described in 1977 by Bill Lavarack from a specimen collected from Tozer's Gap on Cape York Peninsula and the description was published in the journal Austrobaileya.

== Distribution and habitat ==
The white gemini orchid grows on trees and rocks in rainforest and on cliffs near waterfalls on some Torres Strait Islands and south on the Cape York Peninsula to the Iron Range and Tully.
