= Euthemopsaltria =

Scientific classification
- Kingdom: Animalia
- Phylum: Arthropoda
- Clade: Pancrustacea
- Class: Insecta
- Order: Hemiptera
- Suborder: Auchenorrhyncha
- Superfamily: Cicadoidea
- Family: Cicadidae
- Subfamily: Cicadettinae
- Tribe: Chlorocystini
- Genus: Euthemopsaltria; Moulds, 2014

Genus of cicadas

Euthemopsaltria is a genus of cicadas in the family Cicadidae, subfamily Cicadettinae and tribe Chlorocystini. It is endemic to Australia. It was described in 2014 by Australian entomologist Maxwell Sydney Moulds.

== Species ==
As of 2025 there was one valid species in the genus:

- Euthemopsaltria laeta Moulds, 2014 (Reticulate Bottle Cicada)
