= Thaumastopsaltria globosa =

Scientific classification
- Kingdom: Animalia
- Phylum: Arthropoda
- Clade: Pancrustacea
- Class: Insecta
- Order: Hemiptera
- Suborder: Auchenorrhyncha
- Family: Cicadidae
- Genus: Thaumastopsaltria
- Species: T. globosa

Binomial name
- Thaumastopsaltria globosa (Distant, 1897)

Synonyms
- Acrilla globosa Distant, 1897; Thaumastopsaltria glauca Ashton, 1912

Species of cicada

Thaumastopsaltria globosa is a species of cicada, also known as the slender green growler, in the true cicada family, Cicadettinae subfamily and Chlorocystini tribe. The species is native to Australia and New Guinea. It was described in 1897 by English entomologist William Lucas Distant.

== Etymology ==
The specific epithet globosa (Latin: “round”) refers to the cicadas’ appearance.

== Description ==
The length of the forewing is 23–31 mm.

== Distribution and habitat ==
The species occurs from southern New Guinea and the Torres Strait Islands southwards to Daintree in north-eastern Queensland, as well as from Groote Eylandt in the Northern Territory. The associated habitat is tropical rainforest.

== Behaviour ==
The cicadas are xylem feeders. Adult males may be heard from September to June, clinging high on the upper stems of rainforest trees, emitting loud, coarse, whistling calls, especially at dusk.
