= Owra =

Scientific classification
- Kingdom: Animalia
- Phylum: Arthropoda
- Clade: Pancrustacea
- Class: Insecta
- Order: Hemiptera
- Suborder: Auchenorrhyncha
- Superfamily: Cicadoidea
- Family: Cicadidae
- Subfamily: Cicadettinae
- Tribe: Chlorocystini
- Genus: Owra; Ashton, 1912

Genus of cicadas

Owra is a genus of cicadas in the family Cicadidae, subfamily Cicadettinae and tribe Chlorocystini. It is endemic to Australia. It was described in 1912 by Australian entomologist Julian Howard Ashton.

== Species ==
As of 2025 there was one valid species in the genus:

- Owra insignis Ashton, 1912 (Green Ghost)
