= Venustria =

Scientific classification
- Kingdom: Animalia
- Phylum: Arthropoda
- Clade: Pancrustacea
- Class: Insecta
- Order: Hemiptera
- Suborder: Auchenorrhyncha
- Family: Cicadidae
- Subfamily: Cicadettinae
- Tribe: Chlorocystini
- Genus: Venustria; Goding & Froggatt, 1904

Genus of cicadas

Venustria is a genus of cicadas in the family Cicadidae, subfamily Cicadettinae and tribe Chlorocystini. It is endemic to Australia. It was described in 1904 by entomologists Frederic Webster Goding and Walter Wilson Froggatt.

== Species ==
As of 2025 there was one valid species in the genus:

- Venustria superba Golding & Froggatt, 1904 (Frog Cicada)
