= Cystosoma schmeltzi =

Scientific classification
- Kingdom: Animalia
- Phylum: Arthropoda
- Clade: Pancrustacea
- Class: Insecta
- Order: Hemiptera
- Suborder: Auchenorrhyncha
- Family: Cicadidae
- Genus: Cystosoma
- Species: C. schmeltzi

Binomial name
- Cystosoma schmeltzi Distant, 1882

Species of cicada

Cystosoma schmeltzi is a species, or species complex, of cicadas, also known as lesser bladder cicadas, in the true cicada family, Cicadettinae subfamily and Chlorocystini tribe. The species is endemic to Australia. It was described in 1882 by English entomologist William Lucas Distant.

== Description ==
The length of the forewing is 26–36 mm.

== Distribution and habitat ==
The species complex occurs from near Palmerville, Mossman, Mount Garnet and Townsville coastally southwards to Rockhampton and westwards to Blackall and Stanthorpe in Queensland, and to Gunnedah in New South Wales. The associated habitat is dry sclerophyll forest and woodland, as well as small trees and shrubs around rural towns.

== Behaviour ==
The cicadas are xylem feeders. Adult males may be heard from September to March, emitting high-pitched, broken rattling or chanting calls at dusk.
