= Thaumastopsaltria =

Scientific classification
- Kingdom: Animalia
- Phylum: Arthropoda
- Clade: Pancrustacea
- Class: Insecta
- Order: Hemiptera
- Suborder: Auchenorrhyncha
- Superfamily: Cicadoidea
- Family: Cicadidae
- Subfamily: Cicadettinae
- Tribe: Chlorocystini
- Genus: Thaumastopsaltria; Kirkaldy, 1900

Genus of cicadas

Thaumastopsaltria is a genus of cicadas, also known as growlers, in the family Cicadidae, subfamily Cicadettinae and tribe Chlorocystini. It is native to Australia and New Guinea. It was described in 1900 by English entomologist George Willis Kirkaldy.

== Species ==
As of 2025 there were eight valid species in the genus:

- Thaumastopsaltria adipata (Stål, 1863)
- Thaumastopsaltria globosa (Distant, 1897) (Slender Green Growler)
- Thaumastopsaltria lanceola Boer, 1992
- Thaumastopsaltria pneumatica Boer, 1992
- Thaumastopsaltria sarissa Boer, 1992
- Thaumastopsaltria sicula Boer, 1992
- Thaumastopsaltria smithersi Moulds, 2012 (Robust Green Growler)
- Thaumastopsaltria spelunca Boer, 1992
