= Dendrobium clementsii =

Cape York crimp orchid

Scientific classification
- Kingdom: Plantae
- Clade: Embryophytes
- Clade: Tracheophytes
- Clade: Spermatophytes
- Clade: Angiosperms
- Clade: Monocots
- Order: Asparagales
- Family: Orchidaceae
- Subfamily: Epidendroideae
- Genus: Dendrobium
- Species: D. clementsii

Binomial name
- Dendrobium clementsii (D.L.Jones) J.M.H.Shaw

Synonyms
- Flickingeria clementsii D.L.Jones

Species of orchid

Dendrobium clementsii, commonly known as the Cape York crimp orchid, is a species of epiphytic or lithophytic orchid that is endemic to tropical North Queensland, Australia. It has long stems, tapering pseudobulbs each with a thin, leathery dark green leaf and clusters of short-lived, cream-coloured flowers with a purple labellum.

== Description ==
Dendrobium clementsii is an epiphytic or lithophytic herb with aerial stems up to 1.0 m (3.3 ft) long. The pseudobulbs are dark green to yellowish and furrowed, decreasing in length and width along the stem from 300 mm (12 in) long and 5 mm (0.20 in) wide. Each pseudobulb has a single thin, leathery, dark green leaf 150–220 mm (5.9–8.7 in) long and 70–100 mm (2.8–3.9 in) wide on the end. Clusters of cream-coloured flowers, 14–20 mm (0.55–0.79 in) long and 20–25 mm (0.79–0.98 in) wide are arranged at the base of the leaves. The sepals are lance-shaped, 10–12 mm (0.39–0.47 in) long and 4–5 mm (0.16–0.20 in) wide and the petals are a similar length but only about 1 mm (0.039 in) wide. The labellum is purple, 13–15 mm (0.51–0.59 in) long, 5–6 mm (0.20–0.24 in) wide and has three lobes. The side lobes are about 8 mm (0.31 in) and have a short fringe. The middle lobe has spreading wavy, hairs about 5 mm (0.20 in) on its tip. Flowering occurs sporadically throughout the year and the flowers last less than a day.

== Taxonomy and naming ==
The Cape York crimp orchid was first formally described in 2004 by David Jones who gave it the name Flickingeria clementsii, published in The Orchadian. In 2014, Julian Mark Hugh Shaw changed the name to Dendrobium clementsii.

== Distribution and habitat ==
The Cape York crimp orchid grows on rocks and trees in rainforest on the Iron and McIlwraith Ranges on the Cape York Peninsula.
