= Guineapsaltria =

Scientific classification
- Kingdom: Animalia
- Phylum: Arthropoda
- Clade: Pancrustacea
- Class: Insecta
- Order: Hemiptera
- Suborder: Auchenorrhyncha
- Family: Cicadidae
- Subfamily: Cicadettinae
- Tribe: Chlorocystini
- Genus: Guineapsaltria; Boer, 1993

Genus of cicadas

Guineapsaltria is a genus of cicadas in the family Cicadidae, subfamily Cicadettinae and tribe Chlorocystini. It is native to Australia and New Guinea. It was described in 1993 by Dutch entomologist Arnold J. de Boer.

== Species ==
As of 2025 there was one valid species in the genus:

- Guineapsaltria flava (Goding & Froggatt, 1904) (Green Fairy)
