= Gymnotympana varicolor =

Scientific classification
- Kingdom: Animalia
- Phylum: Arthropoda
- Clade: Pancrustacea
- Class: Insecta
- Order: Hemiptera
- Suborder: Auchenorrhyncha
- Family: Cicadidae
- Genus: Gymnotympana
- Species: G. varicolor

Binomial name
- Gymnotympana varicolor (Distant, 1907)

Synonyms
- Baeturia varicolor Distant, 1907

Species of cicada

Gymnotympana varicolor is a species of cicada, also known as the red belly, in the true cicada family, Cicadettinae subfamily and Chlorocystini tribe. The species is endemic to Australia. It was described in 1907 by English entomologist William Lucas Distant.

== Etymology ==
The specific epithet varicolor (Latin: “varicoloured”) refers to the cicadas’ colouration.

== Description ==
The length of the forewing is 20–29 mm.

== Distribution and habitat ==
The species occurs in north-eastern Queensland from Ingham and the Atherton Tableland northwards to Cooktown, with other populations at Coen and the tip of Cape York. The associated habitat is tropical rainforest.

== Behaviour ==
The cicadas are xylem feeders. Adult males may be heard from October to May, clinging to the foliage of rainforest vegetation, emitting clicking calls.
