= Thaumastopsaltria smithersi =

Scientific classification
- Kingdom: Animalia
- Phylum: Arthropoda
- Clade: Pancrustacea
- Class: Insecta
- Order: Hemiptera
- Suborder: Auchenorrhyncha
- Family: Cicadidae
- Genus: Thaumastopsaltria
- Species: T. smithersi

Binomial name
- Thaumastopsaltria smithersi (Moulds, 2012)

Species of cicada

Thaumastopsaltria smithersi is a species of cicada, also known as the robust green growler, in the true cicada family, Cicadettinae subfamily and Chlorocystini tribe. The species is endemic to Australia. It was described in 2012 by Australian entomologist Maxwell Sydney Moulds.

== Etymology ==
The specific epithet smithersi honours Australian entomologist Courtenay Smithers.

== Description ==
The length of the forewing is 23–31 mm.

== Distribution and habitat ==
The species occurs in the Wet Tropics of Queensland from Cooktown southwards to Cardwell. The associated habitat is tropical rainforest.

== Behaviour ==
The cicadas are xylem feeders. Adult males may be heard from October to February, clinging high on the upper stems of rainforest trees, emitting loud, coarse, whistling calls, especially at dusk.
