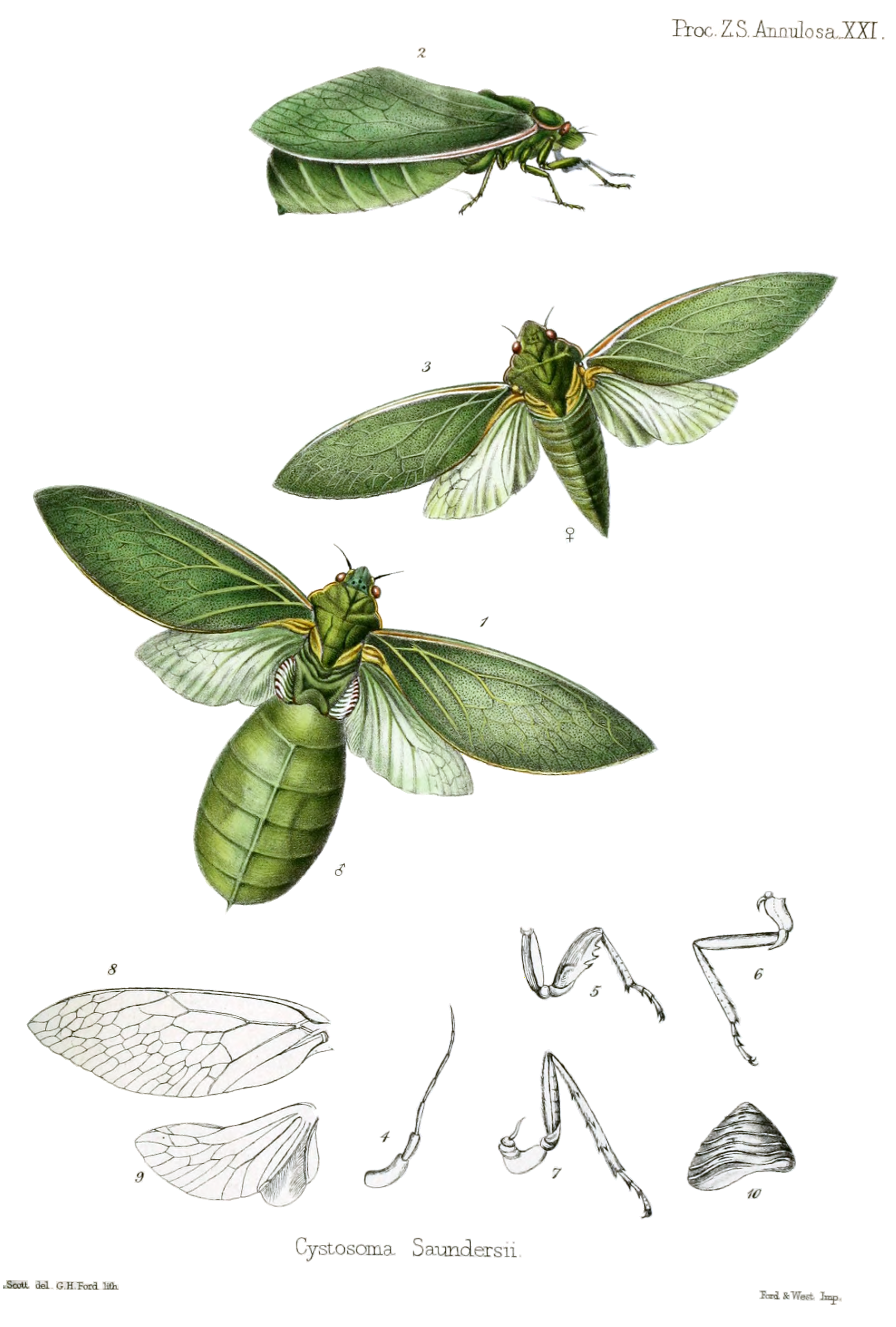
- Male and female (entire), and details

Scientific classification
- Kingdom: Animalia
- Phylum: Arthropoda
- Clade: Pancrustacea
- Class: Insecta
- Order: Hemiptera
- Suborder: Auchenorrhyncha
- Family: Cicadidae
- Genus: Cystosoma
- Species: C. saundersii

Binomial name
- Cystosoma saundersii Westwood, 1842

Audio
- Song of Cystosoma saundersii

= Cystosoma saundersii =

Species of true bug

Cystosoma saundersii, commonly known as the bladder cicada, is a species of cicada native to New South Wales and Queensland in Australia.

Cystosoma saundersii is nocturnal and employs camouflage as a defence tactic.

== Life cycle ==
Their median life cycle from egg to natural adult death is around four years.

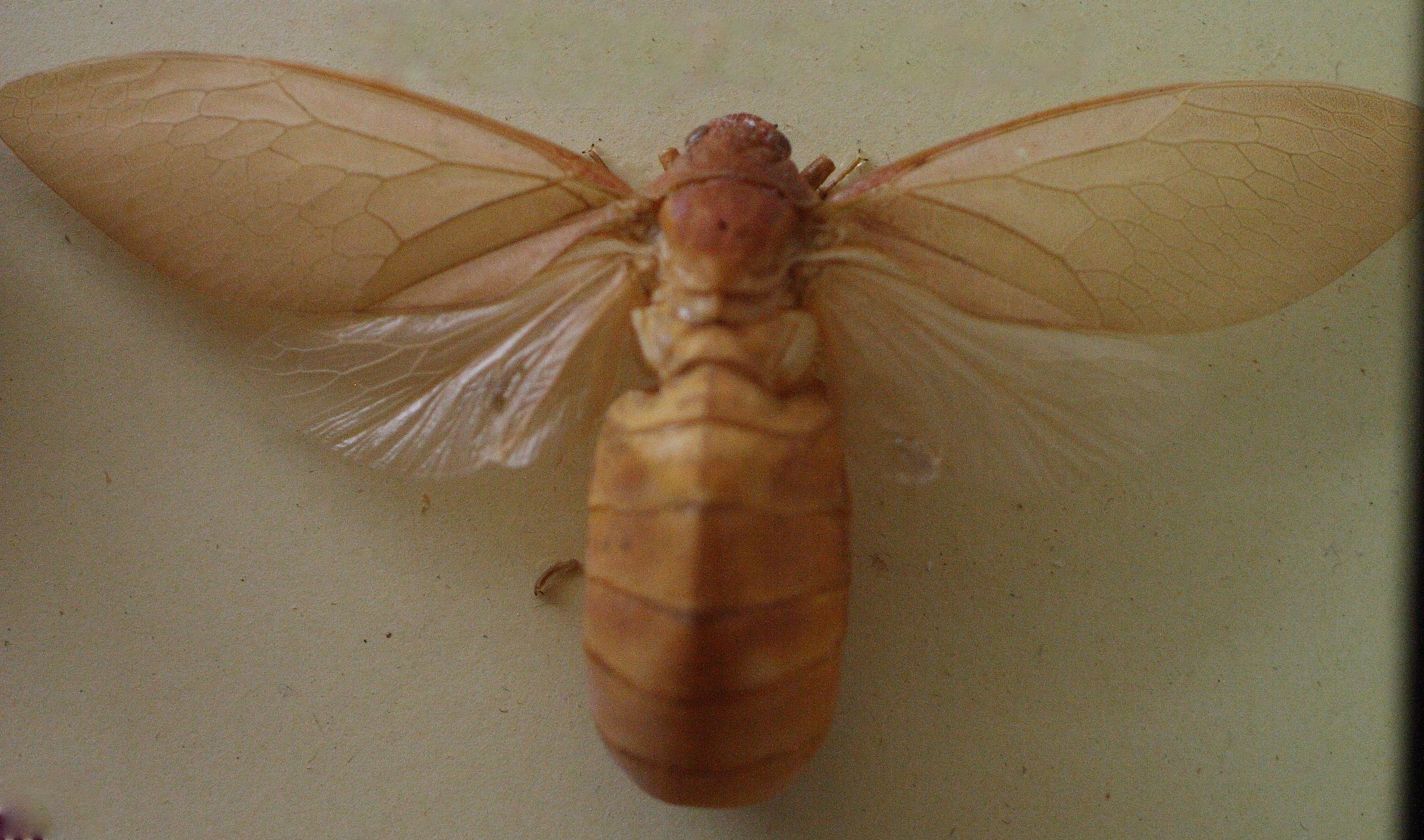
Male specimen, Australian Museum

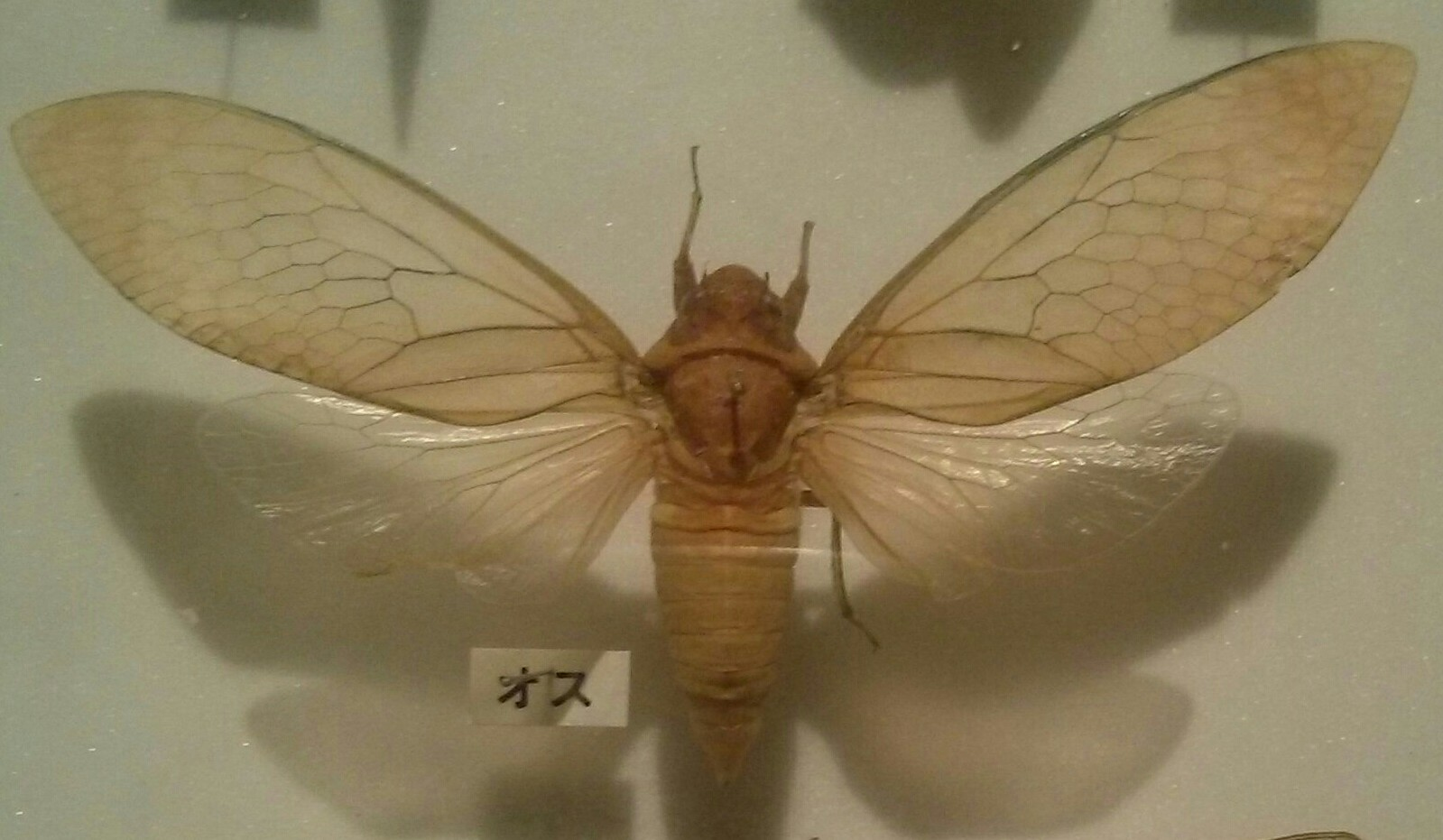
Female specimen, Kanagawa Museum

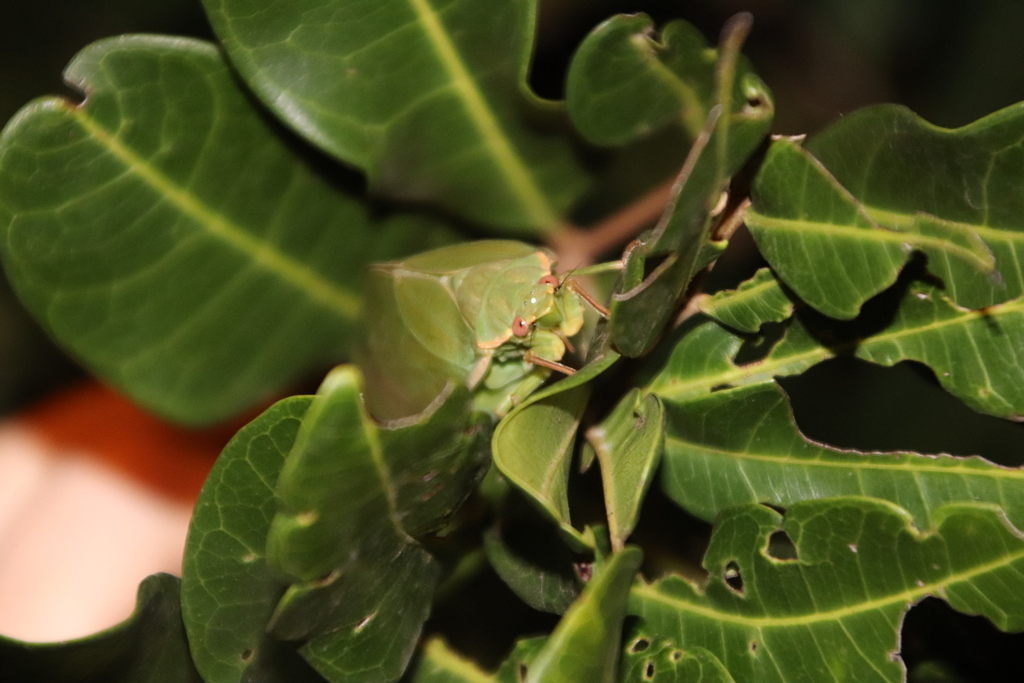
Cystosoma saundersii camouflaging itself as a leaf.
