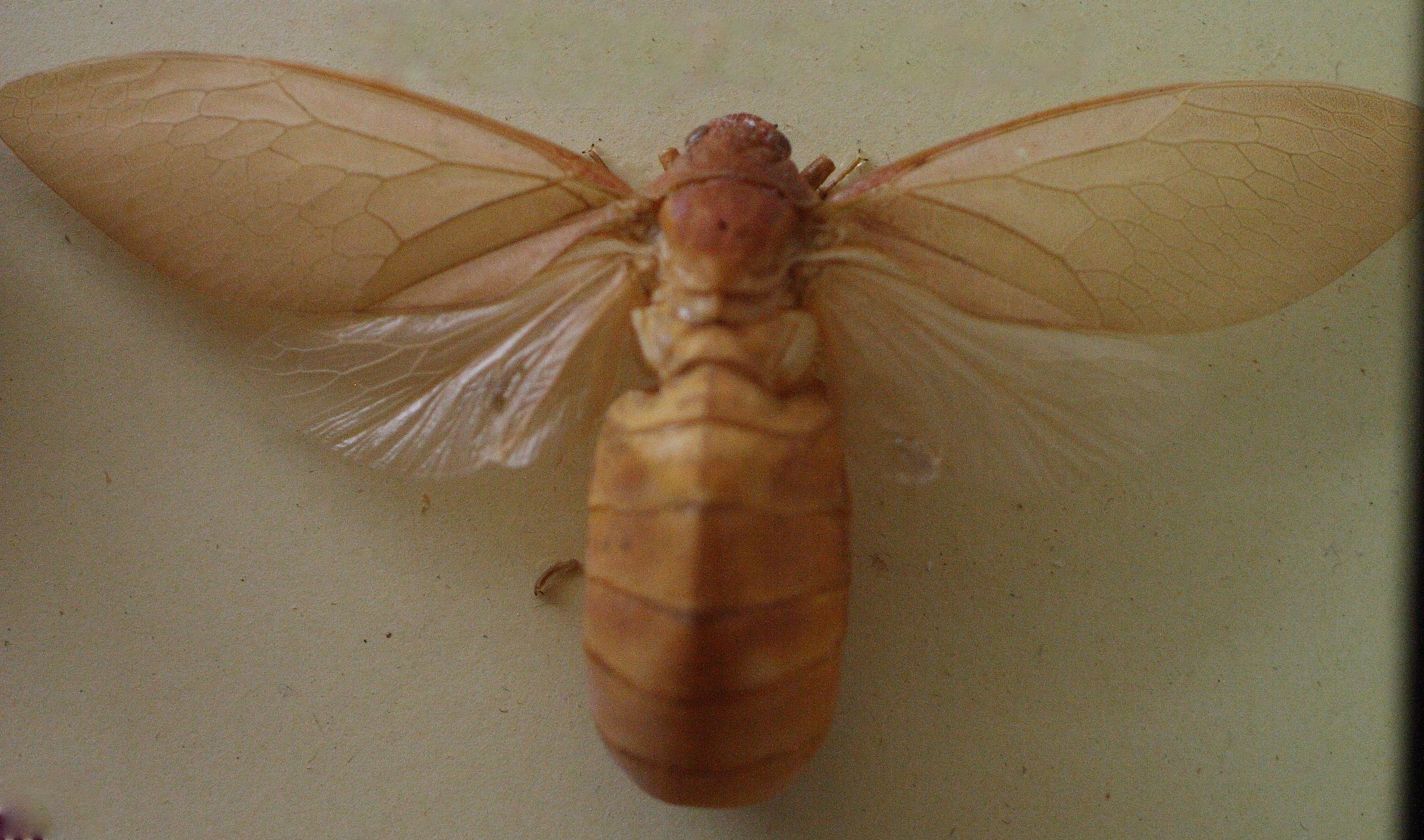
- Cystosoma saundersii specimen in the Australian Museum

Scientific classification
- Kingdom: Animalia
- Phylum: Arthropoda
- Clade: Pancrustacea
- Class: Insecta
- Order: Hemiptera
- Suborder: Auchenorrhyncha
- Family: Cicadidae
- Subfamily: Cicadettinae
- Tribe: Chlorocystini
- Genus: Cystosoma; Westwood, 1842

= Cystosoma =

Genus of true bugs

Cystosoma is a genus of cicadas, also known as bladder cicadas, in the Cicadinae subfamily and native to Australia. Two species have been described.

== Species ==
- Cystosoma saundersii (Westwood, 1842) (Bladder Cicada)
- Cystosoma schmeltzi Distant, 1882 (Lesser Bladder Cicada)

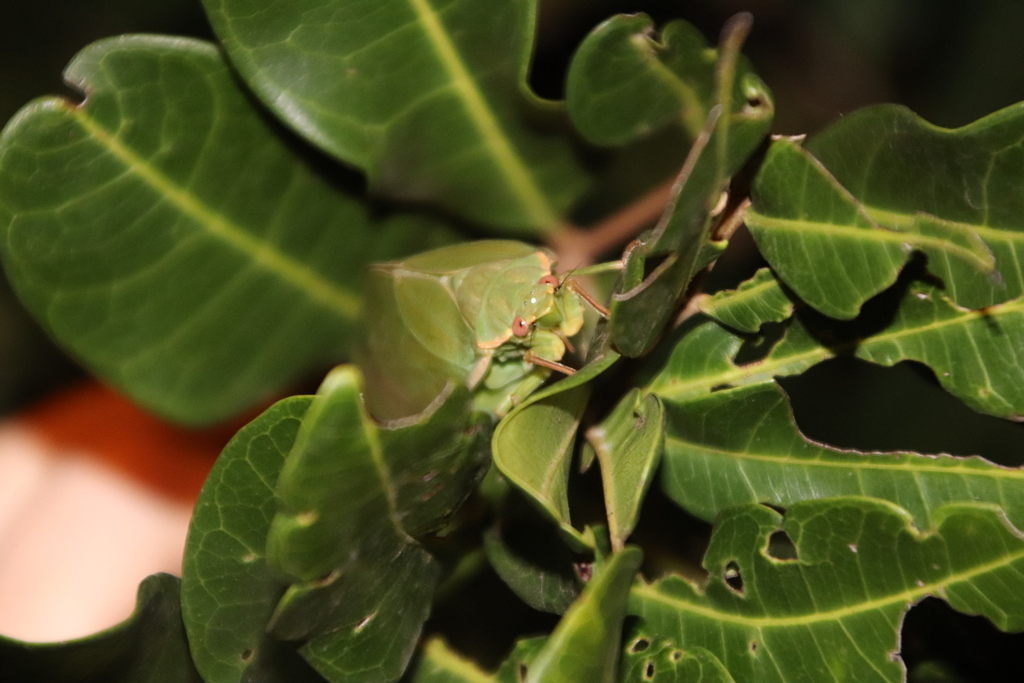
Cystosoma saundersii camouflaging itself as a leaf
