= Baeturia hardyi =

Scientific classification
- Kingdom: Animalia
- Phylum: Arthropoda
- Clade: Pancrustacea
- Class: Insecta
- Order: Hemiptera
- Suborder: Auchenorrhyncha
- Family: Cicadidae
- Genus: Baeturia
- Species: B. hardyi

Binomial name
- Baeturia hardyi (De Boer, 1996)

Species of true bug

Baeturia hardyi is a species of cicada named for comedian Oliver Hardy. A similar species, B. laureli, was named after his partner Stan Laurel.

== See also ==
- List of organisms named after famous people (born 1800–1899)
