= Gordon's Mine and Mill =

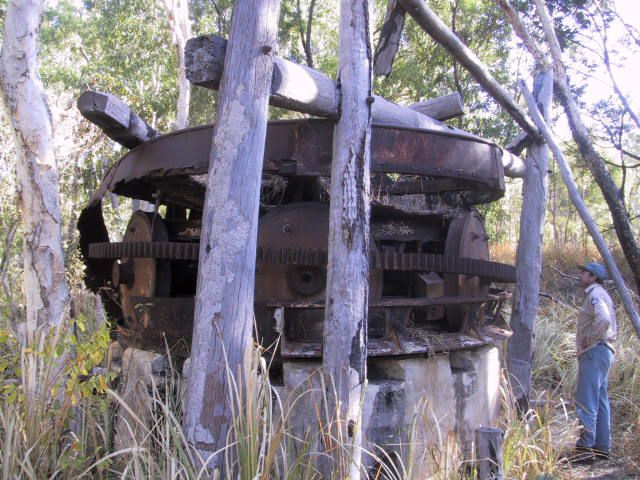
- Gordon's Mine and Mill, 2002

- Location within Queensland Location within Australia
- 12.7153°S 143.2977°E
- Location: Iron Range, Shire of Cook, Queensland, Australia

History
- Design period: 1919 - 1930s (interwar period)
- Built: c. 1936 - 1950s

Queensland Heritage Register
- Official name: Gordon's Mine and Mill, Iron Range Mine and Mill
- Type: state heritage (archaeological)
- Designated: 13 December 2002
- Reference no.: 601860
- Significant period: c. 1936-1950s (fabric, historical)
- Significant components: track, machinery/plant/equipment - mining/mineral processing, mounting block/stand, cyanide plant/cyanide vat, adit, terracing, flue

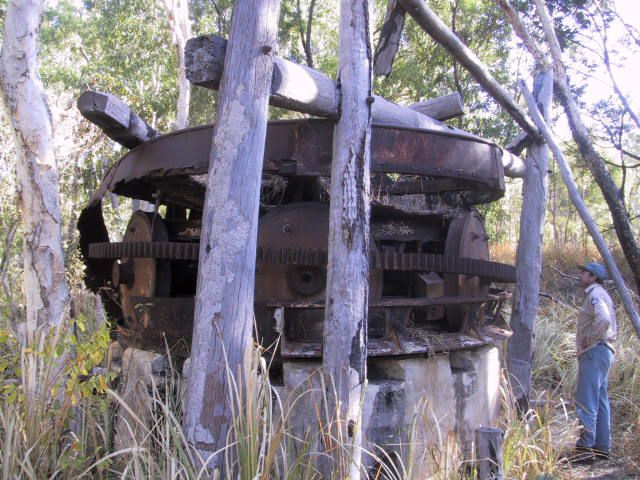

Gordon's Mine and Mill is a heritage-listed mine at Iron Range, Shire of Cook, Queensland, Australia. It was built from c. 1936 to 1950s. It is also known as Iron Range Mine and Mill. It was added to the Queensland Heritage Register on 13 December 2002.

== History ==
In early 1934, Jack Gordon prospected the Iron Range locality from the Packers Creek field near Portland Roads. In June 1934, he followed a gold trail up a tributary of Gordon Creek, a branch of the Claudie River, and discovered what was later called the Iron Range Reef.

Within two years, the region was a hive of activity with 45 men working along an 8 kilometres (5.0 mi) strip. Although the original ore was shipped and railed to the Venus battery at Charters Towers for treatment, the Iron Range mill was in full operation by November 1936 after a Huntington mill was erected by Jack Gordon at the mine following great difficulties in transportation. This was soon followed by crushing machines on the Golden Gate and Scarlet Pimpernel leases. In 1938, the Iron Range mill operated for most of the year; a cyanide plant was installed and 29 men were employed.

Gordon's Reef outcrops on top of a steep ridge and the main tunnel was driven to cut the ore body approximately 57 metres (187 ft) below the ridge. Up to 1939, development work consisted of numerous tunnels and drives, which officially yielded 2,005 ounces (56,800 g) of gold from 210 long tons (210 t) of ore. Between 1938 and 1956, the Mines Department annual reports indicate that a total of 10,428 long tons (10,595 t) of ore was crushed from the Iron Range and yielded 4,525 ounces (128,300 g) of bullion gold and 122 ounces (3,500 g) of fine gold. Although the vast majority was derived from Gordon's mine, some of the returns may relate to the surrounding leases.

== Description ==
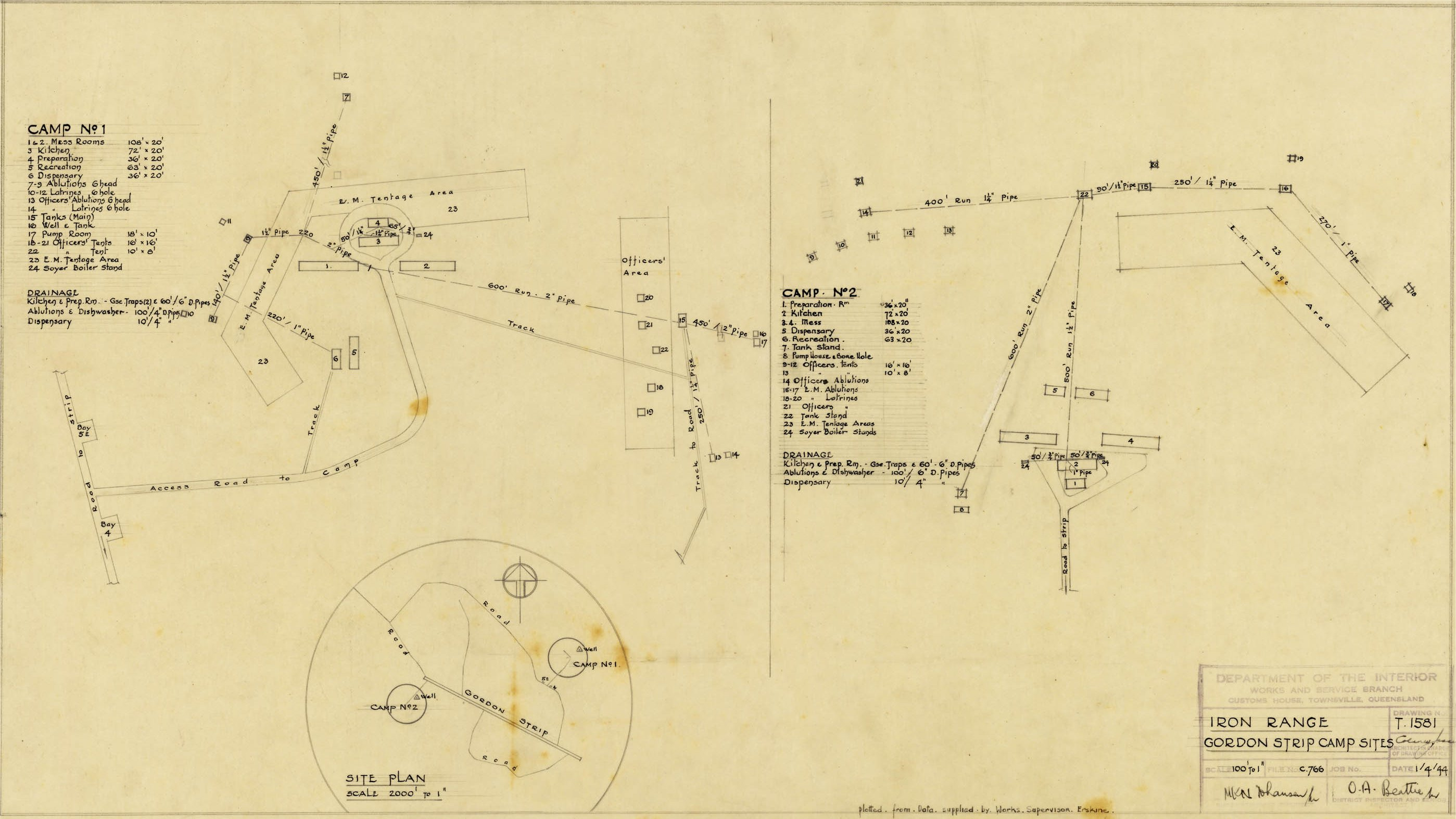
Site map, 1944

The place is located in an area of dense regrowth rainforest on a hillslope descending to a tributary of Gordon Creek. Access tracks intersect the site on two levels. There are three mine adits on the upper level. The middle adit, or main tunnel, has caved at its entrance. An air receiver is located at the entrance to the main tunnel.

The mill with most of the surviving plant is located either side of the lower access track. Components include, a building site benched into the hillside which contains several surviving bush timber shed uprights and the body of a Roots blower. The lower track passes through the middle of the mill site which contains a partly intact and badly corroded Huntington mill on a concrete base, and a suction gas producer with associated concrete engine mounts. A series of large corrugated iron cyaniding tanks are located along the creek bank below the mill. Remains of at least five cyanide tanks are evident together with a small concrete structure which appears to be a retort flue.

Surviving plant includes:

- Huntington mill - Manufactured by Babcock & Wilcox Ltd. Regent Park N.S.W.
- Gas producer - no brand (No. 8890)
- Roots blower (not in situ) - No 1 Roots Blower Alldays & Ions Ltd Birmingham England.
- Air receiver - no brand.

== Heritage listing ==
Gordon's Mine and Mill was listed on the Queensland Heritage Register on 13 December 2002 having satisfied the following criteria.

The place is important in demonstrating the evolution or pattern of Queensland's history.

Gordon's mine and mill is significant for demonstrating the material evidence of a successful 1930's mineral exploration and development project that resulted in the support of gold mining operations over a period of twenty years in difficult rainforest terrain on northern Cape York Peninsula.

The place demonstrates rare, uncommon or endangered aspects of Queensland's cultural heritage.

The milling plant remaining on site is now very rare in North Queensland: the Huntington mill is one of only two recorded in North Queensland, while the Roots blower is the only one recorded in association with a North Queensland mining place.

The place is important in demonstrating the principal characteristics of a particular class of cultural places.

The surviving plant and archaeology of the site demonstrate quartz mining and milling processes in a tropical rainforest, and rainforest regrowth.
