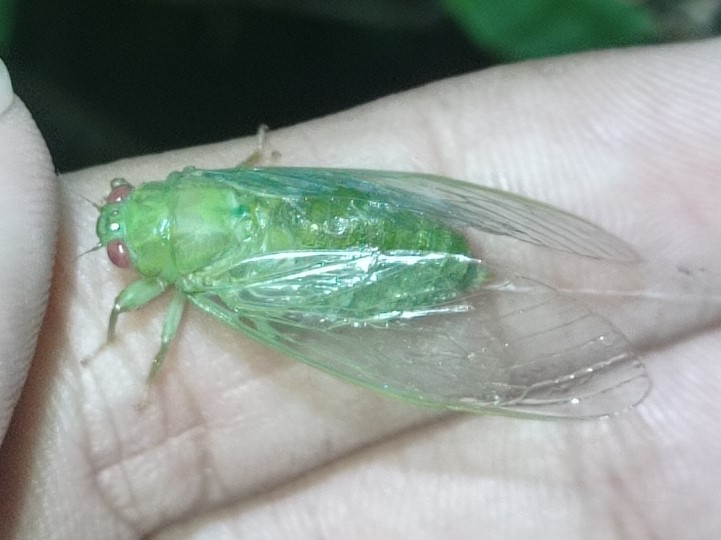

Scientific classification
- Kingdom: Animalia
- Phylum: Arthropoda
- Clade: Pancrustacea
- Class: Insecta
- Order: Hemiptera
- Suborder: Auchenorrhyncha
- Family: Cicadidae
- Genus: Baeturia
- Species: B. laureli

Binomial name
- Baeturia laureli (De Boer, 1996)

= Baeturia laureli =

Species of true bug

Baeturia laureli is a species of cicada named after comedian Stan Laurel. A similar species, B. hardyi, was named after his partner Oliver Hardy.

== See also ==
- List of organisms named after famous people (born 1800–1899)
