= Muda (cicada) =

Scientific classification
- Kingdom: Animalia
- Phylum: Arthropoda
- Clade: Pancrustacea
- Class: Insecta
- Order: Hemiptera
- Suborder: Auchenorrhyncha
- Family: Cicadidae
- Genus: Muda

Genus of true bugs

Muda is a genus of cicadas in the family Cicadidae. There are at least four described species in Muda.

== Species ==
These four species belong to the genus Muda:

- Muda kuroiwae (Matsumura, 1913)^{c g}
- Muda obtusa (Walker, F., 1858)^{c g}
- Muda tua Schouten, Duffels & Zaidi, 2004^{c g}
- Muda virguncula (Walker, F., 1857)^{c g}

Data sources: i = ITIS, c = Catalogue of Life, g = GBIF, b = Bugguide.net
