= Akamba (cicada) =

Scientific classification
- Kingdom: Animalia
- Phylum: Arthropoda
- Clade: Pancrustacea
- Class: Insecta
- Order: Hemiptera
- Suborder: Auchenorrhyncha
- Family: Cicadidae
- Genus: Akamba

Genus of true bugs

Akamba is a genus of cicadas in the family Cicadidae. There is at least one described species in Akamba, A. aethiopica.
