= Decebalus (cicada) =

Scientific classification
- Kingdom: Animalia
- Phylum: Arthropoda
- Clade: Pancrustacea
- Class: Insecta
- Order: Hemiptera
- Suborder: Auchenorrhyncha
- Family: Cicadidae
- Genus: Decebalus

Genus of insects

Decebalus is a genus of cicadas in the family Cicadidae. There is at least one described species in Decebalus, D. ugandanus.
