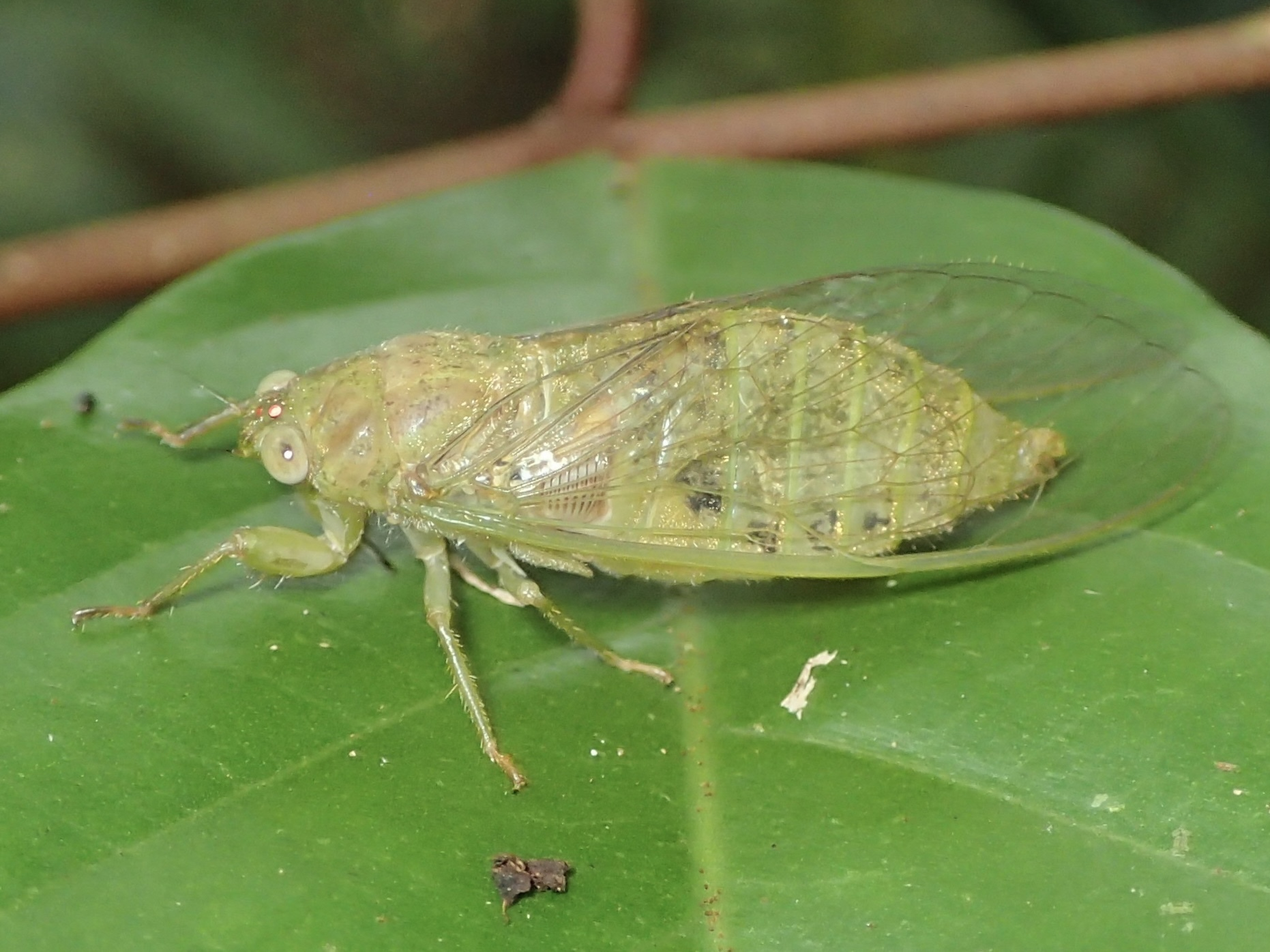
- Baeturia sedlacekorum

Scientific classification
- Kingdom: Animalia
- Phylum: Arthropoda
- Clade: Pancrustacea
- Class: Insecta
- Order: Hemiptera
- Suborder: Auchenorrhyncha
- Family: Cicadidae
- Subfamily: Cicadettinae
- Tribe: Chlorocystini
- Genus: Baeturia; Stål, 1866

= Baeturia (cicada) =

Genus of true bugs

Baeturia is a genus of cicadas in the family Cicadidae. There are at least 60 described species in the genus Baeturia.

== Species ==
These 68 species belong to the genus Baeturia:

- Baeturia arabuensis Blote, 1960^{c g}
- Baeturia bemmeleni Boer, 1994^{c g}
- Baeturia bicolorata Distant, 1892^{c g}
- Baeturia bilebanarai Boer, 1989^{c g}
- Baeturia bipunctata Blote, 1960^{c g}
- Baeturia biroi Boer, 1994^{c g}
- Baeturia bismarkensis Boer, 1989^{c g}
- Baeturia bloetei Boer, 1989^{c g}
- Baeturia boulardi Boer, 1989^{c g}
- Baeturia brandti Boer, 1989^{c g}
- Baeturia brongersmai Blote, 1960^{c g}
- Baeturia colossea Boer, 1994^{c g}
- Baeturia conviva (Stål, 1861)^{c g}
- Baeturia cristovalensis Boer, 1989^{c g}
- Baeturia daviesi Boer, 1994^{c g}
- Baeturia edauberti Boulard, 1979^{c g}
- Baeturia exhausta (Guerin-Meneville, 1831)^{c g}
- Baeturia fortuini Boer, 1994^{c g}
- Baeturia furcillata Boer, 1992^{c g}
- Baeturia galeata Boer, 2000^{c g}
- Baeturia gibberosa Boer, 1994^{c g}
- Baeturia gressitti Boer, 1989^{c g}
- Baeturia guttulinervis Blote, 1960^{c g}
- Baeturia guttulipennis Blote, 1960^{c g}
- Baeturia hamiltoni Boer, 1994^{c g}
- Baeturia hardyi Boer, 1986^{c g}
- Baeturia hartonoi Boer, 1994^{c g}
- Baeturia inconstans Boer, 1994^{c g}
- Baeturia intermedia Boer, 1982^{c g}
- Baeturia karkarensis Boer, 1992^{c g}
- Baeturia laminifer Blote, 1960^{c g}
- Baeturia laperousei Boulard, 2005^{c g}
- Baeturia laureli Boer, 1986^{c g}
- Baeturia lorentzi Boer, 1992^{c g}
- Baeturia loriae Distant, 1897^{c g}
- Baeturia maai Boer, 1994^{c g}
- Baeturia macgillavryi Boer, 1989^{c g}
- Baeturia maddisoni Duffels, 1988^{c g}
- Baeturia mamillata Blote, 1960^{c g}
- Baeturia manusensis Boer, 1989^{c g}
- Baeturia marginata Boer, 1989^{c g}
- Baeturia marmorata Blote, 1960^{c g}
- Baeturia mendanai Boer, 1989^{c g}
- Baeturia mussauensis Boer, 1989^{c g}
- Baeturia nasuta Blote, 1960^{c g}
- Baeturia papuensis Boer, 1989^{c g}
- Baeturia parva Blote, 1960^{c g}
- Baeturia pigrami Boer, 1994^{c g}
- Baeturia polhemi Boer, 2000^{c g}
- Baeturia quadrifida (Walker, F., 1868)^{c g}
- Baeturia reijnhoudti Boer, 1989^{c g}
- Baeturia retracta Boer, 1994^{c g}
- Baeturia roonensis Boer, 1994^{c g}
- Baeturia rossi Boer, 1994^{c g}
- Baeturia rotumae Duffels, 1988^{c g}
- Baeturia rufula Blote, 1960^{c g}
- Baeturia schulzi Schmidt, E., 1926^{c g}
- Baeturia sedlacekorum Boer, 1989^{c g}
- Baeturia silveri Boer, 1994^{c g}
- Baeturia splendida Boer, 1994^{c g}
- Baeturia tenuispina Blote, 1960^{c g}
- Baeturia turgida Boer, 1992^{c g}
- Baeturia uveiensis Boulard, 1996^{c g}
- Baeturia vanderhammeni Blote, 1960^{c g}
- Baeturia versicolor Boer, 1994^{c g}
- Baeturia viridis Blote, 1960^{c g}
- Baeturia wauensis Boer, 1994^{c g}
- Baeturia wegeneri Boer, 1994^{c g}

Data sources: i = ITIS, c = Catalogue of Life, g = GBIF, b = Bugguide.net
