= Iron Range, Queensland =

Locality in Queensland, Australia

Iron Range
- Suburb
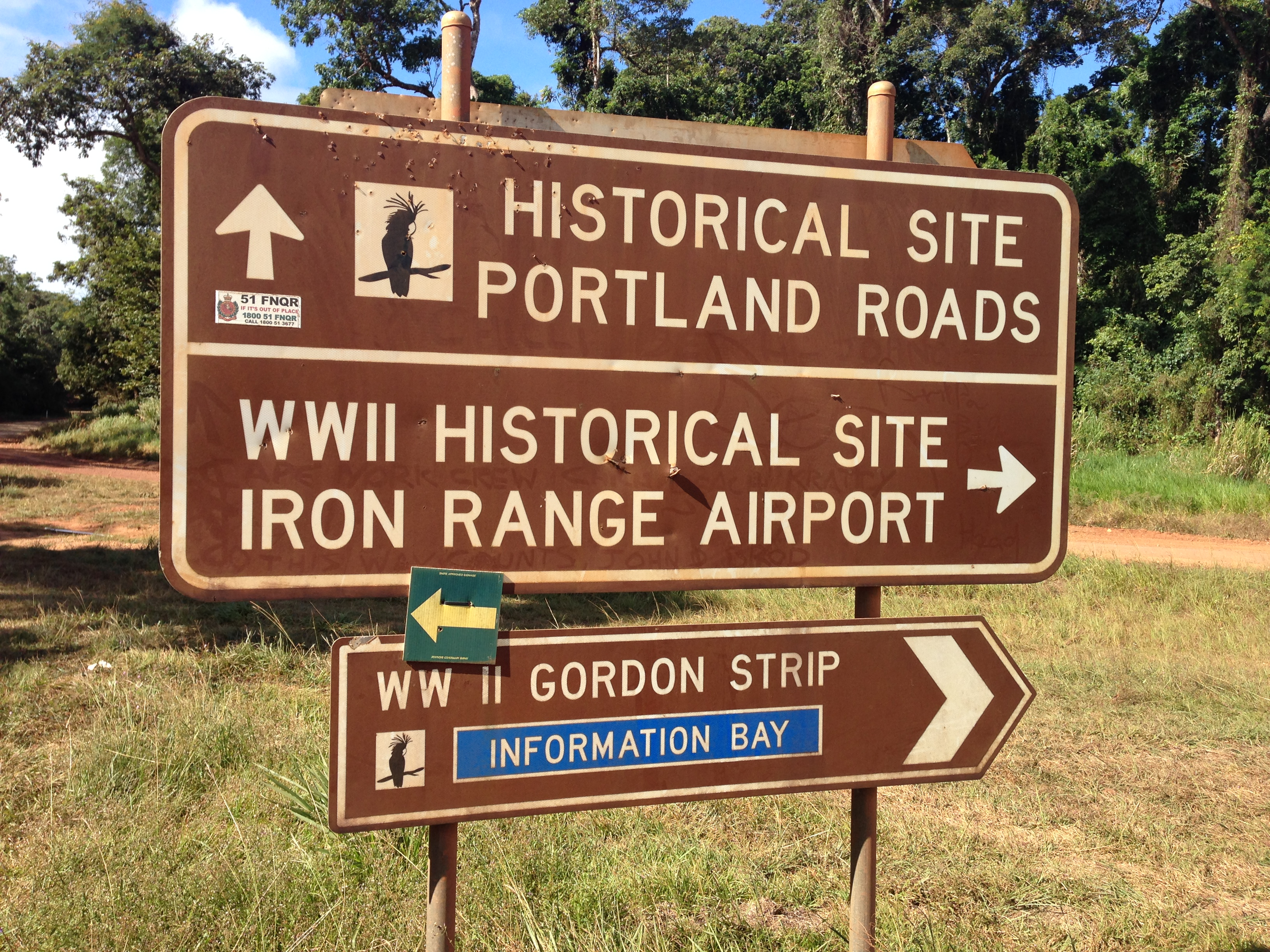
- Road sign at the junction of Lockhart River Road and Portland Road, 2014

- Interactive map of Iron Range
- Coordinates: 12.6544°S 143.3280°E
- Country: Australia
- State: Queensland
- LGA: Shire of Cook
- Location: 15.6 km (9.7 mi) NNW of Lockhart River; 262 km (163 mi) E of Weipa; 591 km (367 mi) NNW of Cooktown; 706 km (439 mi) NNW of Cairns; 2,440 km (1,520 mi) NNW of Brisbane

Government
  - State electorate: Cook
  - Federal division: Leichhardt

Area
  - Total: 738.5 km^{2} (285.1 sq mi)

Population
  - Total: 30 (2021 census)
  - Density: 0.041/km^{2} (0.105/sq mi)
- Time zone: UTC+10:00 (AEST)
Suburbs around Iron Range
Shelburne	Coral Sea	Coral Sea
Lockhart River	Iron Range	Coral Sea
Lockhart River	Lockhart River	Lockhart River

Iron Range is a coastal locality in the Shire of Cook, Queensland, Australia. The town of Portland Road is on a north-east headland in the locality. In the 2021 census, Iron Range had a population of 30 people.

== Geography ==
Iron Range is on the north-east coast of the Cape York Peninsula.

Weymouth Bay is off the north-eastern coast of locality.

The town of Portland Road is on a north-east headland in the locality (12.5975°S 143.4111°E).

Apart from the Portland Road area, most of the locality of Iron Range is occupied by the Kutini Payamu National Park (formerly the Iron Range National Park).

The locality has the following headlands:

- Cape Griffith (12.6781°S 143.4177°E)
- Cape Weymouth (12.6127°S 143.4377°E)

=== Mountains ===
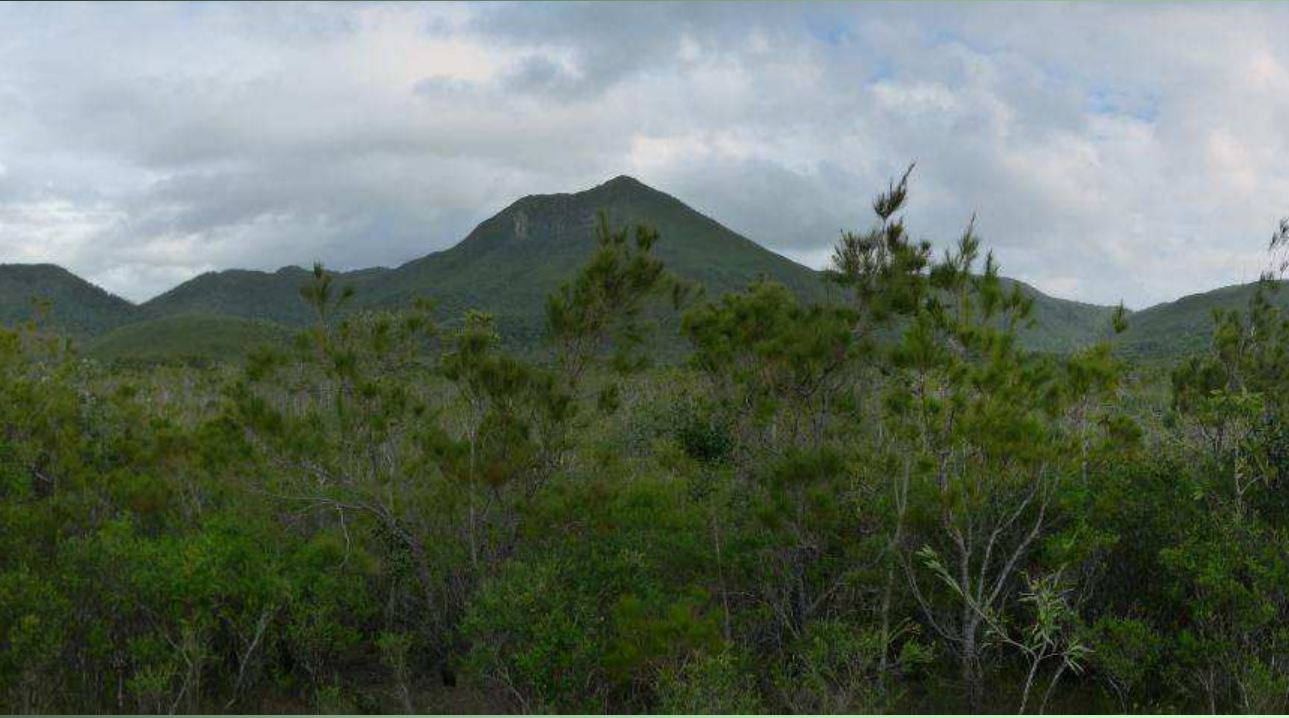
Mount Tozer, 2014

The locality has the following mountains:

- Aylen Hills (12.6016°S 143.4148°E)
- Barrett Hill (12.5218°S 143.2466°E) 233 metres (764 ft)
- Black Hill (12.5782°S 143.2467°E)
- Briar Hill (12.5980°S 143.2601°E) 134 metres (440 ft)
- Ham Hill (12.7232°S 143.3196°E) 115 metres (377 ft)
- Joyce Hill (12.6032°S 143.2825°E) 150 metres (490 ft)
- Lambert Hill (12.7008°S 143.3812°E) 60 metres (200 ft)
- Lamond Hill (12.7208°S 143.2936°E) 191 metres (627 ft)
- Mount Dobson (12.6702°S 143.2197°E) 461 metres (1,512 ft)
- Mount Tozer (12.7525°S 143.2105°E) 543 metres (1,781 ft)
- North Pap (12.7111°S 143.2179°E) 466 metres (1,529 ft)
- Ogilvie Hill (12.6533°S 143.3471°E) 118 metres (387 ft)
- Philip Hill (12.7322°S 143.2946°E) 150 metres (490 ft)
- Red Hill (12.5982°S 143.3168°E)
- Robyn Hill (12.6115°S 143.3009°E)
- Simpson Hill (12.5091°S 143.2664°E) 106 metres (348 ft)
- South Pap (12.7200°S 143.2237°E) 410 metres (1,350 ft)
- Tattam Hill (12.6858°S 143.2777°E) 70 metres (230 ft)

== History ==
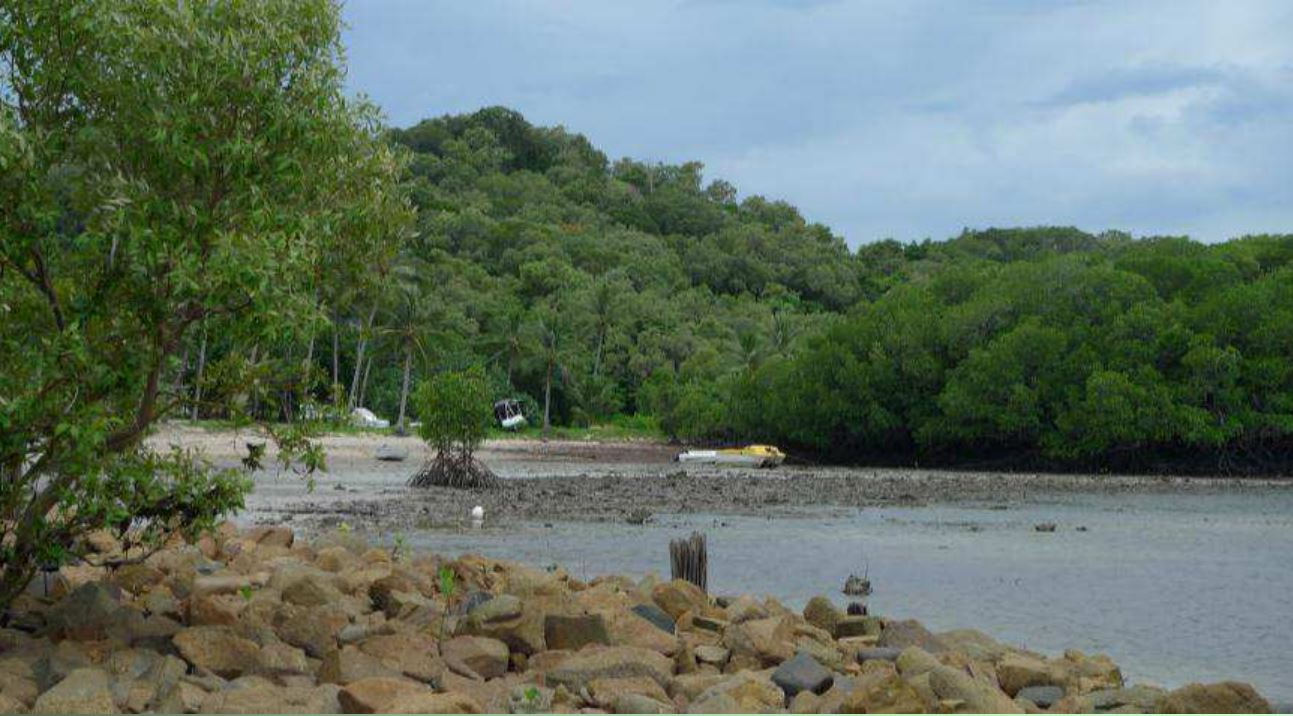
Portland Road, 2014

The town of Portland Road is named after the harbour of the same name. The harbour first appeared on an 1897 British Admiralty Chart.

In early 1934, Jack Gordon prospected the Iron Range locality from the Packers Creek field near Portland Roads. In June 1934, he followed a gold trail up a tributary of Gordon Creek, a branch of the Claudie River, and discovered what was later called the Iron Range Reef.

Within two years, the region was a hive of activity with 45 men working along an 8 kilometres (5.0 mi) strip. Although the original ore was shipped and railed to the Venus battery at Charters Towers for treatment, the Iron Range mill was in full operation by November 1936 after a Huntington mill was erected by Jack Gordon at the mine following great difficulties in transportation. This was soon followed by crushing machines on the Golden Gate and Scarlet Pimpernel leases. In 1938, the Iron Range mill operated for most of the year; a cyanide plant was installed and 29 men were employed.

On 11 November 1948, as part of a centenary commemoration, a monument to explorer Edmund Kennedy and his ill-fated expedition to explore Cape York Peninsula was erected at Portland Road near a spring where the expedition drew water in 1848.

On 11 April 2014, the former locality of Lockhart was split into two new localities: Iron Range and Lockhart River. The locality of Iron Range takes its name from the Iron Range National Park (now known as the Kutini-Payamu National Park).

== Demographics ==
In the 2016 census, Iron Range had a population of 14 people.

In the 2021 census, Iron Range had a population of 30 people.

== Heritage listings ==
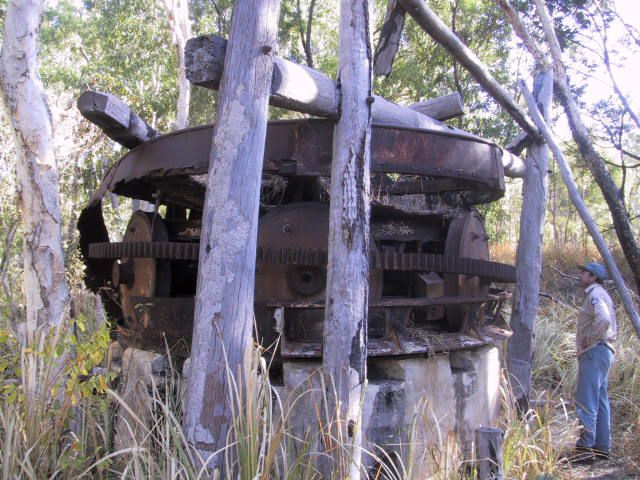
Gordon's Mine and Mill, 2002

Iron Range has a number of heritage-listed sites, including:

- Gordon's Mine and Mill (12.7153°S 143.2977°E)

== Education ==
There are no schools in Iron Range. The nearest government school is Lockhart State School in neighbouring Lockhart River to the south, which provides primary and secondary schooling.
