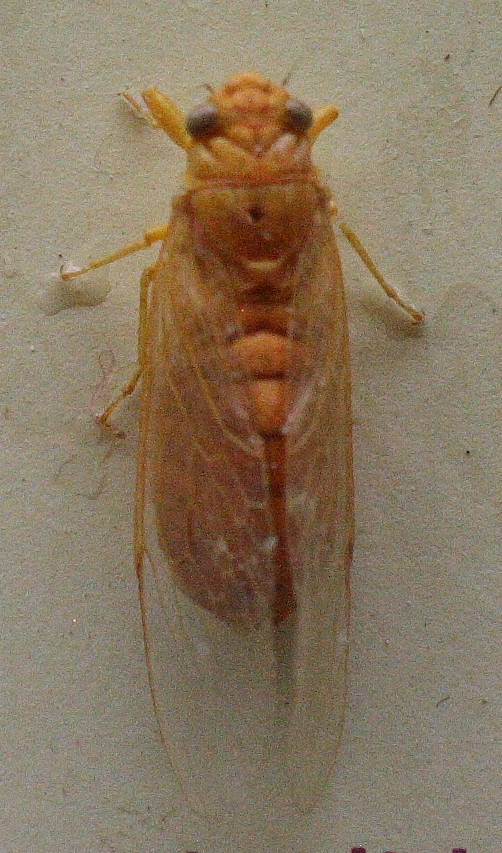
- Chlorocysta vitripennis

Scientific classification
- Kingdom: Animalia
- Phylum: Arthropoda
- Clade: Pancrustacea
- Class: Insecta
- Order: Hemiptera
- Suborder: Auchenorrhyncha
- Family: Cicadidae
- Subfamily: Cicadettinae
- Tribe: Chlorocystini; Distant, 1905

= Chlorocystini =

Tribe of true bugs

Chlorocystini is a tribe of cicadas in the family Cicadidae. There are at least 20 genera and 170 described species in Chlorocystini.

Members of Chlorocystini are found primarily in southeast Asia, Australasia, and the western Pacific. Isolated genera occur in Africa, South America, the Mascarene Islands, and Mauritius.

== Genera ==
These 25 genera belong to the tribe Chlorocystini:

- Aedeastria Boer, 1990^{c g}
- Akamba Distant, 1905^{c g}
- Baeturia Stål, 1866^{c g}
- Cephalalna Boulard, 2006^{c g}
- Chlorocysta Westwood, 1851^{c g}
- Conibosa Distant, 1905^{i c g}
- Cystopsaltria Goding & Froggatt, 1904^{c g}
- Cystosoma Westwood, 1842^{c g}
- Decebalus Distant, 1920^{c g}
- Dinarobia Mamet, 1957^{c g}
- Durangona Distant, 1911^{i c g}
- Euthemopsaltria Moulds, 2014^{c g}
- Fractuosella Boulard, 1979^{c g}
- Glaucopsaltria Goding & Froggatt, 1904^{c g}
- Guineapsaltria Boer, 1993^{c g}
- Gymnotympana Stål, 1861^{c g}
- Kumanga Distant, 1905^{c g}
- Mirabilopsaltria Boer, 1996^{c g}
- Muda Distant, 1897^{c g}
- Musoda Karsch, 1890^{c g}
- Owra Ashton, 1912^{c g}
- Papuapsaltria Boer, 1995^{c g}
- Scottotympana Boer, 1991^{c g}
- Thaumastopsaltria Kirkaldy, 1900^{c g}
- Venustria Goding & Froggatt, 1904^{c g}

Data sources: i = ITIS, c = Catalogue of Life, g = GBIF, b = Bugguide.net
