= Valid name (zoology) =

Sole correct taxonomic name

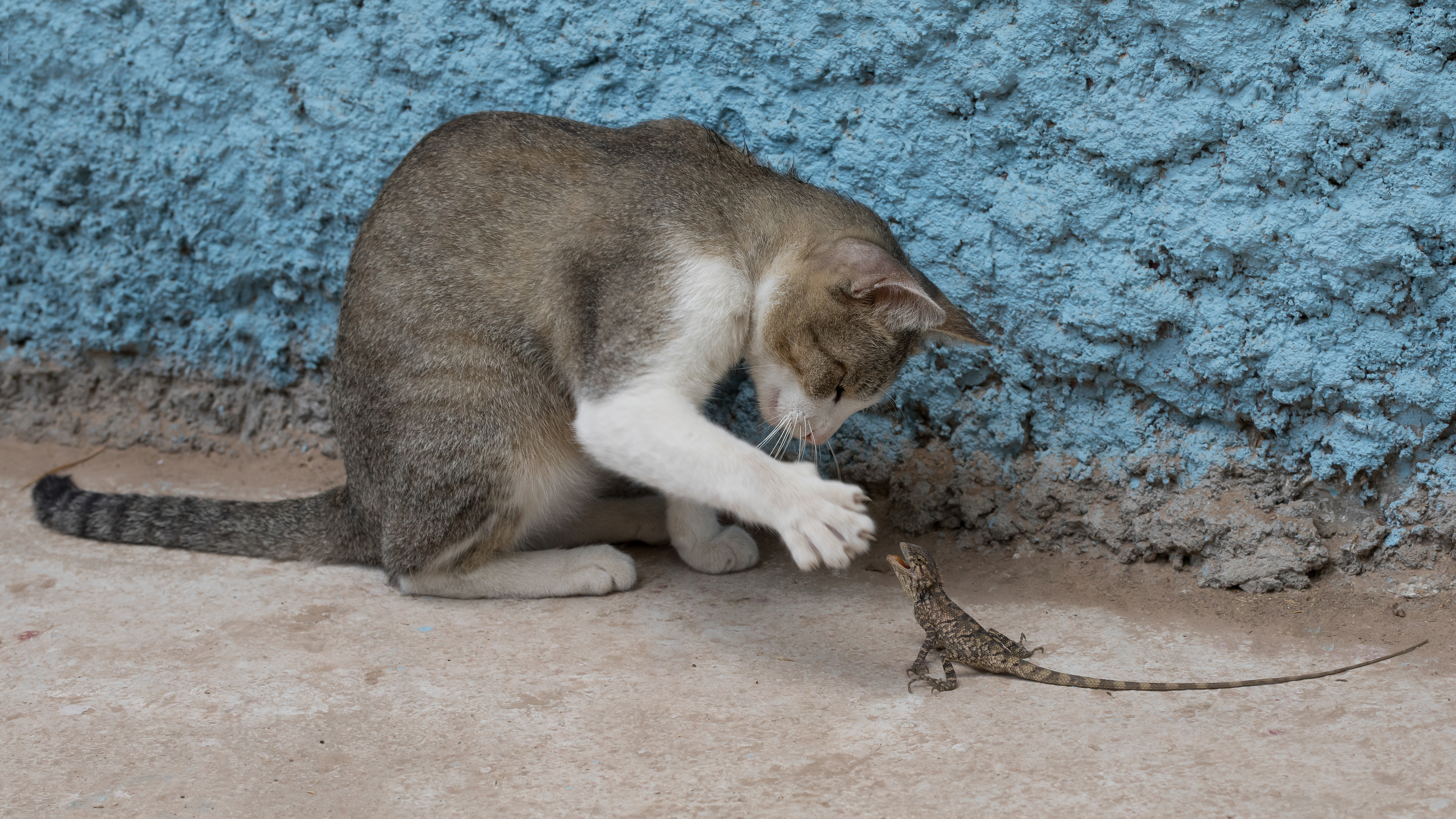
Felis catus (the domestic cat, in left) and Calotes versicolor (the Indian garden lizard, in right) are examples of valid names in zoology.

In zoological nomenclature, the valid name of a taxon is the correct scientific name for that taxon, given a particular circumscription. The valid name must be used for that taxon, regardless of any other name that may currently be used for that taxon, or may previously have been used. A name can only be valid (or invalid) when it is an available name under the International Code of Zoological Nomenclature (ICZN); if a name is unavailable, then it cannot be considered either valid or invalid.

In contrast, a name which is available but not the correct name for a taxon is known as an invalid name.

There are two categories of invalid names.

== Subjectively invalid names ==
Subjectively invalid names are names that have been rendered invalid by individual scientific judgement or opinion. Taxonomists may differ in their opinion, and names considered invalid by one researcher may be considered valid by another.

They include:

- Junior subjective synonyms – synonyms described from different types, which were previously described as separate taxa, but are now believed to be the same taxon. The junior name is treated as invalid only so long as the two names are considered to refer to the same taxon, which is a subjective opinion.
- Junior secondary homonyms – In this case, the taxa are separate species, originally described in separate genera, but with the same specific name; if they are later placed in the same genus, this results in the species names being homonyms, and generally only the senior homonym can be valid. The junior name is treated as invalid only so long as the two taxa are considered to belong to the same genus, which is a subjective opinion. However, if a name became a secondary homonym prior to 1961, and was replaced by a new name, the original name may be permanently invalid.
- Conditionally suppressed names – these are special cases where the International Commission on Zoological Nomenclature has ruled that a name can only be valid under certain conditions (e.g., when it is not considered a synonym of a name that is junior to it), but is otherwise to be suppressed. This is usually because the junior synonym (the later name) has had far wider and far longer common usage than the senior synonym (the older name).

== Objectively invalid names ==
Objectively invalid names are names that have been rendered invalid for indisputable reasons. These names are universally accepted as invalid, and are not merely a matter of individual opinion, as is the case with subjectively invalid names.

They include:

- Junior objective synonyms – synonyms described from the same types. The ICZN follows the Principle of Priority, in which the oldest available name for a taxon is generally the valid name.
- Junior homonyms in the family and genus group – names of families and genera which have identical spelling, but refer to different taxa. Only one of two (or more) such homonyms can be valid; junior family-rank names must typically either change their spelling or be replaced, while junior genus-rank homonyms must be replaced.
- Junior primary homonyms in a species group – cases resulting from two different organisms being originally described with identical names in the same genus. Typically, only the senior homonym can be valid, but if they are subsequently placed in different genera, they can sometimes both be valid.
- Junior secondary homonyms replaced prior to 1961 are permanently invalid if the replacement name is in use.
- Completely suppressed names – special cases where a name is completely suppressed by the International Commission on Zoological Nomenclature. It is treated as if it had never been published, and is never to be used, regardless of meeting criteria for availability.
- Partially suppressed names – special cases where a name is partially suppressed by the International Commission on Zoological Nomenclature. Unlike completely suppressed names, partially suppressed names are still acknowledged as having been published but are used only for the purpose of homonymy, not priority.

== Different rules for botany ==
Under the International Code of Nomenclature for algae, fungi, and plants, the term validly published name has a different meaning that corresponds to zoology's available name. The botanical equivalent of zoology's term "valid name" is correct name.

== See also ==
- International Code of Zoological Nomenclature
- Synonym (taxonomy)
