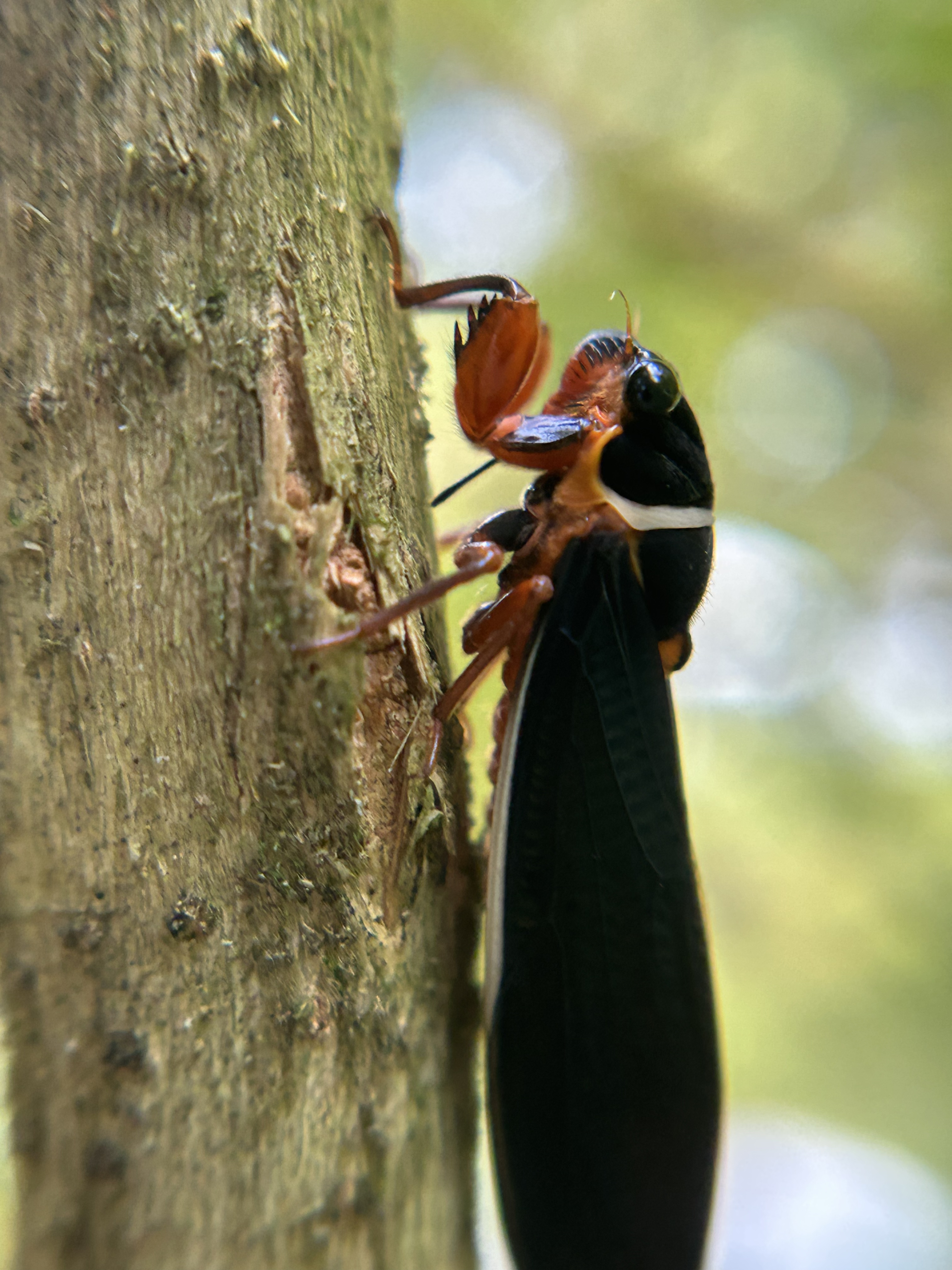

Scientific classification
- Kingdom: Animalia
- Phylum: Arthropoda
- Clade: Pancrustacea
- Class: Insecta
- Order: Hemiptera
- Suborder: Auchenorrhyncha
- Family: Cicadidae
- Subfamily: Cicadettinae
- Tribe: Cicadettini
- Genus: Scieroptera; Stål, 1866

= Scieroptera =

Genus of insects

Scieroptera is a genus of true cicada found throughout Asia.

== Description ==
Scieroptera cicadas generally resemble those of the Huechys genus, differing in that the face is not longitudinally furrowed. The head, including the eyes, is slightly broader than the base of the mesonotum. The front of the head is subconical. The pronotum is longer than the head, with lateral margins slightly convex and oblique. The mesonotum is no longer than the pronotum. The tympanal organs are completely exposed with no coverings. The undersides of the front femora are robustly spined. The tegmina is mostly opaque, with eight apical cells. The hindwings are transparent, with six apical cells.

== Species ==
- Scieroptera borneensis Schmidt, 1918
- Scieroptera crocea (Guérin-Méneville, 1838)
- Scieroptera delineata Distant, 1917
- Scieroptera distanti Schmidt, 1920
- Scieroptera flavipes Schmidt, 1918
- Scieroptera formosana Schmidt, 1918
- Scieroptera fulgens Schmidt, 1918
- Scieroptera fumigata (Stål, 1854)
- Scieroptera fuscolimbata Schmidt, 1918
- Scieroptera hyalinipennis Schmidt, 1912
- Scieroptera limpida Schmidt, 1918
- Scieroptera montana Schmidt, 1918
- Scieroptera niasana Schmidt, 1918
- Scieroptera orientalis Schmidt, 1918
- Scieroptera sanaoensis Schmidt, 1924
- Scieroptera sarasinorum Breddin, 1901
- Scieroptera splendidula (Fabricius, 1775)
- Scieroptera sumatrana Schmidt, 1918

== Etymology ==
The genus name Scieroptera is derived from the Greek words σκιερές (skierés), meaning darkened, and πτερόν (pterón), meaning wing.
