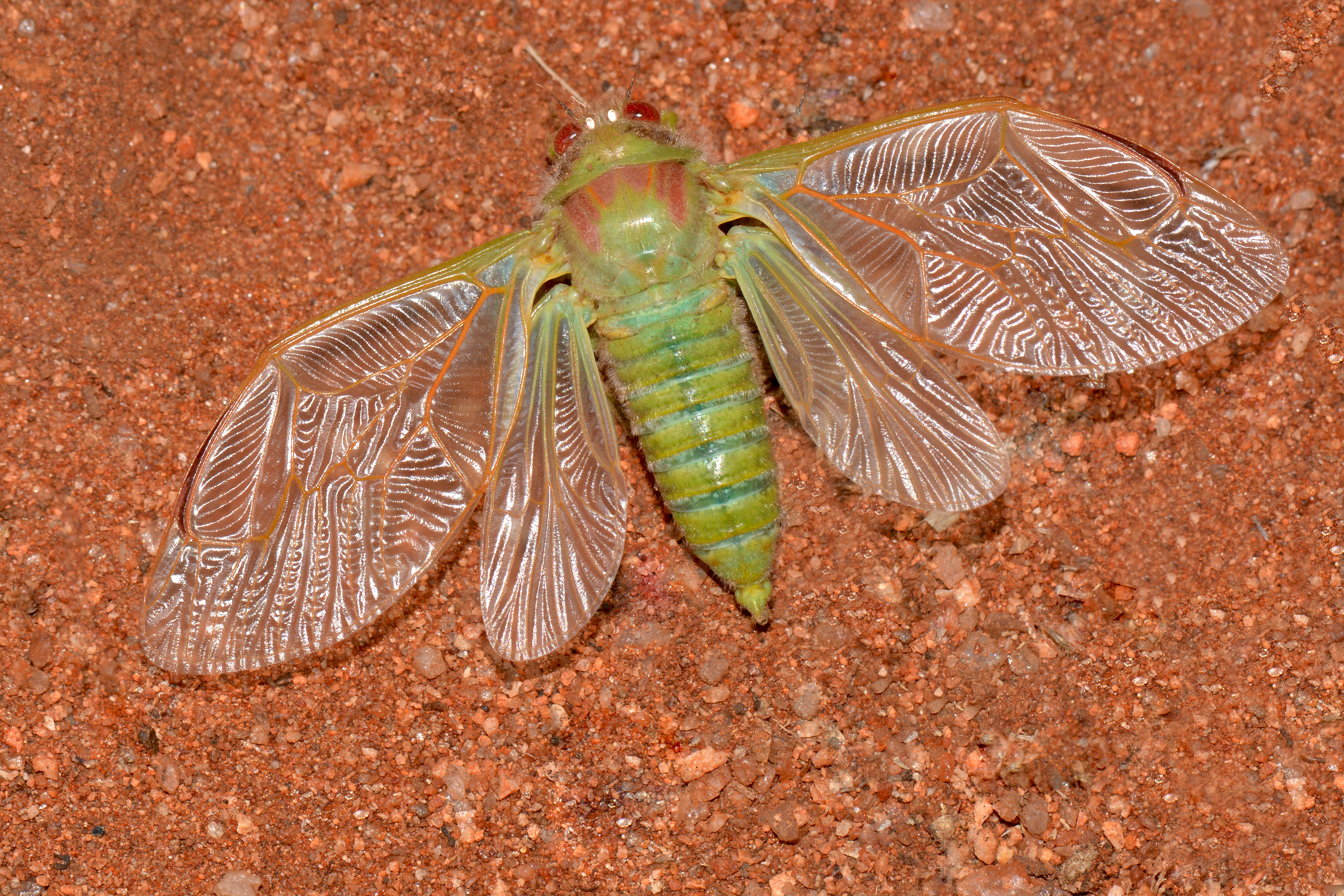

Scientific classification
- Kingdom: Animalia
- Phylum: Arthropoda
- Clade: Pancrustacea
- Class: Insecta
- Order: Hemiptera
- Suborder: Auchenorrhyncha
- Family: Cicadidae
- Genus: Froggattoides
- Species: F. pallidus

Binomial name
- Froggattoides pallidus (Ashton, 1912)

Synonyms
- Larrakeeya pallida Ashton, 1912

= Froggattoides pallidus =

Species of cicada

Froggattoides pallidus is a species of cicada, also known as the western bent-wing, in the true cicada family, Cicadettinae subfamily and Cicadettini tribe. It is endemic to Australia. It was described in 1912 by Australian entomologist Julian Howard Ashton.

== Description ==
The length of the forewing is 25–30 mm.

== Distribution and habitat ==
The species occurs in central inland Western Australia. Its associated habitat includes low Acacia shrubland.

== Behaviour ==
Adults have been heard between October and February, uttering loud “raspberry” calls, responded to with soft clicks, after dark.
