= Scieroptera crocea =

Scientific classification
- Kingdom: Animalia
- Phylum: Arthropoda
- Clade: Pancrustacea
- Class: Insecta
- Order: Hemiptera
- Suborder: Auchenorrhyncha
- Family: Cicadidae
- Genus: Scieroptera
- Species: S. crocea

Binomial name
- Scieroptera crocea Guérin-Méneville, 1838

Species of insect

Scieroptera crocea is a species of true cicada found in Southern Asia, including Sumatra, Indonesia, and Borneo.

== Description ==
Scieroptera crocea is mostly yellow in color, with reddish brown spots above its thorax. Its abdomen is saffron-red. Its feet are yellow, with black tibia and tarsi.

Scieroptera crocea is similar to Scieroptera splendidula in appearance. It differs in that its tegmina are semi-transparent and pale yellowish tan in color, with the venation being darker yellow. The face is black with yellowish tan margins.

Its body length, excluding the tegmina, is 15-20mm. Its tegmina span is between 40-57mm.

== Etymology ==
The species name crocea, means "yellow" in Latin.
