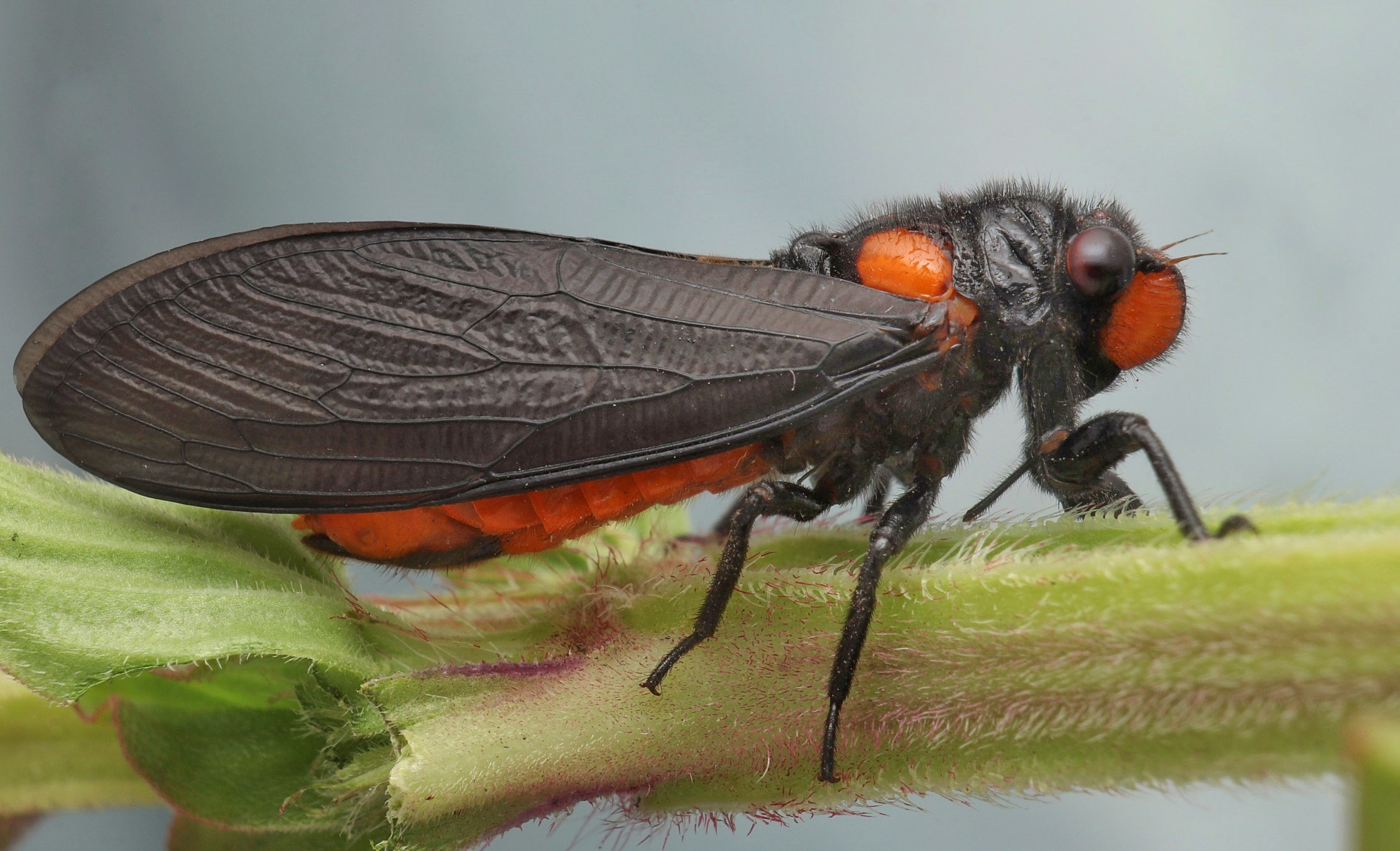

Scientific classification
- Kingdom: Animalia
- Phylum: Arthropoda
- Clade: Pancrustacea
- Class: Insecta
- Order: Hemiptera
- Suborder: Auchenorrhyncha
- Family: Cicadidae
- Genus: Huechys
- Species: H. phaenicura

Binomial name
- Huechys phaenicura (Germar, 1834)

Synonyms
- Cicada phaenicura Germar, 1834; Cicada phoenicura Burmeister, 1835; Huechys phoenicura Walker, F., 1850; Huechys (Huechys) phaenicura balabakensis Haupt, 1924; Huechys (Huechys) phaenicura palawanensis Haupt, 1924; Huechys (Huechys) phoenicura Haupt, 1924

= Huechys phaenicura =

Species of true bug

Huechys phaenicura is a species of Asian cicadas belonging to the family Cicadidae.

== Distribution ==
This species is present in India, Philippines, Malaysia, Indonesia (Java).
