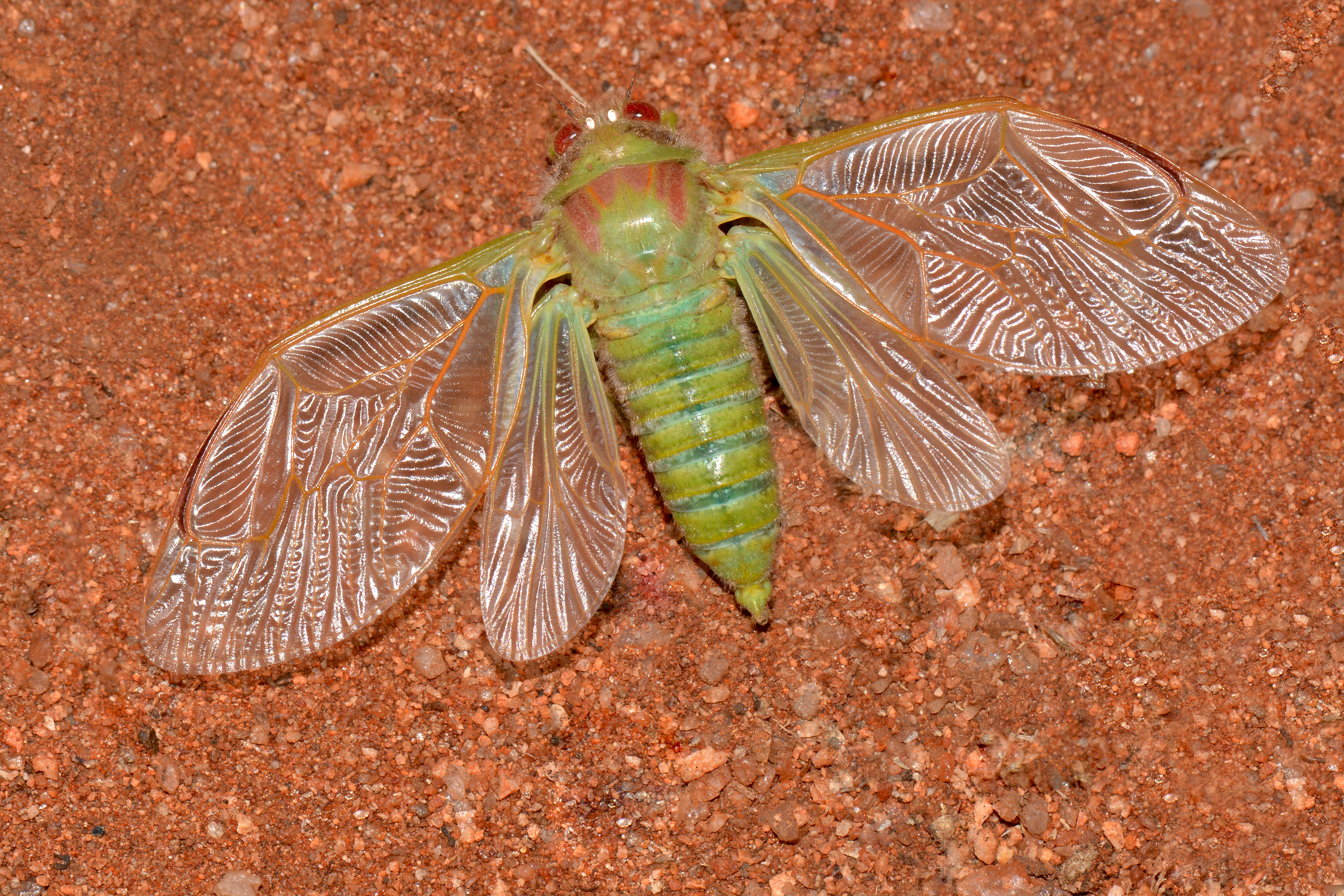
- Froggattoides pallidus

Scientific classification
- Kingdom: Animalia
- Phylum: Arthropoda
- Clade: Pancrustacea
- Class: Insecta
- Order: Hemiptera
- Suborder: Auchenorrhyncha
- Infraorder: Cicadomorpha
- Superfamily: Cicadoidea
- Family: Cicadidae
- Subfamily: Cicadettinae
- Genus: Froggattoides; Distant, 1910

= Froggattoides =

Genus of cicadas

Froggattoides is a genus of cicadas, also known as bent-wings, in the family Cicadidae, subfamily Cicadettinae and tribe Cicadettini. It is endemic to Australia. It was described in 1910 by English entomologist William Lucas Distant.

== Species ==
As of 2025 there were two described species in the genus:

- Froggattoides pallidus (Ashton, 1912) (Western Bent-wing)
- Froggattoides typicus Distant, 1910 (Eastern Bent-wing)
