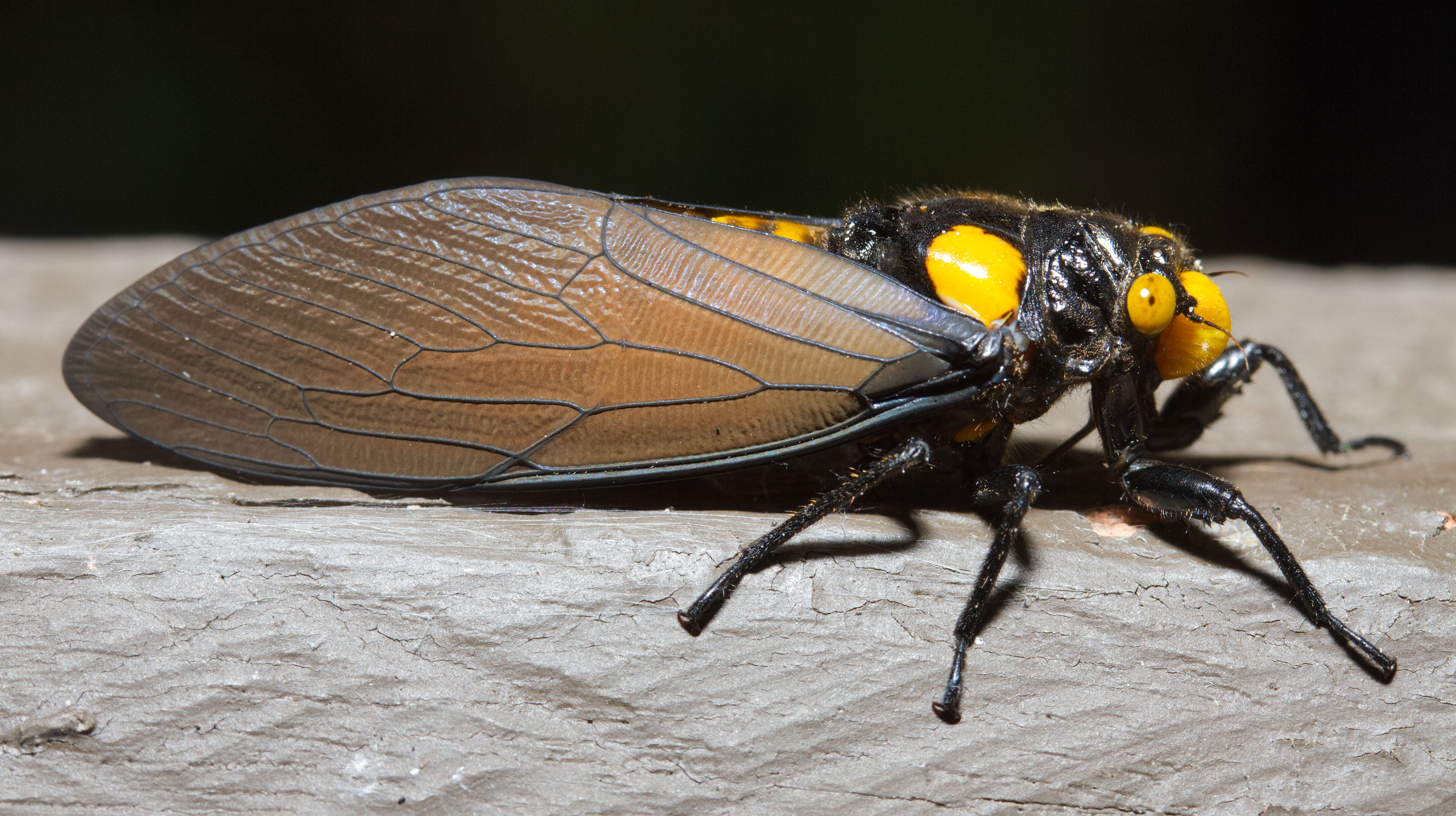
- Adult from Kinabalu Park
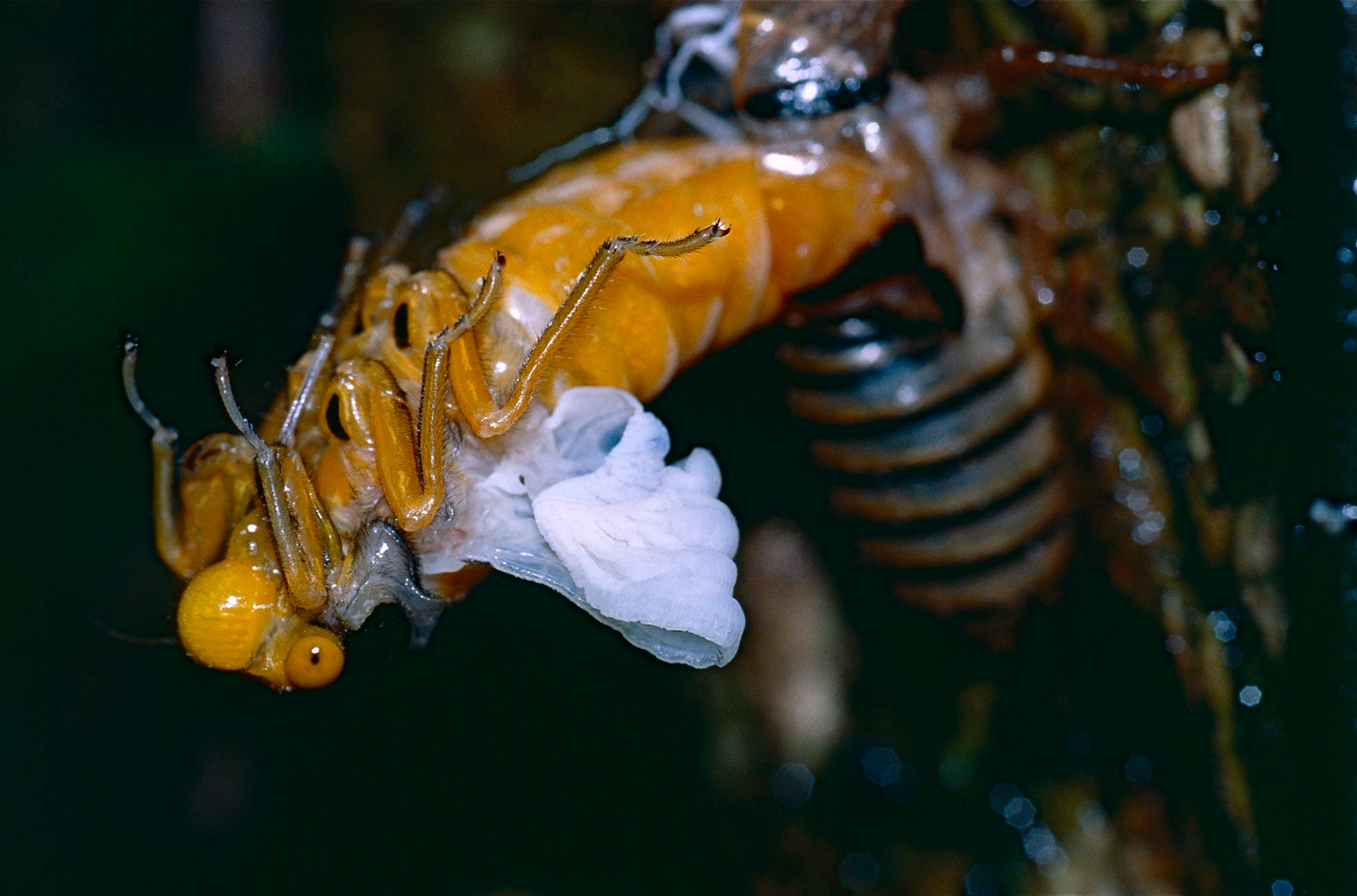
- Wings are temporarily white when first emerging from nymph exoskeleton

Scientific classification
- Kingdom: Animalia
- Phylum: Arthropoda
- Clade: Pancrustacea
- Class: Insecta
- Order: Hemiptera
- Suborder: Auchenorrhyncha
- Family: Cicadidae
- Genus: Huechys
- Species: H. fusca

Binomial name
- Huechys fusca (Distant, 1892)

Synonyms
- List: Huechys fusca nigra Lallemand, 1931; Huechys fusca fusca Distant, 1892

= Huechys fusca =

Species of true bug

Huechys fusca, commonly known as the black and golden cicada, is a species of Asian cicadas belonging to the tribe Cicadettini.

== Description & Ecology ==
Huechys fusca can reach a length of about 20 millimetres (0.79 in). They have a distinct greyish black body and wings, with yellow or black eyes, a yellow snout and yellow shoulder patches. The thorax is also an orange or yellow colour. When first molted, the wings are temporarily white and will fade to a black. Adults have been observed between June and November, with breeding behaviours such as calling and mating observed in October and November.

== Distribution ==
This species is native to Sumatra, the Malay Peninsula and Borneo. They have been found multiple times in Singapore, but are described as uncommon, where it is most often found in Bukit Timah Nature Reserve.
