= Scieroptera fumigata =

Scientific classification
- Kingdom: Animalia
- Phylum: Arthropoda
- Clade: Pancrustacea
- Class: Insecta
- Order: Hemiptera
- Suborder: Auchenorrhyncha
- Family: Cicadidae
- Genus: Scieroptera
- Species: S. fumigata

Binomial name
- Scieroptera fumigata Stål, 1854

Species of cicada endemic to India

Scieroptera fumigata is a species of true cicada endemic to India.

== Description ==
The body of Scieroptera fumigata is mostly black with two central pale yellow lines to the pronotum. The margins of the pronotum, mesonotum, abdomen, and femora are brownish red. The abdomen has black dorsal fascia. The tibiae and tarsi are dark brown. The tegmina are dark purplish brown with dull yellow venation and costal membranes. The wings are semi-transparent with yellow venation.

Its body length excluding tegmina is 12-19mm, and it has a tegmina span of 28–43 mm.

== Etymology ==
The species name fumigata means "smoky" in Latin.
