= Froggattoides typicus =

Scientific classification
- Kingdom: Animalia
- Phylum: Arthropoda
- Clade: Pancrustacea
- Class: Insecta
- Order: Hemiptera
- Suborder: Auchenorrhyncha
- Family: Cicadidae
- Genus: Froggattoides
- Species: F. typicus

Binomial name
- Froggattoides typicus Distant, 1910

Species of cicada

Froggattoides typicus is a species, or species complex, of cicada, also known as the eastern bent-wing, in the true cicada family, Cicadettinae subfamily and Cicadettini tribe. It is endemic to Australia. It was described in 1910 by English entomologist William Lucas Distant.

== Description ==
The length of the forewing is 25–30 mm.

== Distribution and habitat ==
The species complex occurs in Central Australia from the southern Northern Territory and northern South Australia eastwards into inland Queensland and north central New South Wales. Its associated habitat includes eucalypt woodland and sparse Acacia shrubland.

== Behaviour ==
Adults have been heard between September and April, uttering loud “raspberry” calls, responded to with soft clicks, during the night.
