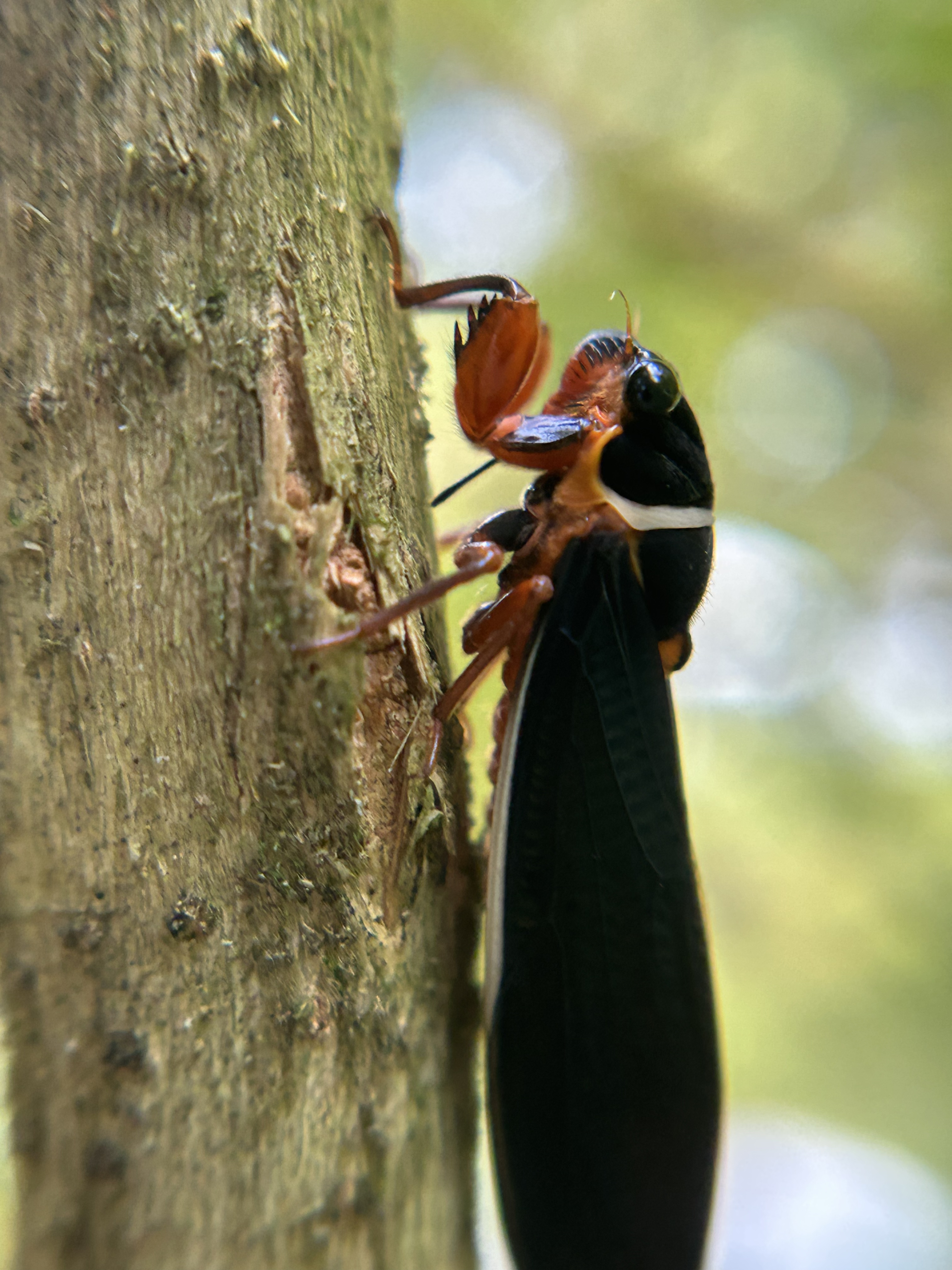

Scientific classification
- Kingdom: Animalia
- Phylum: Arthropoda
- Clade: Pancrustacea
- Class: Insecta
- Order: Hemiptera
- Suborder: Auchenorrhyncha
- Family: Cicadidae
- Genus: Scieroptera
- Species: S. formosana

Binomial name
- Scieroptera formosana Schmidt, 1918

= Scieroptera formosana =

Species of insect

Scieroptera formosana is a species of true cicada found throughout Asia, including in Taiwan, Japan, the Philippines, India, Myanmar, and Eastern China. In Taiwan, they are widely distributed between plains and low-altitude mountainous regions.

== Description ==
Scieroptera formosana has a slender red and black body with white markings. Its black head is wider than the base of the mesothorax, the middle of which is marked by a white stripe. The mesothorax also has a red X-shaped bulge. The red abdomen is longer than the head and thorax combined. Its legs are red with black markings in front of the coxae of each leg and above the coxae of the middle legs. The forewings are opaque black with a bluish-green metallic luster and a white vein running from the base of the wing to the nodus. The hindwings are mostly transparent, with a faint yellow-brown tinge. The species has black compound eyes and red ommatidium.

The male of the species lacks a dorsal plate and has a small, scaly ventral plate. Its telson is small, with a length of approximately 15-17mm, and its forewings are about 18-20mm long. The female has an enlarged telson with black markings on the upper edge of the telson and ovipositor sheath. The ovipositor extends slightly beyond the telson. Females of the species have a body length of about 19-20mm and forewings of about 20-22mm.

== Behavior ==
Adults emerge from February to August and are often found perched on Callicarpa formosana and Macaranga tanarius plants.
