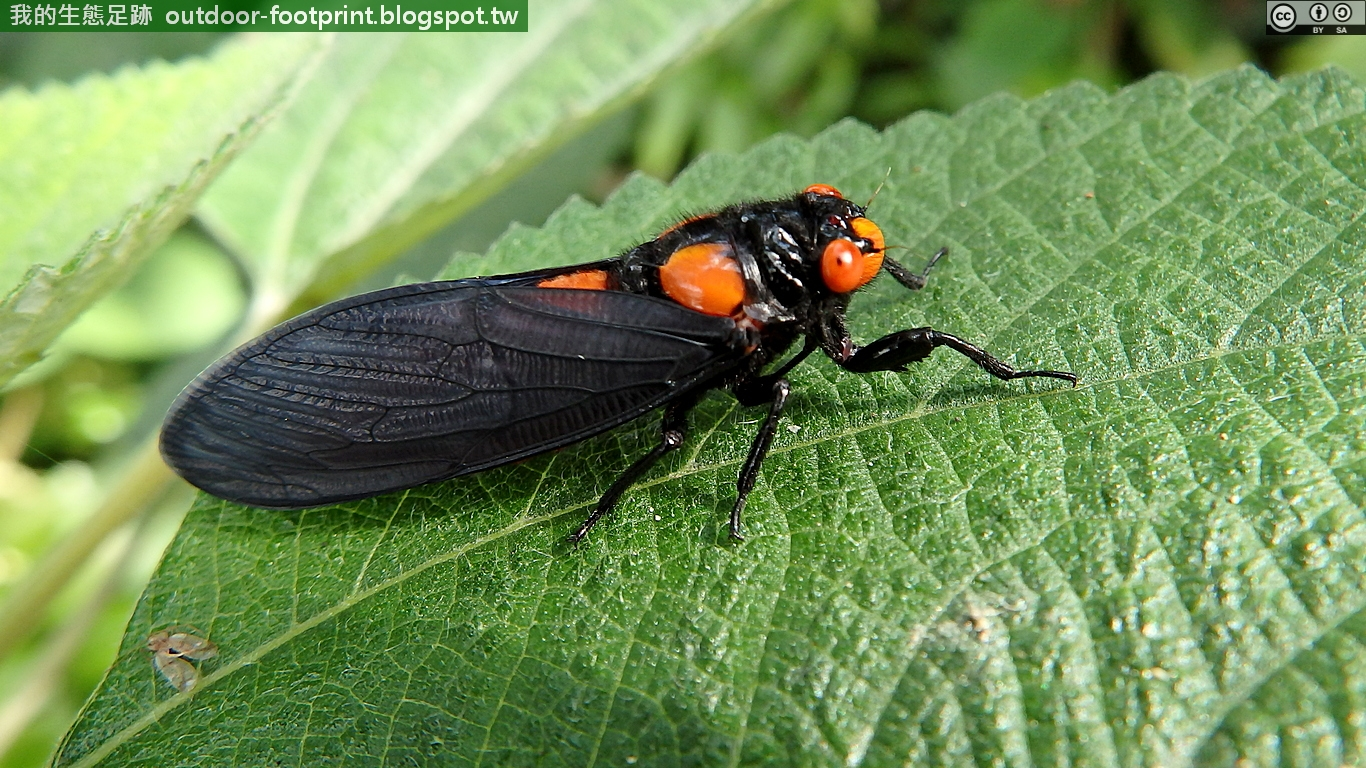
- Adult from Taipei, Taiwan
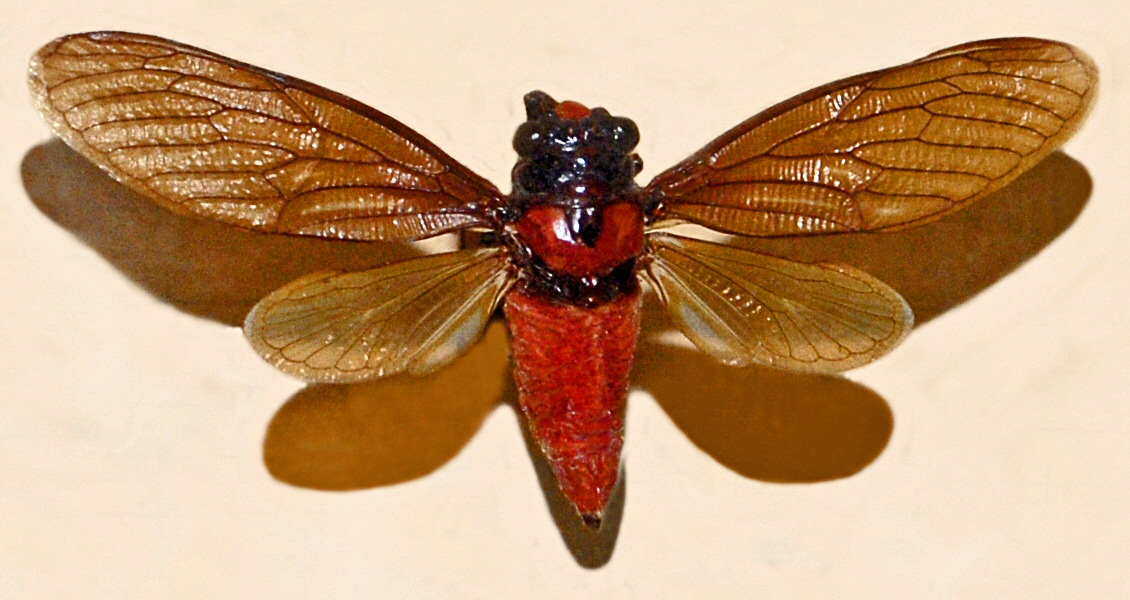
- Mounted specimen collected from Myanmar

Scientific classification
- Kingdom: Animalia
- Phylum: Arthropoda
- Class: Insecta
- Order: Hemiptera
- Suborder: Auchenorrhyncha
- Family: Cicadidae
- Genus: Huechys
- Species: H. sanguinea

Binomial name
- Huechys sanguinea (De Geer, 1773)

Synonyms
- List: Huechys vesicatoria Smith, F.P., 1871; Huechys philaemata; Cicada (Huechys) sanguinea; Huechys sanguinea philaemata; Tettigonia sanguinolenta Fabricius, 1775; Huechys (Huechys) sanguinea philaemata; Huechys quadrispinosa; Huechyys aurantiaca Distant, 1917; Huechys (Huechys) sanguinea aurantiaca Metcalf, 1963; Cicada incarnata philaematis Guerin-Meneville, 1838; Scieroptera sanguinea; Cicada sanguinolenta; Huechys sanginea Ishihara, 1965; Huechys (Huechys) quadrispinosa Haupt, 1924; Huechys (Huechys) sanguinea; Peuchys vesicatoria; Cicada philaemata; Tettigonia philaemata Fabricius, 1803; Cicada philoemata Blanchard, 1840; Huechys sanguinea; Tettigonia sangvinolenta Billberg, 1820; Huechys sanguinea aurantiaca Kato, 1931; Huechys sanguinea sanguinea; Huechys (Huechys) sanguinea albifascia; Huechys sanquinea Mitra & Muraleedharan, 1976; Huechys philaemata albifascia; Huechys sanquiena Muller, 1949; Huechys vesicatoria Smith, F.P., 1872; Huechys sanguinea var. albifascia Kato, 1927; Huechys sanguinolenta; Cicada sanguinea De Geer, 1773

= Huechys sanguinea =

Species of true bug

Huechys sanguinea, commonly known as the black and scarlet cicada, is a species of Asian cicadas belonging to the tribe Cicadettini.

== Subspecies ==
Four subspecies are recognized:

- H. s. hainanensis
- H. s. philaemata
- H. s. suffusa
- H. s. wuchangensis

== Description ==
Huechys sanguinea can reach a length of about 20 millimetres (0.79 in). It is a small strikingly coloured cicada. The basic body color is deep scarlet with smoky-grey wings, but proboscis and limbs are deep black. These cicadas usually emerge synchronously in April. The specific name is from Latin sanguis, blood.

== Distribution ==
This species is native to South- and Southeast Asia, specifically India and Myanmar, southern China (including Hainan Island), Taiwan, Vietnam, Thailand, the Malay Peninsula, Borneo, Singapore and down into Sumatra and Timor.
