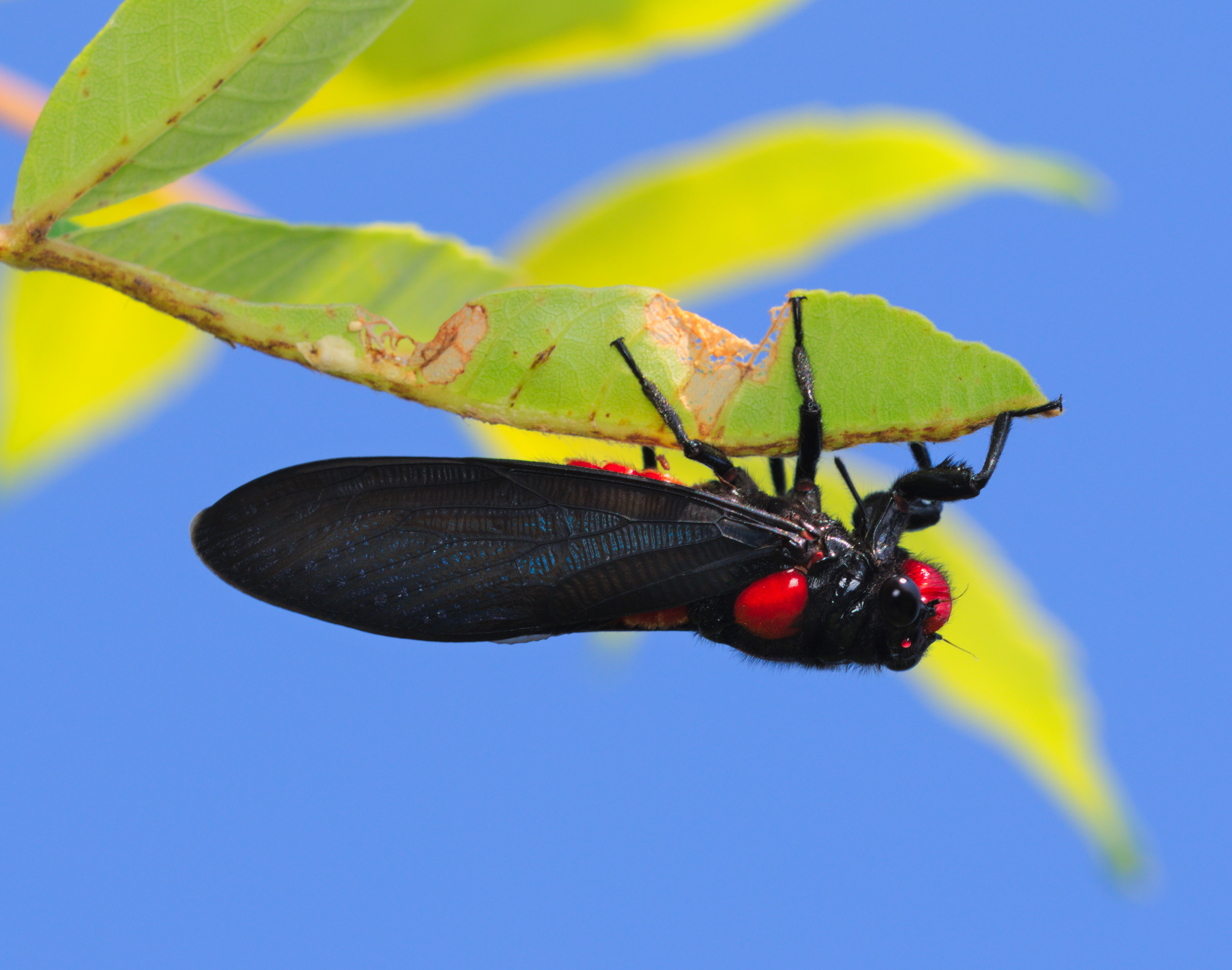
- Huechys sanguinea

Scientific classification
- Domain: Eukaryota
- Kingdom: Animalia
- Phylum: Arthropoda
- Class: Insecta
- Order: Hemiptera
- Suborder: Auchenorrhyncha
- Family: Cicadidae
- Subfamily: Cicadettinae
- Tribe: Cicadettini
- Genus: Huechys; Amyot & Serville, 1843

= Huechys =

Genus of true bugs

Huechys is a genus of cicadas in the tribe Cicadettini, with species recorded from Asia and the Americas.

== Taxonomy ==
The genus name is derived from the Chinese words for 'blood cicada'. Although it has been claimed that the Chinese name refers to Huechys, Chinese entomologist Gaines Liu notes that the name Chu ki refers to Lycorma delicatula. He noted that the name for the black and red cicada was Er according to the Fang Yen written by Yang Hsiung (53 B.C. - A.D. 18).

=== Species ===
The World Auchenorrhyncha Database includes:

1. Huechys aenea Distant, 1913
2. Huechys beata Chou, Lei, Li, Lu & Yao, 1997
3. Huechys celebensis Distant, 1888
4. Huechys chantrainei Boulard, 2013
5. Huechys chryselectra Distant, 1888
6. Huechys curvata Haupt, 1924
7. Huechys dohertyi Distant, 1892
8. Huechys eos Breddin, 1901
9. Huechys facialis Walker, 1857
10. Huechys fretensis Haupt, 1924
11. Huechys funebris Lee, 2011
12. Huechys fusca Distant, 1892
13. Huechys haematica Distant, 1888
14. Huechys insularis Haupt, 1924
15. Huechys lutulenta Distant, 1892
16. Huechys nigripennis Moulton, 1923
17. Huechys parvula Haupt, 1924
18. Huechys phaenicura (Germar, 1834)
19. Huechys pingenda Distant, 1888
20. Huechys sanguinea (De Geer, 1773) - type species (as Cicada sanguinea De Geer)
21. Huechys testacea (Fabricius, 1787)
22. Huechys thoracica Distant, 1879
23. Huechys tonkinensis Distant, 1917
24. Huechys vidua (White, 1846)
