= Scieroptera splendidula =

Scientific classification
- Kingdom: Animalia
- Phylum: Arthropoda
- Clade: Pancrustacea
- Class: Insecta
- Order: Hemiptera
- Suborder: Auchenorrhyncha
- Family: Cicadidae
- Genus: Scieroptera
- Species: S. splendidula

Binomial name
- Scieroptera splendidula Fabricius, 1775

Species of insect

Scieroptera splendidula is a species of true cicada found throughout Asia, including in Indonesia, China, India, and Borneo.

== Description ==
The coloration of Scieroptera splendidula varies widely between individuals. Generally, the body is mostly black, with yellowish tan markings on the margins of the pronotum, mesonotum, and sternum, as well as the central fascia. Its cruciform elevation is also yellowish-tan. Its tegmina are near-black and its hindwings are transparent and faintly yellow-tinged. Some individuals may have purplish markings on the pronotum and head as well, while others may have ochraceous markings on the head and face. Above the thorax, it has four large black-ish rounded spots. Its anterior tibiae and posterior femora are red, while the rest of its femora are black. Its abdomen is sanguineous in color.

Excluding the tegmina, the body length of the species ranges from 12-20mm and the tegmina span is between 32-53mm.

== Etymology ==
The species name "splendidula" is Latin for "shiny" or "glittering".
