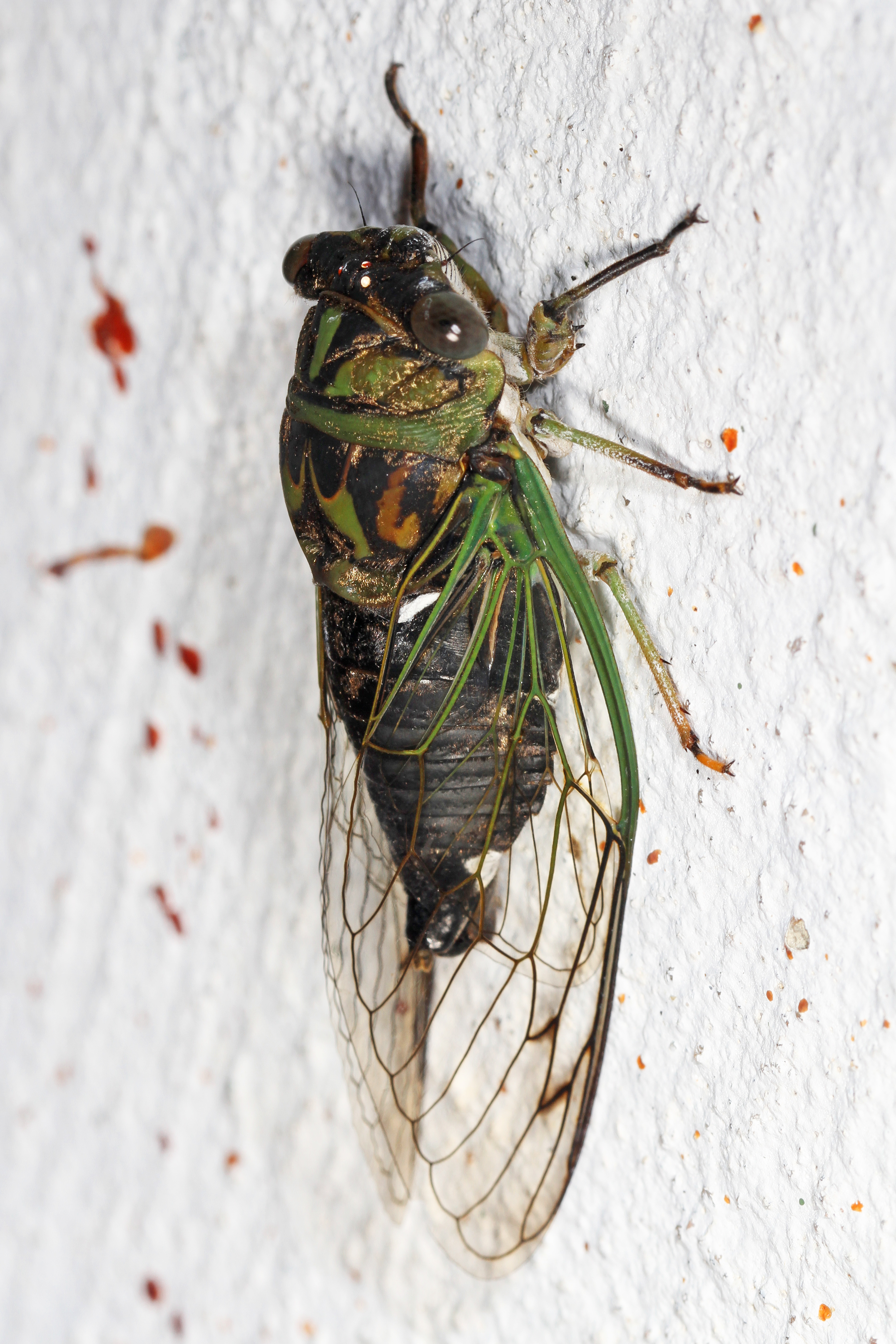
- Linne's cicada, Neotibicen linnei

Scientific classification
- Kingdom: Animalia
- Phylum: Arthropoda
- Clade: Pancrustacea
- Class: Insecta
- Order: Hemiptera
- Suborder: Auchenorrhyncha
- Infraorder: Cicadomorpha
- Superfamily: Cicadoidea; Latreille, 1802

Families
- Tettigarctidae; Cicadidae

Audio
- Calling song of Magicicada cassini

= Cicada =

Cicada Temporal range: Late Triassic – recent

Superfamily of insects

The cicadas (/sɪˈkɑːdəz, -ˈkeɪ-/) are a superfamily, the Cicadoidea, of insects in the order Hemiptera (true bugs). They are in the suborder Auchenorrhyncha, (Note: The Auchenorrhyncha were formerly part of the obsolete "Homoptera") along with smaller jumping bugs such as leafhoppers and froghoppers. The superfamily is divided into two families, the Tettigarctidae, with two species in Australia, and the Cicadidae, with more than 3,000 species described from around the world; many species remain undescribed. Nearly all cicada species are annual cicadas with the exception of the few North American periodical cicada species, genus Magicicada, which in a given region emerge en masse every 13 or 17 years.

Cicadas have prominent eyes set wide apart, short antennae, and membranous front wings. They have an exceptionally loud song, produced in most species by the rapid buckling and unbuckling of drum-like tymbals. The earliest known fossil Cicadomorpha appeared in the Upper Permian period; extant species occur all around the world in temperate to tropical climates. They typically live in trees, feeding on watery sap from xylem tissue, and laying their eggs in a slit in the bark. Most cicadas are cryptic. The vast majority of species are active during the day as adults, with some calling at dawn or dusk. Only a rare few species are known to be nocturnal.

One exclusively North American genus, Magicicada (the periodical cicadas), which spend most of their lives as underground nymphs, emerge in predictable intervals of 13 or 17 years, depending on the species and the location. The unusual timing and synchronization of their emergence may reduce cicada losses to predation by making them less reliable prey and by overwhelming predators with sheer numbers before significant losses occur.

The annual cicadas are species that emerge every year. Though these cicadas' life cycles can vary from one to nine or more years as underground nymphs, their emergence above ground as adults is not synchronized, so some members of each species appear every year.

Cicadas have been featured in literature since the time of Homer's Iliad and as motifs in art from the Chinese Shang dynasty. They have also been used in myth and folklore as symbols of carefree living and immortality. The cicada is also mentioned in Hesiod's Shield (ll. 393–394), in which it is said to sing when millet first ripens. Cicadas are eaten by humans in various parts of the world, including China, Myanmar, Malaysia, central Africa and parts of Mexico.

== Etymology ==
The name is directly from the onomatopoeic Latin cicada. (Note: See katydid for more etymology.)

Cicada is a 1939 film produced and distributed by the United States Department of Agriculture Motion Picture Service.

== Taxonomy and diversity ==
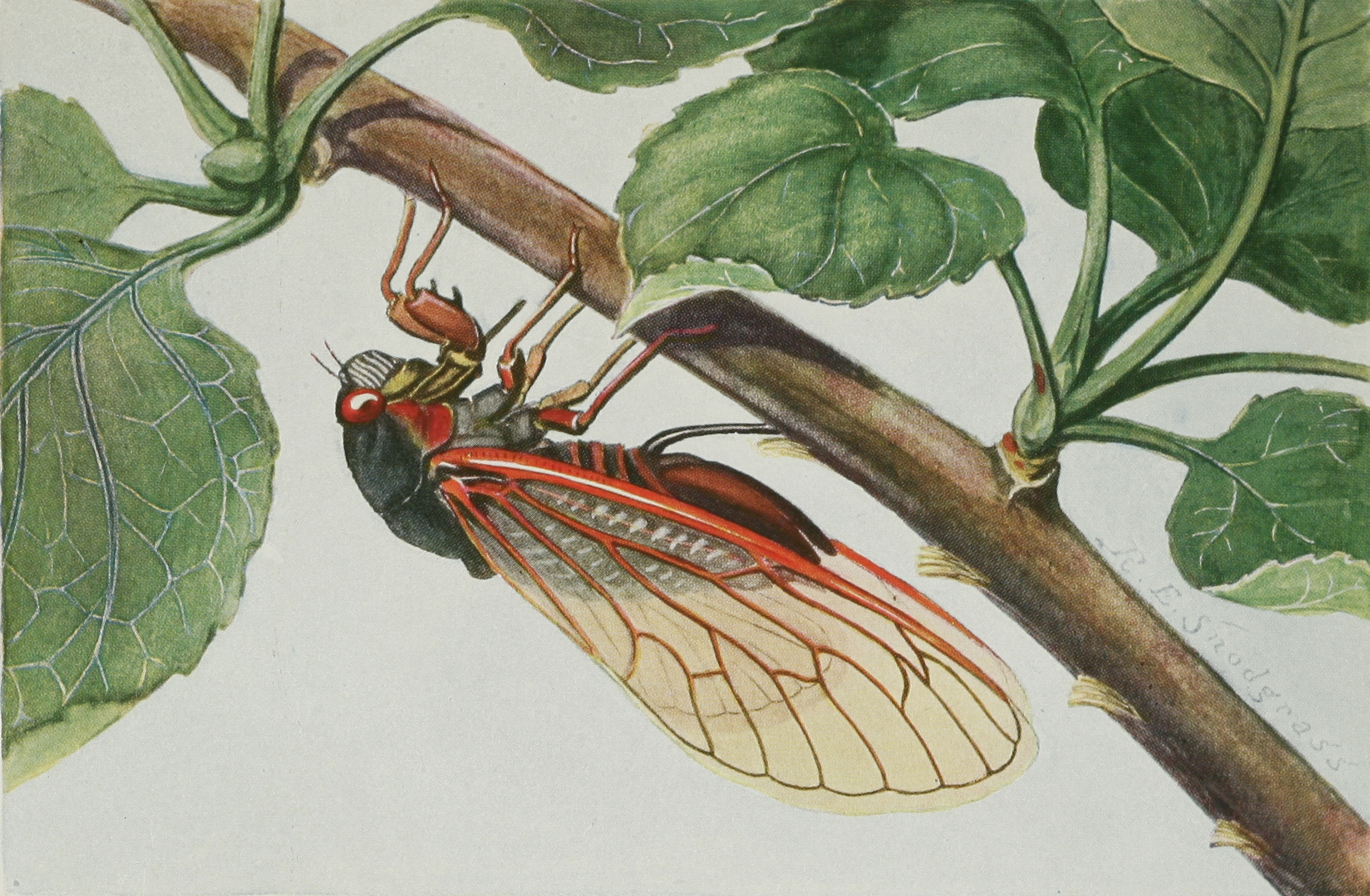
A 17-year cicada, Magicicada, Robert Evans Snodgrass, 1930

The superfamily Cicadoidea is a sister of the Cercopoidea (the froghoppers). Cicadas are arranged into two families: the Tettigarctidae and Cicadidae. The two extant species of the Tettigarctidae include one in southern Australia and the other in Tasmania. The family Cicadidae is subdivided into the subfamilies Cicadettinae, Cicadinae, Derotettiginae, Tibicininae (or Tettigadinae), and Tettigomyiinae, and they are found on all continents except Antarctica. Some previous works also included a family-level taxon called the Tibiceninae. The largest species is the Malaysian emperor cicada Megapomponia imperatoria; its wingspan is up to about 20 cm (8 in). Cicadas are also notable for the great length of time some species take to mature.

At least 3,000 cicada species are distributed worldwide, in essentially any habitat that has deciduous trees, with the majority being in the tropics. Most genera are restricted to a single biogeographical region, and many species have a very limited range. This high degree of endemism has been used to study the biogeography of complex island groups such as in Indonesia and Asia. There are several hundred described species in Australia and New Zealand, (Note: A further 300 collected Australian species remain to be described.) around 150 in South Africa, over 170 in America north of Mexico, at least 800 in Latin America, and over 200 in Southeast Asia and the Western Pacific.

About 100 species occur in the Palaearctic. A few species are found in southern Europe, and a single species was known from England, the New Forest cicada, Cicadetta montana, which also occurs in continental Europe. Many species await formal description and many well-known species are yet to be studied carefully using modern acoustic analysis tools that allow their songs to be characterized.

- - Cicadidae
    - - - - Cicadinae
          - Cicadettinae
      - Tettigomyiinae
    - Tibicininae
  - Tettigarctidae

A phylogenetic treatment suggested by a 2018 study

Many of the North American species are the annual or jarfly or dog-day cicadas, members of the Neotibicen, Megatibicen, or Hadoa genera, so named because they emerge in late July and August. The best-known North American genus, however, may be Magicicada. These periodical cicadas have an extremely long life cycle of 13 or 17 years, with adults suddenly and briefly emerging in large numbers.

Australian cicadas are found on tropical islands and cold coastal beaches around Tasmania, in tropical wetlands, high and low deserts, alpine areas of New South Wales and Victoria, large cities including Sydney, Melbourne, and Brisbane, and Tasmanian highlands and snowfields. Many of them have common names such as cherry nose, brown baker, red eye, greengrocer, yellow Monday, whisky drinker, double drummer, and black prince. The Australian greengrocer, Cyclochila australasiae, is among the loudest insects in the world.

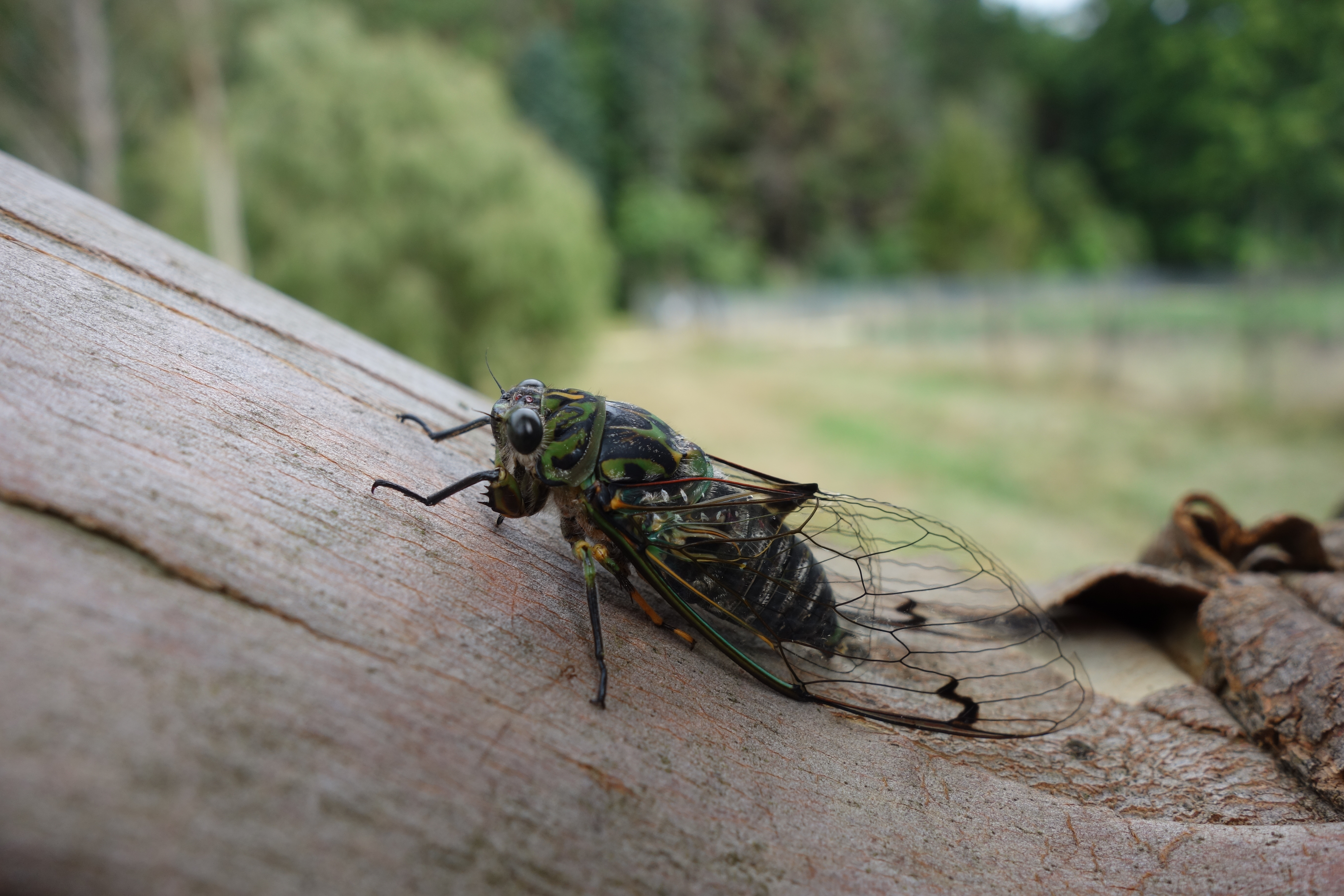
A chorus cicada, a species endemic to New Zealand

Cicadas in Japan

More than 40 species from five genera populate New Zealand, ranging from sea level to mountain tops, and all are endemic to New Zealand and its surrounding islands (Kermadec Islands, Chatham Islands). One species is found on Norfolk Island, which technically is part of Australia. The closest relatives of the NZ cicadas live in New Caledonia and Australia.

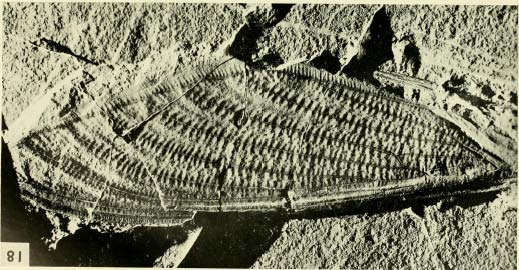
Mesozoic fossil fore wing of Mesogereon superbum, Australia

=== Palaeontology ===
Fossil Cicadomorpha first appeared in the Late Triassic. The superfamily Palaeontinoidea contains three families. The Upper Permian Dunstaniidae are found in Australia and South Africa, and also in younger rocks from China. The Upper Triassic Mesogereonidae are found in Australia and South Africa. This group, though, is currently thought to be more distantly related to Cicadomorpha than previously thought.

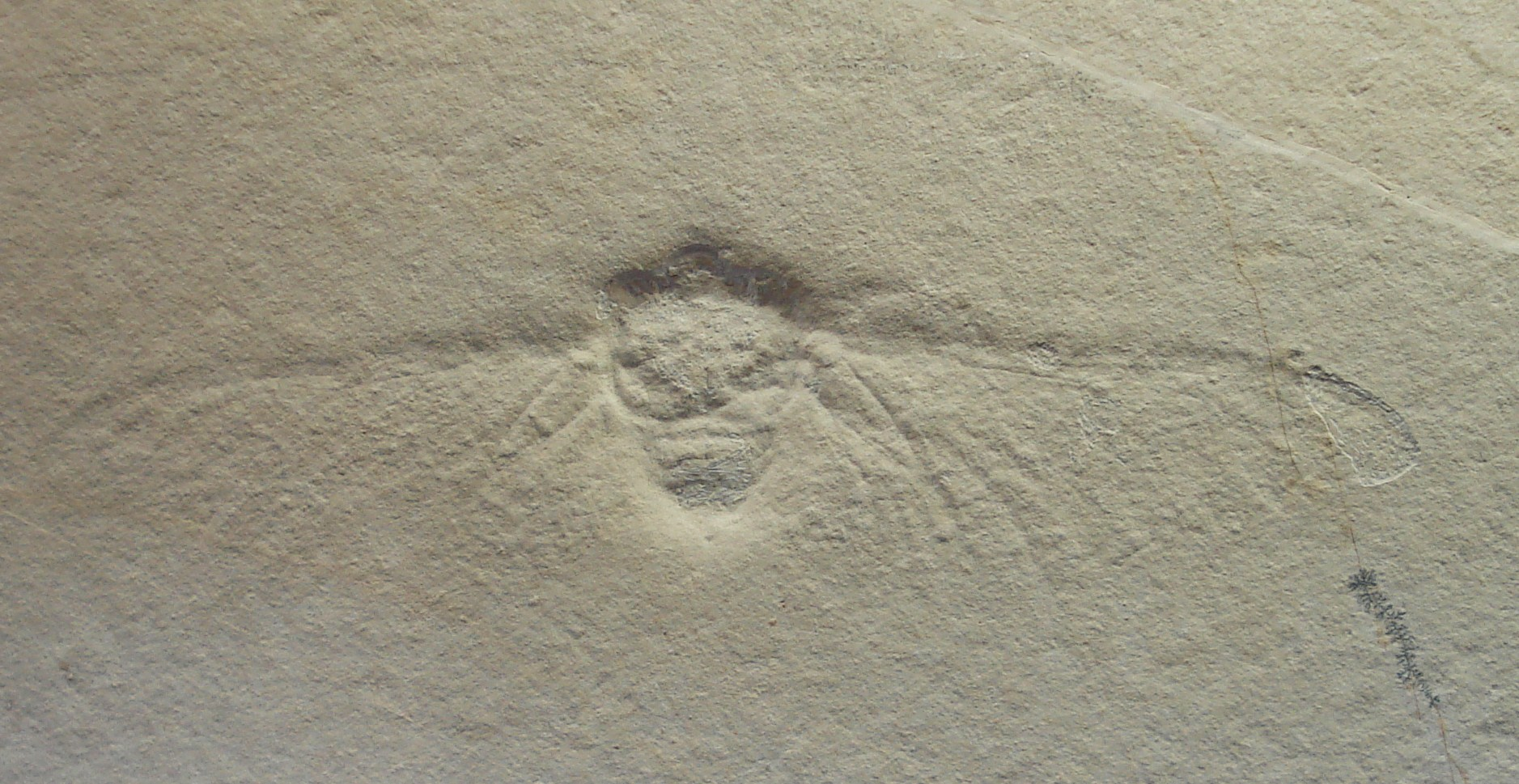
The giant cicada Prolystra lithographica from Germany, Jurassic, about 145–150 million years ago

The Palaeontinidae or "giant cicadas" (though only distantly related to true cicadas) come from the Jurassic and Lower Cretaceous of Eurasia and South America. The first of these was a fore wing discovered in the Taynton Limestone Formation of Oxfordshire, England; it was initially described as a butterfly in 1873, before being recognised as a cicada-like form and renamed Palaeontina oolitica.

Tettigarctidae and Cicadidae had diverged from each other prior to or during the Jurassic, as evidenced by fossils related to both lineages present by the Middle Jurassic (~165 million years ago). The morphology of well preserved fossils of early relatives of Cicadidae from the mid Cretaceous Burmese amber of Myanmar suggests that unlike many modern cicadids, they were either silent or only made quiet sounds. Most fossil Cicadidae are known from the Cenozoic, and the oldest unambiguously identified modern cicadid is Davispia bearcreekensis (subfamily Tibicininae) from the Paleocene, around 56–59 million years ago.

== Biology ==
=== Description ===
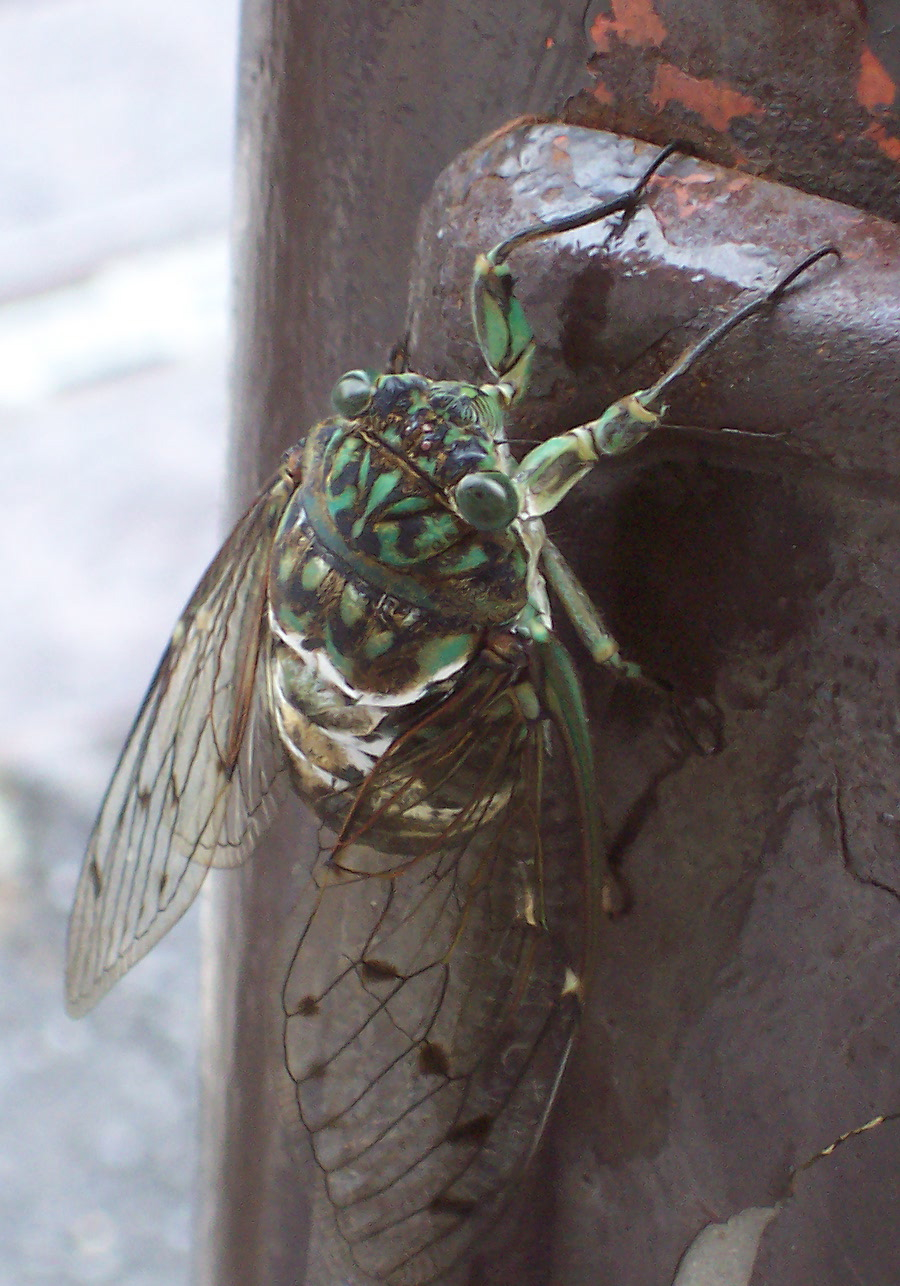
The onomatopoeically-named Japanese min-min-zemi (ミンミンゼミ, minminzemi), Hyalessa maculaticollis, an annual cicada

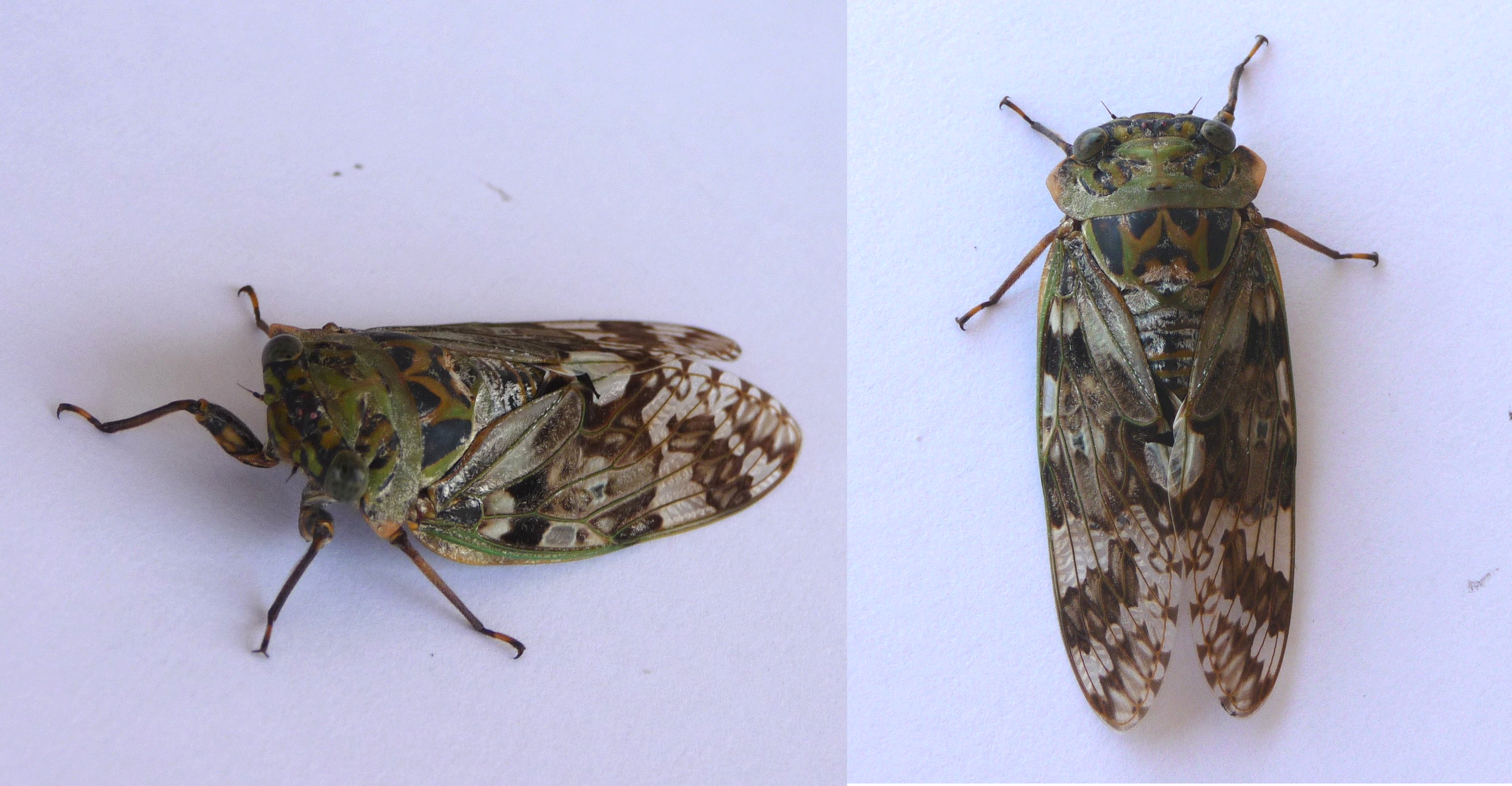
A Japanese nii-nii-zemi (ニイニイゼミ, nīnīzemi), Platypleura kaempferi, an annual cicada

Cicadas are large insects made conspicuous by the courtship calls of the males. They are characterized by having three joints in their tarsi, and having small antennae with conical bases and three to six segments, including a seta at the tip. The Auchenorrhyncha differ from other hemipterans by having a rostrum that arises from the posteroventral part of the head, complex sound-producing membranes, and a mechanism for linking the wings that involves a down-rolled edging on the rear of the fore wing and an upwardly protruding flap on the hind wing.

Cicadas are feeble jumpers, and nymphs lack the ability to jump altogether. Another defining characteristic is the adaptations of the fore limbs of nymphs for underground life. The relict family Tettigarctidae differs from the Cicadidae in having the prothorax extending as far as the scutellum, and by lacking the tympanal apparatus.

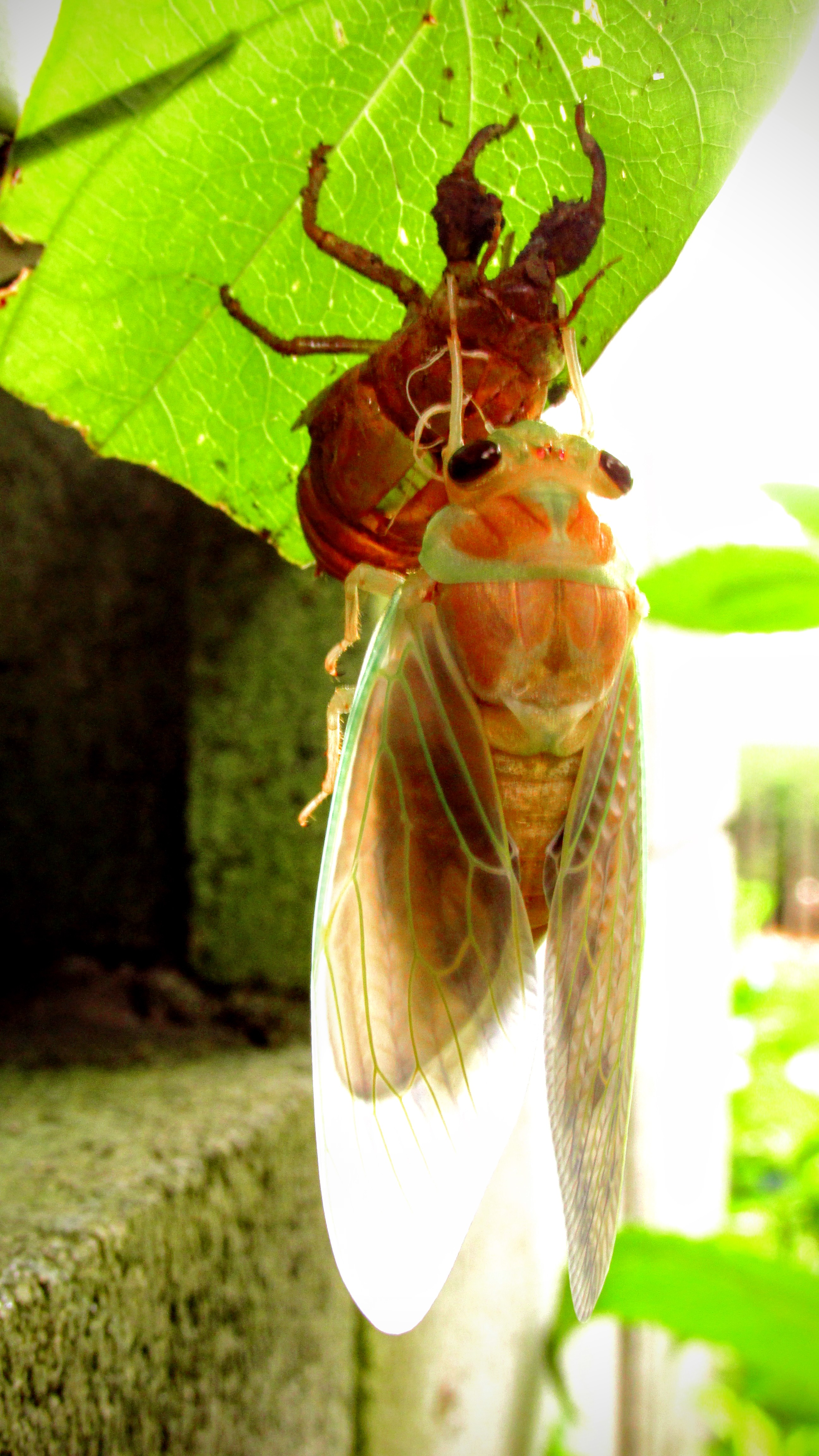
A black cicada just after molting (Midwest Saitama Prefecture, Japan)

The adult insect, known as an imago, is 2 to 5 cm (1 to 2 in) in total length in most species. The largest, the empress cicada (Megapomponia imperatoria), has a head-body length around 7 cm (2.8 in), and its wingspan is 18–20 cm (7–8 in). Cicadas have prominent compound eyes set wide apart on the sides of the head. The short antennae protrude between the eyes or in front of them. They also have three small ocelli located on the top of the head in a triangle between the two large eyes; this distinguishes cicadas from other members of the Hemiptera. The mouthparts form a long, sharp rostrum that they insert into the plant to feed. The postclypeus is a large, nose-like structure that lies between the eyes and makes up most of the front of the head; it contains the pumping musculature.

The thorax has three segments and houses the powerful wing muscles. They have two pairs of membranous wings that may be hyaline, cloudy, or pigmented. The wing venation varies between species and may help in identification. The middle thoracic segment has an operculum on the underside, which may extend posteriorly and obscure parts of the abdomen. The abdomen is segmented, with the hindermost segments housing the reproductive organs, and terminates in females with a large, saw-edged ovipositor. In males, the abdomen is largely hollow and used as a resonating chamber.

The surface of the fore wing is superhydrophobic; it is covered with minute, waxy cones, blunt spikes that create a water-repellent film. Rain rolls across the surface, removing dirt in the process. In the absence of rain, dew condenses on the wings. When the droplets coalesce, the cicada leaps several millimetres into the air, which also serves to clean the wings. Bacteria landing on the wing surface are not repelled; rather, their membranes are torn apart by the nanoscale-sized spikes, making the wing surface the first-known biomaterial that can kill bacteria.

=== Temperature regulation ===
Desert cicadas such as Diceroprocta apache are unusual among insects in controlling their temperature by evaporative cooling, analogous to sweating in mammals. When their temperature rises above about 39 °C (102 °F), they suck excess sap from the food plants and extrude the excess water through pores in the tergum at a modest cost in energy. Such a rapid loss of water can be sustained only by feeding on water-rich xylem sap. At lower temperatures, feeding cicadas would normally need to excrete the excess water. By evaporative cooling, desert cicadas can reduce their bodily temperature by some 5 °C. Some non-desert cicada species such as Magicicada tredecem also cool themselves evaporatively, but less dramatically. Conversely, many other cicadas can voluntarily raise their body temperatures as much as 22 °C (40 °F) above ambient temperature.

=== Song ===
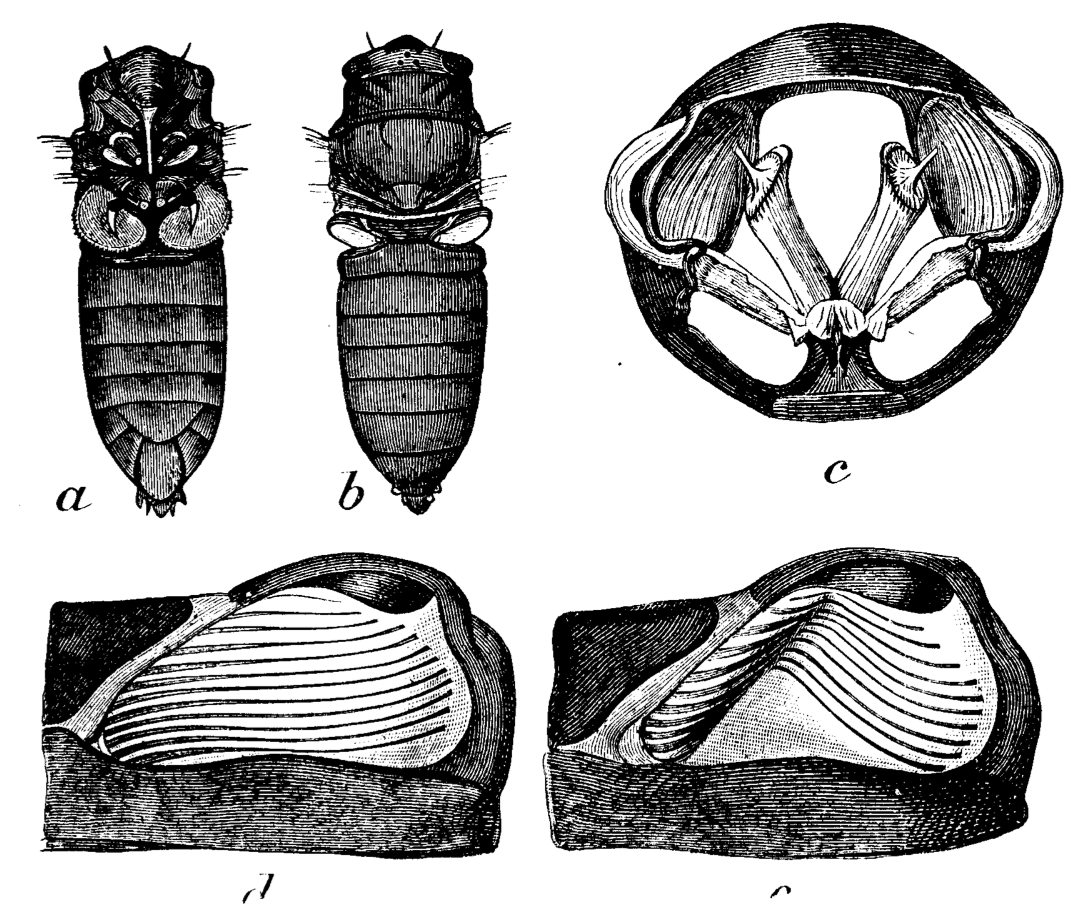
Cicada sound-producing organs and musculature: a, Body of male from below, showing cover-plates; b, From above, showing drumlike tymbals; c, Section, muscles that vibrate tymbals; d, A tymbal at rest; e, Thrown into vibration, as when singing

The "singing" of male cicadas is produced principally and in the majority of species using a special structure called a tymbal, a pair of which lies below each side of the anterior abdominal region. The structure is buckled by muscular action and, being made of resilin, unbuckles rapidly on muscle relaxation, producing their characteristic sounds. Some cicadas, however, have mechanisms for stridulation, sometimes in addition to the tymbals. Here, the wings are rubbed over a series of midthoracic ridges. In the Chinese species Subpsaltria yangi, both males and females can stridulate. The sounds may further be modulated by membranous coverings and by resonant cavities.

The male abdomen in some species is largely hollow, and acts as a sound box. By rapidly vibrating these membranes, a cicada combines the clicks into apparently continuous notes, and enlarged chambers derived from the tracheae serve as resonating chambers with which it amplifies the sound. The cicada also modulates the song by positioning its abdomen toward or away from the substrate (their perch). Partly by the pattern in which it combines the clicks, each species produces its own distinctive mating songs and acoustic signals, ensuring that the song attracts only appropriate mates. The tettigarctid (or hairy) cicadas have rudimentary tymbals in both sexes and do not produce airborne sounds, rather, both males and females produce vibrations that are transmitted through the tree they perch upon. They are considered as representing the original state from which other cicada communication has evolved.

Amphipsalta zelandica cicada song
Song, New Zealand, 2006

Cicada chorus in Japan
Chorus of Tanna japonensis, Japan, 2011

Cicadas in Greece
Chorus, Ithaca, 2008

A single Neotibicen superbus cicada calling
Song, Texas, 2012

Average temperature of the natural habitat for the South American species Fidicina rana is about 29 °C (84 °F). During sound production, the temperature of the tymbal muscles was found to be significantly higher. Many cicadas sing most actively during the hottest hours of a summer day; roughly a 24-hour cycle. Most cicadas are diurnal in their calling and depend on external heat to warm them up, while a few are capable of raising their temperatures using muscle action and some species are known to call at dusk. Kanakia gigas and Froggattoides typicus are among the few that are known to be truly nocturnal and there may be other nocturnal species living in tropical forests.

Cicadas call from varying heights on trees. Where multiple species occur, the species may use different heights and timing of calling. While the vast majority of cicadas call from above the ground, two Californian species, Okanagana pallidula and O. vanduzeei are known to call from hollows made at the base of the tree below the ground level. The adaptive significance is unclear, as the calls are not amplified or modified by the burrow structure, but this may avoid predation.

Although only males produce the cicadas' distinctive sounds, both sexes have membranous structures called tympana (singular – tympanum) by which they detect sounds, the equivalent of having ears. Males disable their own tympana while calling, thereby preventing damage to their hearing; a necessity partly because some cicadas produce sounds up to 120 dB (SPL) which is among the loudest of all insect-produced sounds. The song is loud enough to cause permanent hearing loss in humans should the cicada be at "close range". In contrast, some small species have songs so high in pitch that they are inaudible to humans.

For the human ear, telling precisely where a cicada song originates is often difficult. The pitch is nearly constant, the sound is continuous to the human ear, and cicadas sing in scattered groups. In addition to the mating song, many species have a distinct distress call, usually a broken and erratic sound emitted by the insect when seized or panicked. Some species also have courtship songs, generally quieter, and produced after a female has been drawn to the calling song. Males also produce encounter calls, whether in courtship or to maintain personal space within choruses.

The songs of cicadas are considered by entomologists to be unique to a given species, and a number of resources exist to collect and analyse cicada sounds.

=== Life cycle ===
In some species of cicadas, the males remain in one location and call to attract females. Sometimes, several males aggregate and call in chorus. In other species, the males move from place to place, usually with quieter calls, while searching for females. The Tettigarctidae differ from other cicadas in producing vibrations in the substrate rather than audible sounds. After mating, the female cuts slits into the bark of a twig where she deposits her eggs. Both male and female cicadas die within a few weeks after emerging from the soil. Although they have mouthparts and are able to consume some plant liquids for nutrition, the amount eaten is very small and the insects have a natural adult lifespan of less than two months.

When the eggs hatch, the newly hatched nymphs drop to the ground and burrow. Cicadas live underground as nymphs for most of their lives at depths of about 6–24 in (15–61 cm). Nymphs have strong front legs for digging and excavating chambers near to roots, where they feed on xylem sap. In the process, their bodies and interior of the burrow become coated in anal fluids. In wet habitats, larger species construct mud towers above ground to aerate their burrows. In the final nymphal instar, they construct an exit tunnel to the surface and emerge. They then molt (shed their skins) on a nearby plant for the last time, and emerge as adults. The exuviae or abandoned exoskeletons remain, still clinging to the bark of the tree.

Most cicadas go through a life cycle that lasts 2–5 years. Some species have much longer life cycles, such as the North American genus, Magicicada, which has a number of distinct "broods" that go through either a 17-year (Brood XIII), or in some parts of the region, a 13-year (Brood XIX) life cycle The long life cycles may have developed as a response to predators, such as the cicada killer wasp and praying mantis. A specialist predator with a shorter life cycle of at least two years could not reliably prey upon the cicadas; for example, a 17-year cicada with a predator with a five-year life cycle will only be threatened by a peak predator population every 85 (5 × 17) years, while a non-prime cycle such as 15 would be endangered at every year of emergence. An alternate hypothesis is that these long life cycles evolved during the ice ages so as to overcome cold spells, and that as species co-emerged and hybridized, they left distinct species that did not hybridize having periods matching prime numbers. The 13- and 17-year cicadas only emerge in the midwestern and eastern US in the same year every 221 years (13 × 17), with 2024 being the first such year since 1803.

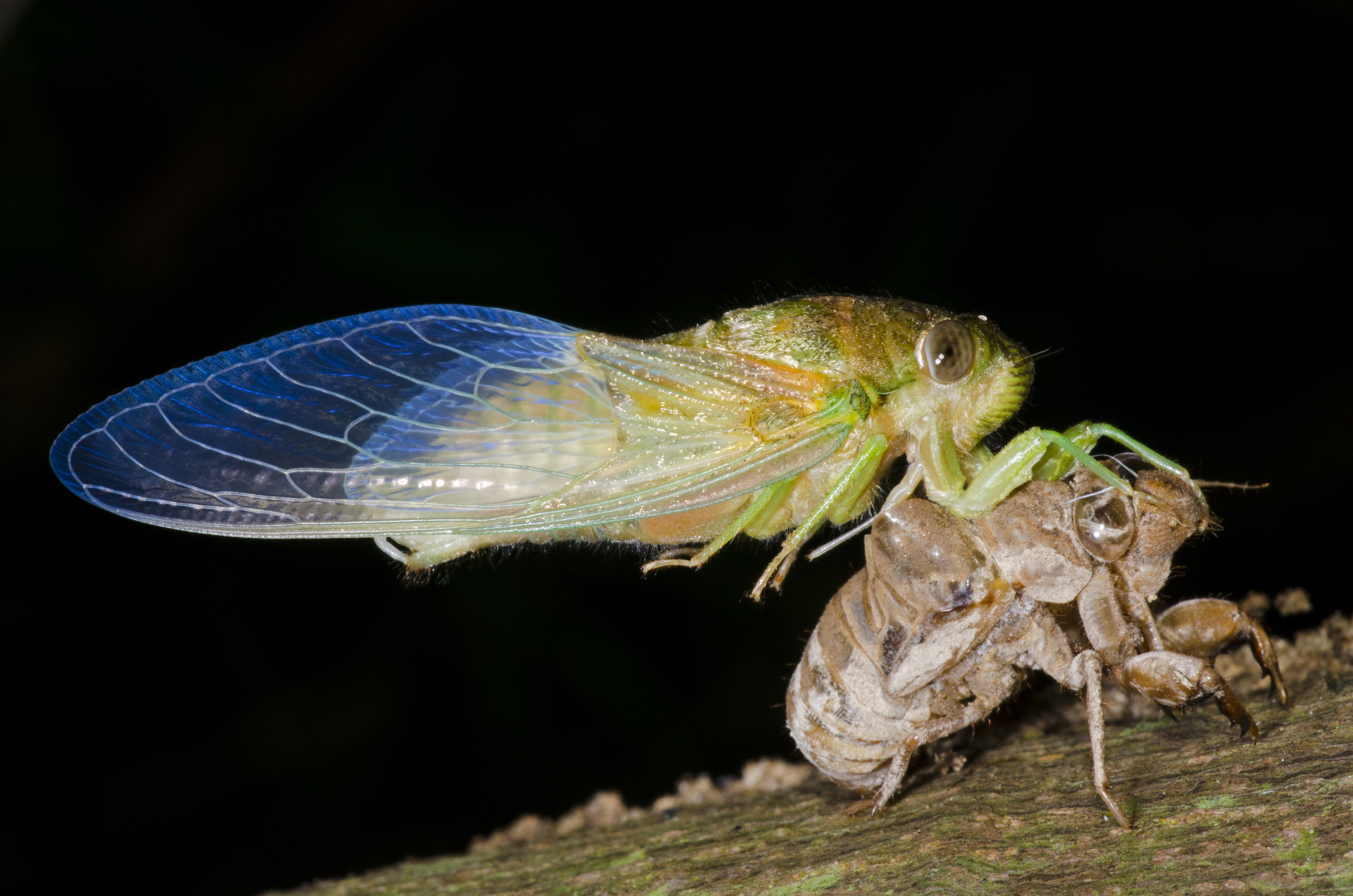
A teneral cicada that has just emerged and is waiting to dry before flying away

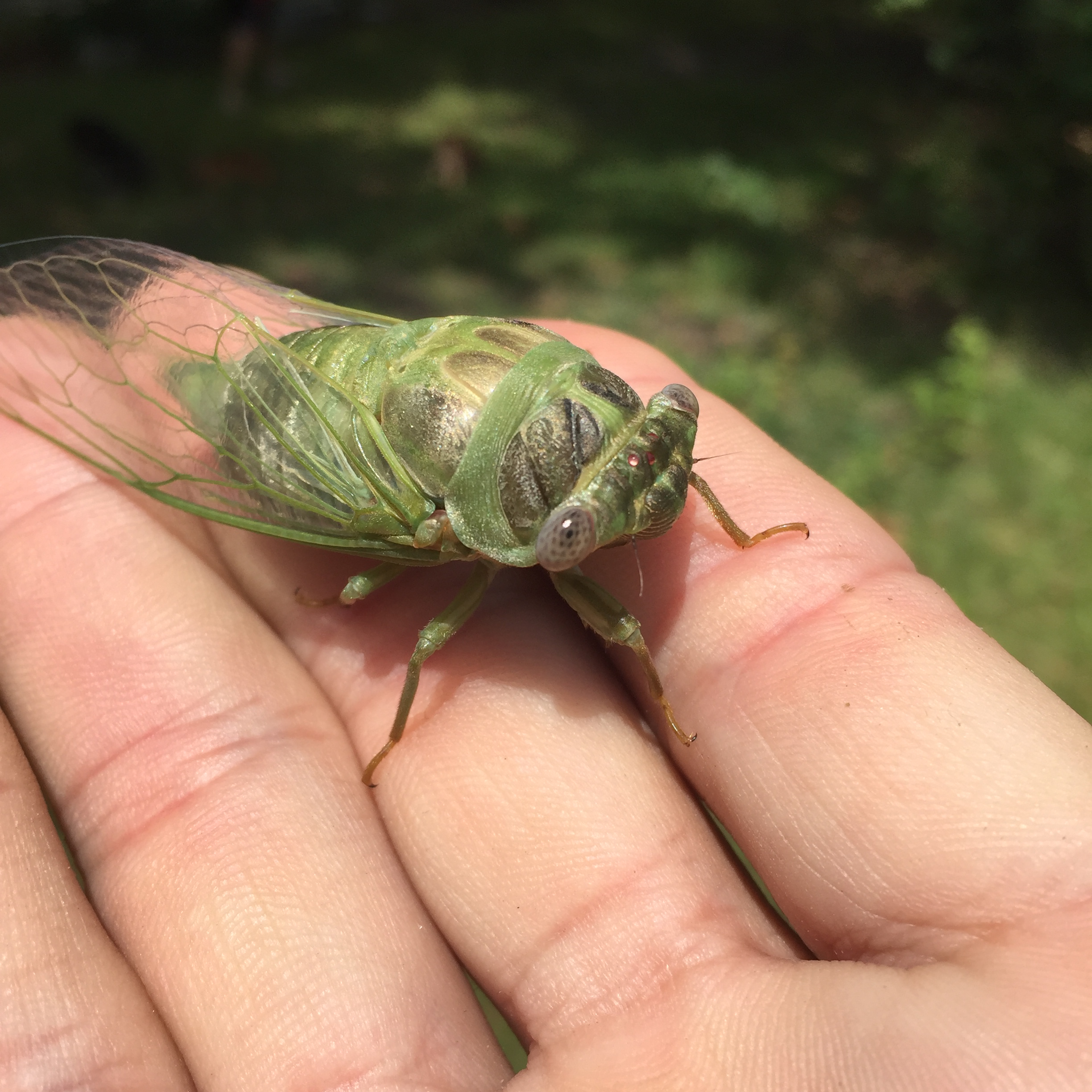
Newly emerged adult cicada held on human fingers

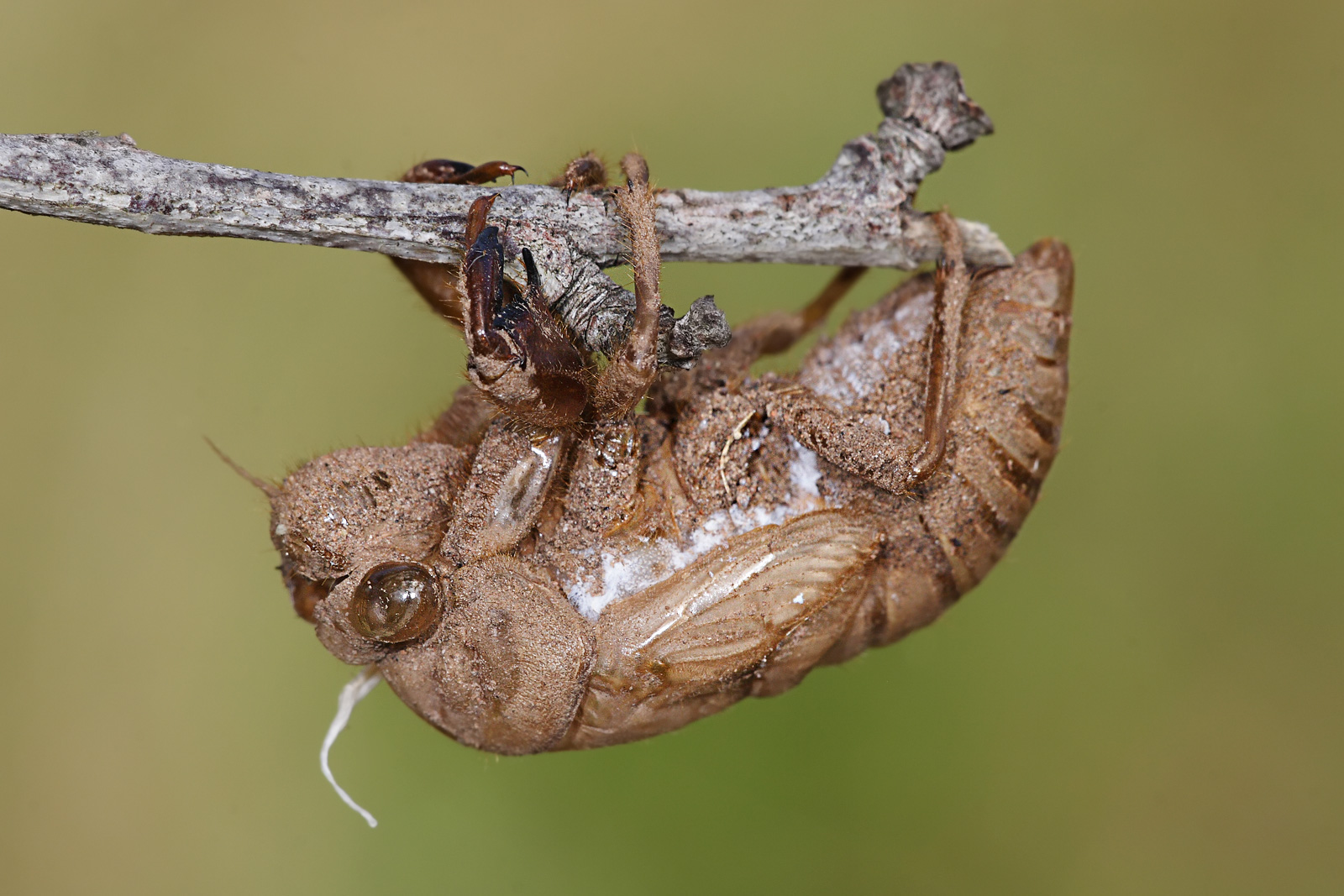
Cicada exuviae after the adult cicada has left

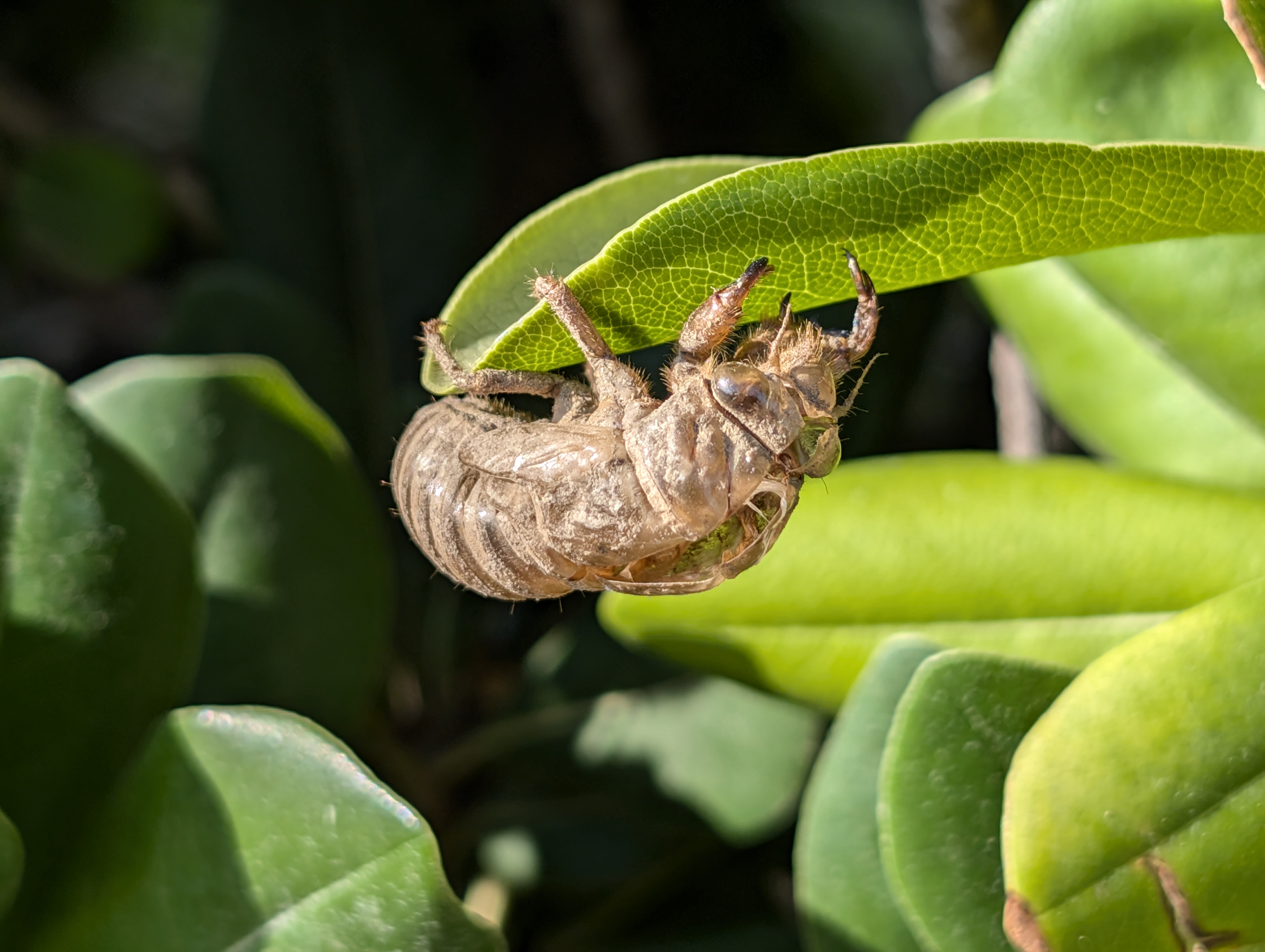
Cicada exuviae clinging to a leaf

=== Diet ===
Cicada nymphs drink sap from the xylem of various species of trees, including oak, cypress, willow, ash, and maple. While common folklore indicates that adults do not eat, they actually do drink plant sap using their sucking mouthparts.

Cicadas excrete fluid in streams of droplets due to their high volume consumption of xylem sap. The jets of urine that cicadas produce have a velocity of up to 3 meters per second, making them the fastest among all assessed animals, including mammals like elephants and horses.

=== Locomotion ===
Cicadas, unlike other Auchenorrhyncha, are not adapted for jumping (saltation). They have the usual insect modes of locomotion, walking and flight, but they do not walk or run well, and take to the wing to travel distances greater than a few centimetres.

== Predators, parasites, and pathogens ==
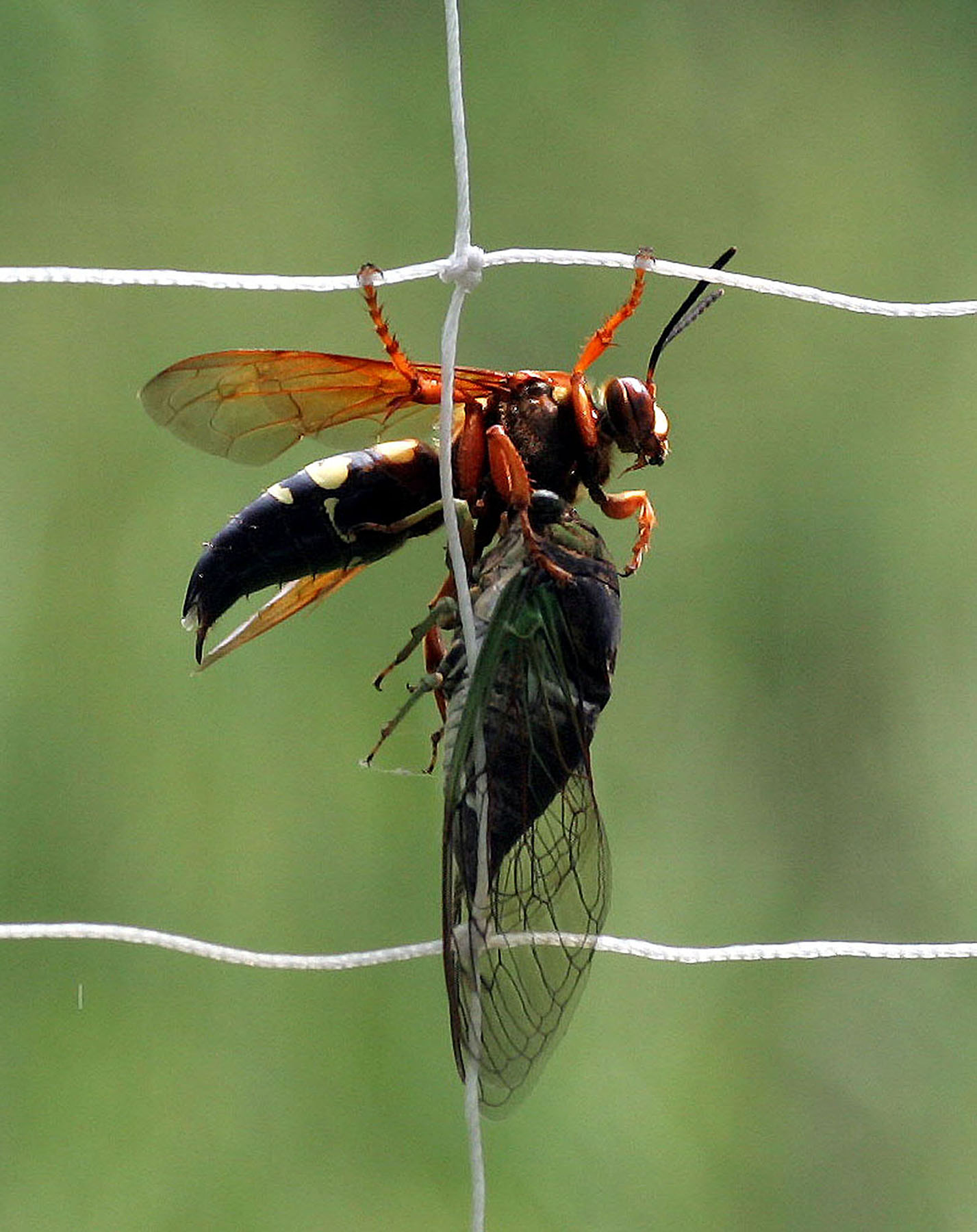
Eastern cicada killer wasp (Sphecius speciosus) with cicada prey, United States

Cicadas are commonly eaten by birds and mammals, as well as bats, wasps, mantises, spiders, and robber flies. In times of mass emergence of cicadas, various amphibians, fish, reptiles, mammals, and birds change their foraging habits so as to benefit from the glut. Newly hatched nymphs may be eaten by ants, and nymphs living underground are preyed on by burrowing mammals such as moles. In northern Japan, brown bears prey on final instar nymphs of cicadas during summer by digging up the ground. In Australia, cicadas are preyed on by the Australian cicada killer wasp (Exeirus lateritius), which stings and stuns cicadas high in the trees, making them drop to the ground, where the cicada hunter mounts and carries them, pushing with its hind legs, sometimes over a distance of 100 m, until they can be shoved down into its burrow, where the numb cicadas are placed onto one of many shelves in a "catacomb", to form the food stock for the wasp grub that grows out of the egg deposited there. A katydid predator from Australia is capable of attracting singing male cicadas of a variety of species by imitating the timed click replies of sexually receptive female cicadas, which respond in pair formation by flicking their wings. Their prime-number life cycle prevents predators with a life cycle of two or more years from synchronising with their emergence.

Several fungal diseases infect and kill adult cicadas, while other fungi in the genera Ophiocordyceps and Isaria attack nymphs. Massospora cicadina specifically attacks the adults of periodical cicadas, the spores remaining dormant in the soil between outbreaks. This fungus is also capable of dosing cicadas with psilocybin, the psychedelic drug found in magic mushrooms, as well as cathinone, an alkaloid similar to various amphetamines. These chemicals alter the behaviour of the cicadas, driving males to copulate, including attempts with males, and is thought to be beneficial to the fungus, as the fungal spores are dispersed by a larger number of infected carriers.

Plants can also defend themselves against cicadas. Although cicadas can feed on the roots of gymnosperms, it has been found that resinous conifers such as pine do not allow the eggs of Magicicada to hatch, the resin sealing up the egg cavities.

=== Antipredator adaptations ===
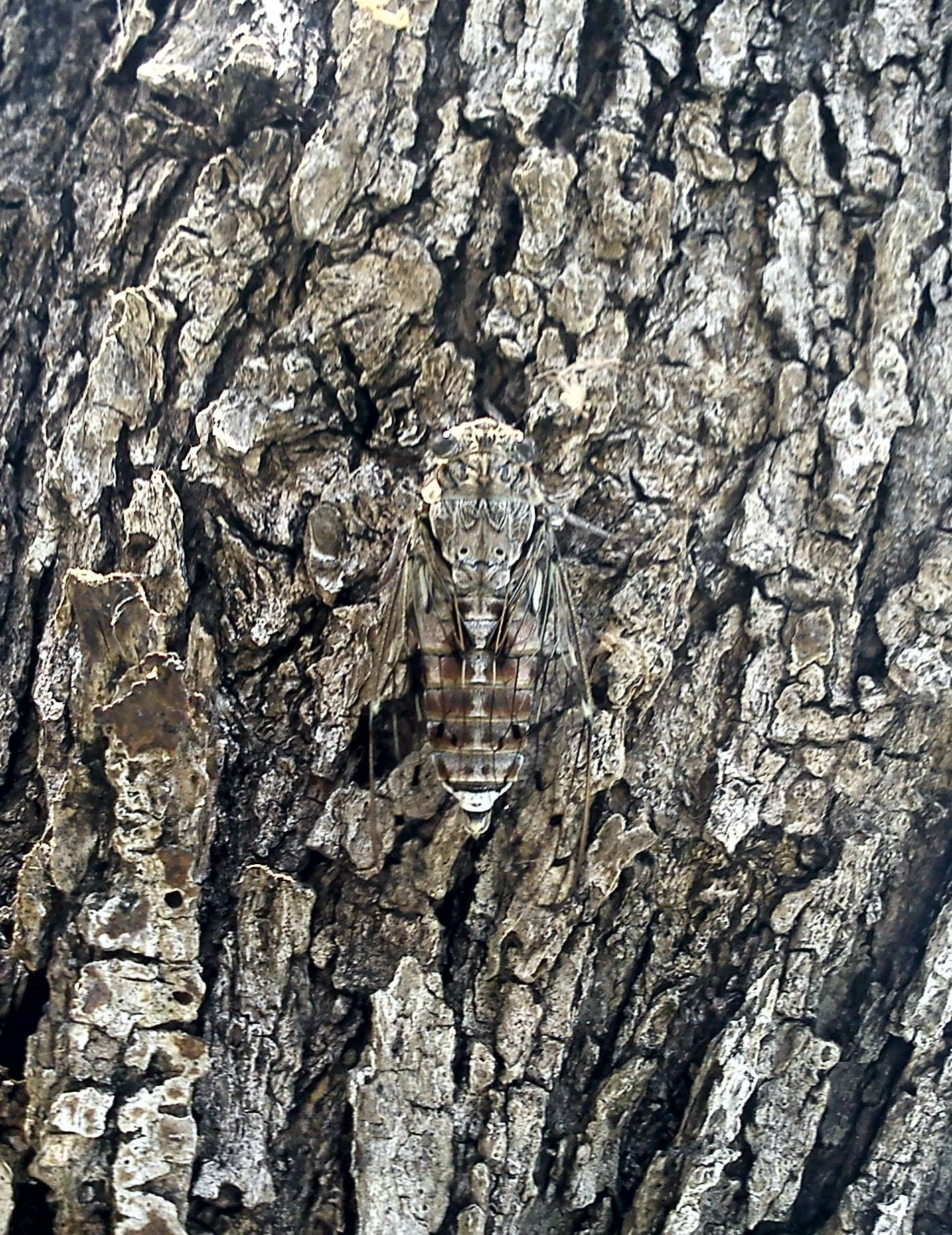
Cicada disruptively camouflaged on an olive tree

Cicadas use a variety of strategies to evade predators. Large cicadas can fly rapidly to escape if disturbed. Many are extremely well camouflaged to evade predators such as birds that hunt by sight. Being coloured like tree bark and disruptively patterned to break up their outlines, they are difficult to discern; their partly transparent wings are held over the body and pressed close to the substrate. Some cicada species play dead when threatened.

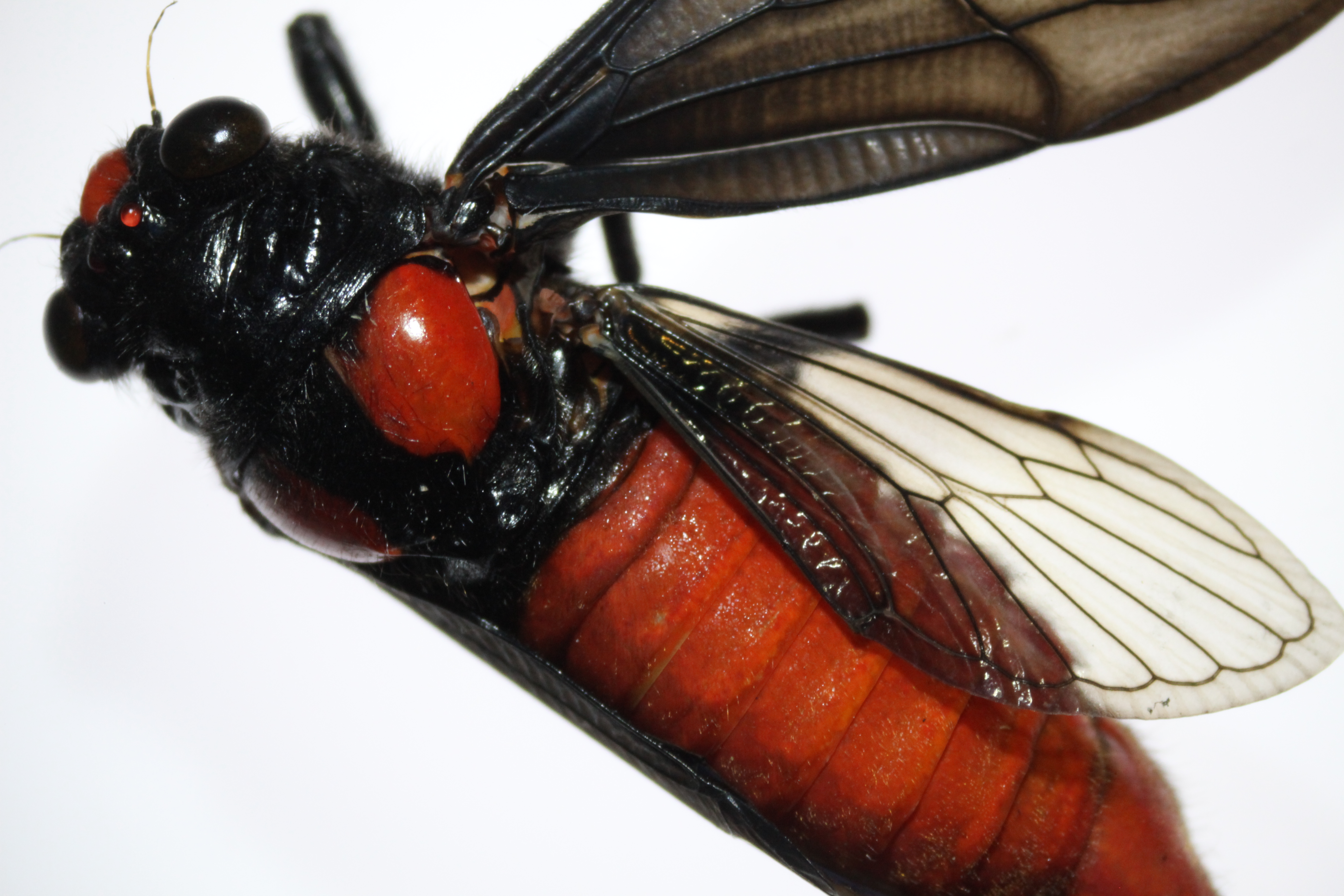
The day-flying cicada Huechys sanguinea warns off predators with its aposematic red and black coloration. (Southeast Asia)

Some cicadas such as Hemisciera maculipennis display bright deimatic flash coloration on their hind wings when threatened; the sudden contrast helps to startle predators, giving the cicadas time to escape. Most cicadas are diurnal and rely on camouflage when at rest, but some species use aposematism-related Batesian mimicry, wearing the bright colors that warn of toxicity in other animals; the Malaysian Huechys sanguinea has conspicuous red and black warning coloration, is diurnal, and boldly flies about in full view of possible predators.

Predators such as the sarcophagid fly Emblemasoma hunt cicadas by sound, being attracted to their songs. Singing males soften their song so that the attention of the listener gets distracted to neighbouring louder singers, or cease singing altogether as a predator approaches. A loud cicada song, especially in chorus, has been asserted to repel predators, but observations of predator responses refute the claim.

== In human culture ==
=== In art and literature ===
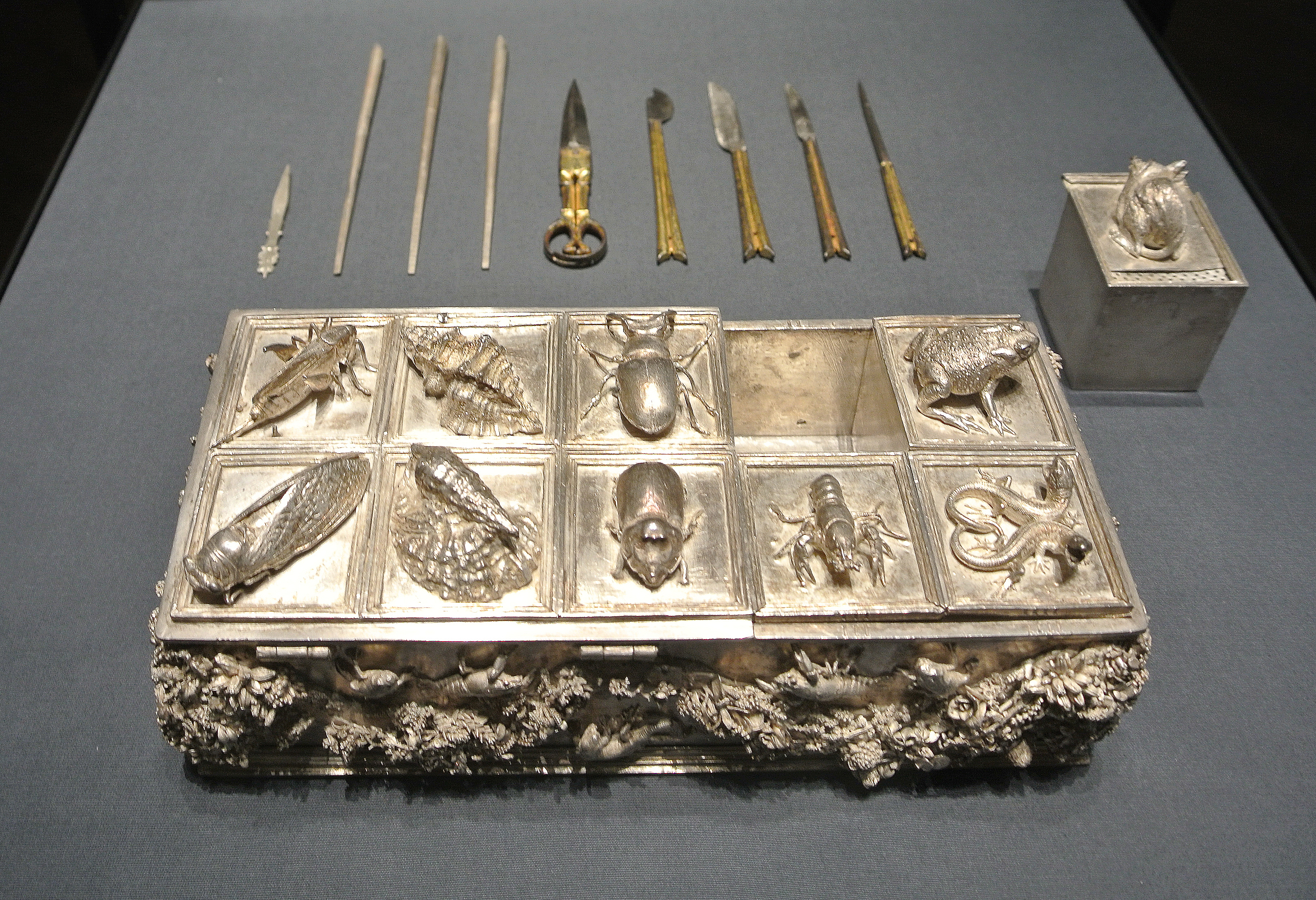
Silver casket with writing utensils, made by the Nuremberg goldsmith Wenzel Jamnitzer (1507/08–1585): a silver cicada is at lower left.

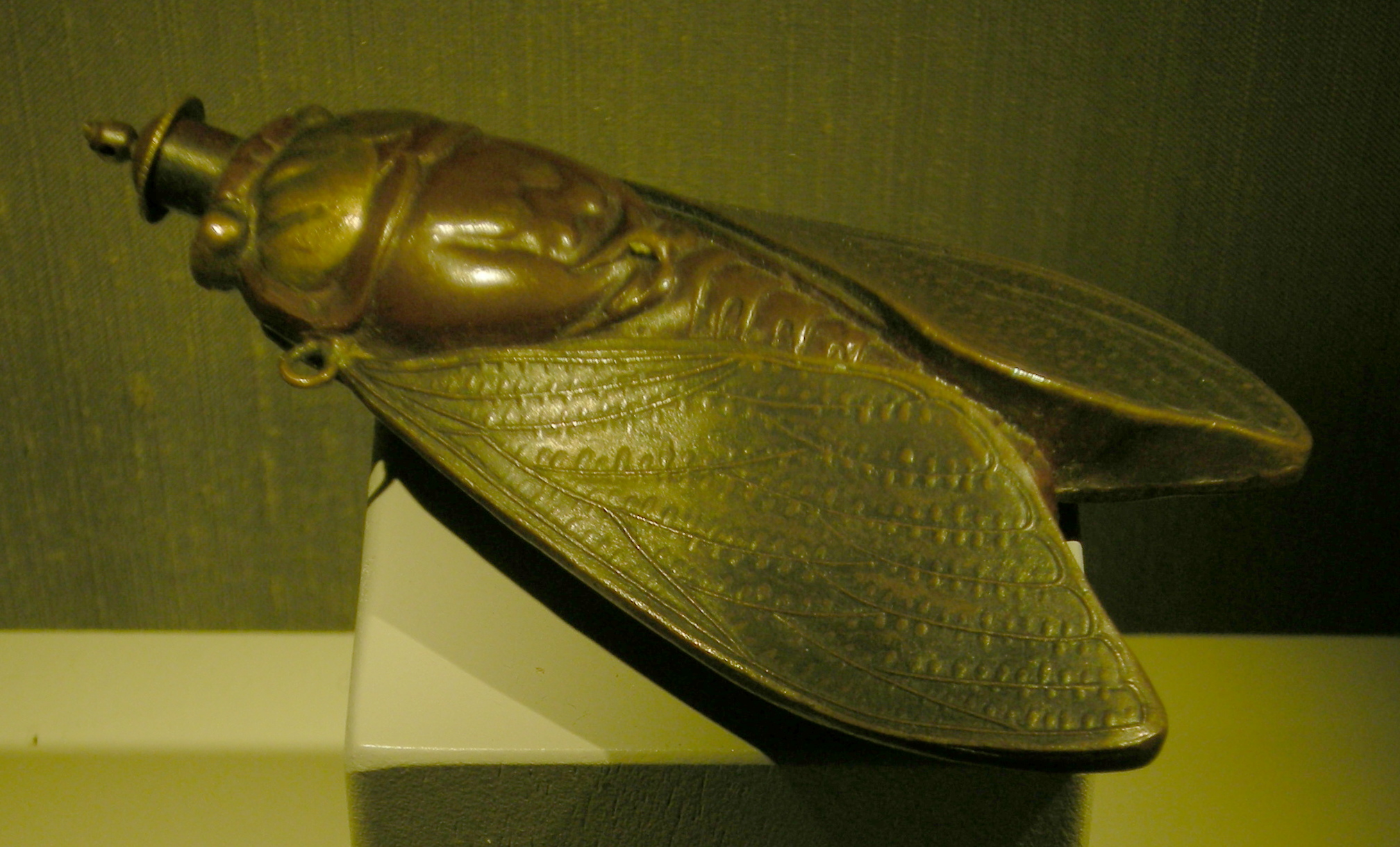
Japanese snuff bottle in the form of a cicada, c. 1900

Cicadas have been featured in literature since the time of Homer's Iliad, and as motifs in decorative art from the Chinese Shang dynasty (1766–1122 BCE). (Note: See for instance the nephrite cicada from the Han dynasty (c. 210 BCE) in the San Francisco Asian Art Museum.) They are described by Aristotle in his History of Animals and by Pliny the Elder in his Natural History; their mechanism of sound production is mentioned by Hesiod in his poem "Works and Days": "when the Skolymus flowers, and the tuneful Tettix sitting on his tree in the weary summer season pours forth from under his wings his shrill song". In the classic 14th-century Chinese novel Romance of the Three Kingdoms, Diaochan took her name from the sable (diāo) tails and jade decorations in the shape of cicadas (chán), which adorned the hats of high-level officials.

In the Japanese novel The Tale of Genji, the title character poetically likens one of his many love interests to a cicada for the way she delicately sheds her robe the way a cicada sheds its shell when molting. Cicada exuviae play a role in the manga Winter Cicada. Cicadas are a frequent subject of haiku, where, depending on type, they can indicate spring, summer, or autumn. Shaun Tan's illustrated book Cicada tells the story of a hardworking but underappreciated cicada working in an office. Branden Jacobs-Jenkins's play Appropriate takes place on an Arkansas farm in summer, and calls for the sounds of mating cicadas to underscore the entire show.

=== In fashion ===
Being lightweight, and with hooklike legs, the exuviae of cicadas can be used as hair or clothing accessories.

=== As food and folk medicine ===
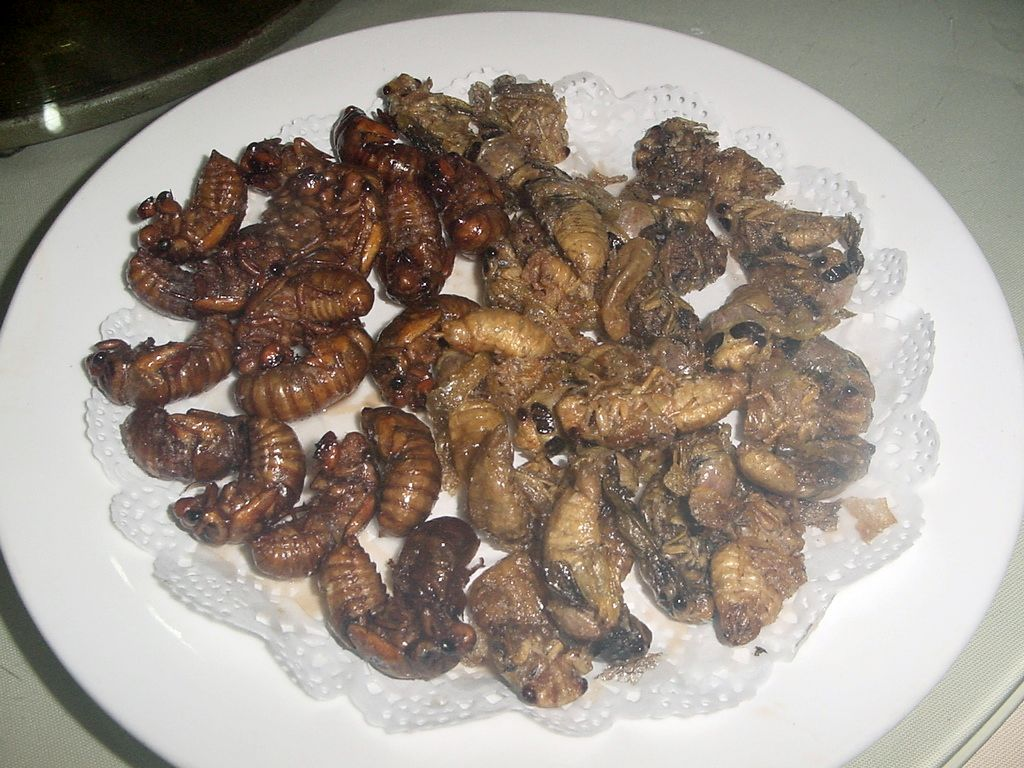
Deep-fried Cryptotympana atrata in Shandong cuisine

Cicadas were eaten in Ancient Greece, and are consumed in selected regions in modern China, both as adults and (more often) as nymphs. Cicadas are also eaten in Malaysia, Burma, North America, and central Africa, as well as the Balochistan region of Pakistan, especially in Ziarat. Female cicadas are prized for being meatier. Shells of cicadas are employed in traditional Chinese medicines, claiming that they possess anti-convulsive, sedative, and hypothermic effects. The 17-year "Onondaga Brood" Magicicada is culturally important and a particular delicacy to the Onondaga people, and are considered a novelty food item by modern consumers in several states.

=== In music ===
Cicadas are featured in the protest song "Como La Cigarra" ("Like the Cicada") written by Argentinian poet and composer María Elena Walsh. In the song, the cicada is a symbol of survival and defiance against death. The song was recorded by Mercedes Sosa, among other Latin American musicians.

In North America and Mexico, there is a well-known song, "La Cigarra" ("The Cicada"), written by Raymundo Perez Soto, which is a song in the Mariachi tradition, that romanticises the insect as a creature that sings until it dies.

Brazilian artist Lenine with his track "Malvadeza" from the album Chão, creates a song built upon the sound of the cicada that can be heard along the track.

Cicada sounds heavily feature on the 2021 album Solar Power by New Zealand artist Lorde. She described cicada song as being emblematic of the New Zealand summer.

=== In mythology and folklore ===
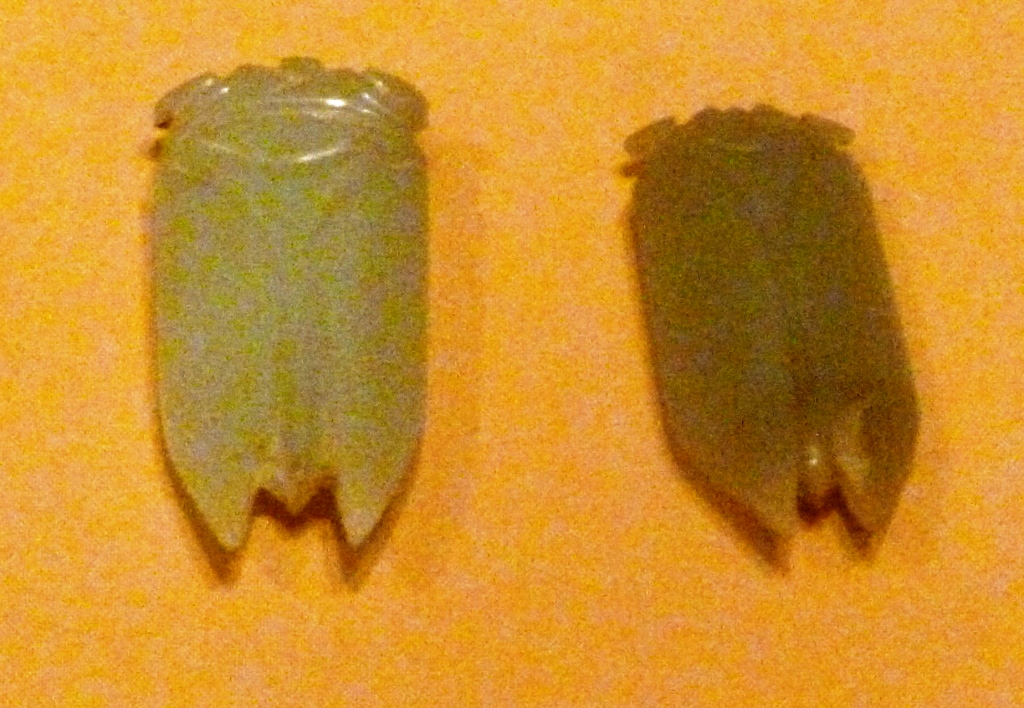
Jade cicada amulets. Western Han Dynasty 206 BCE – CE 8

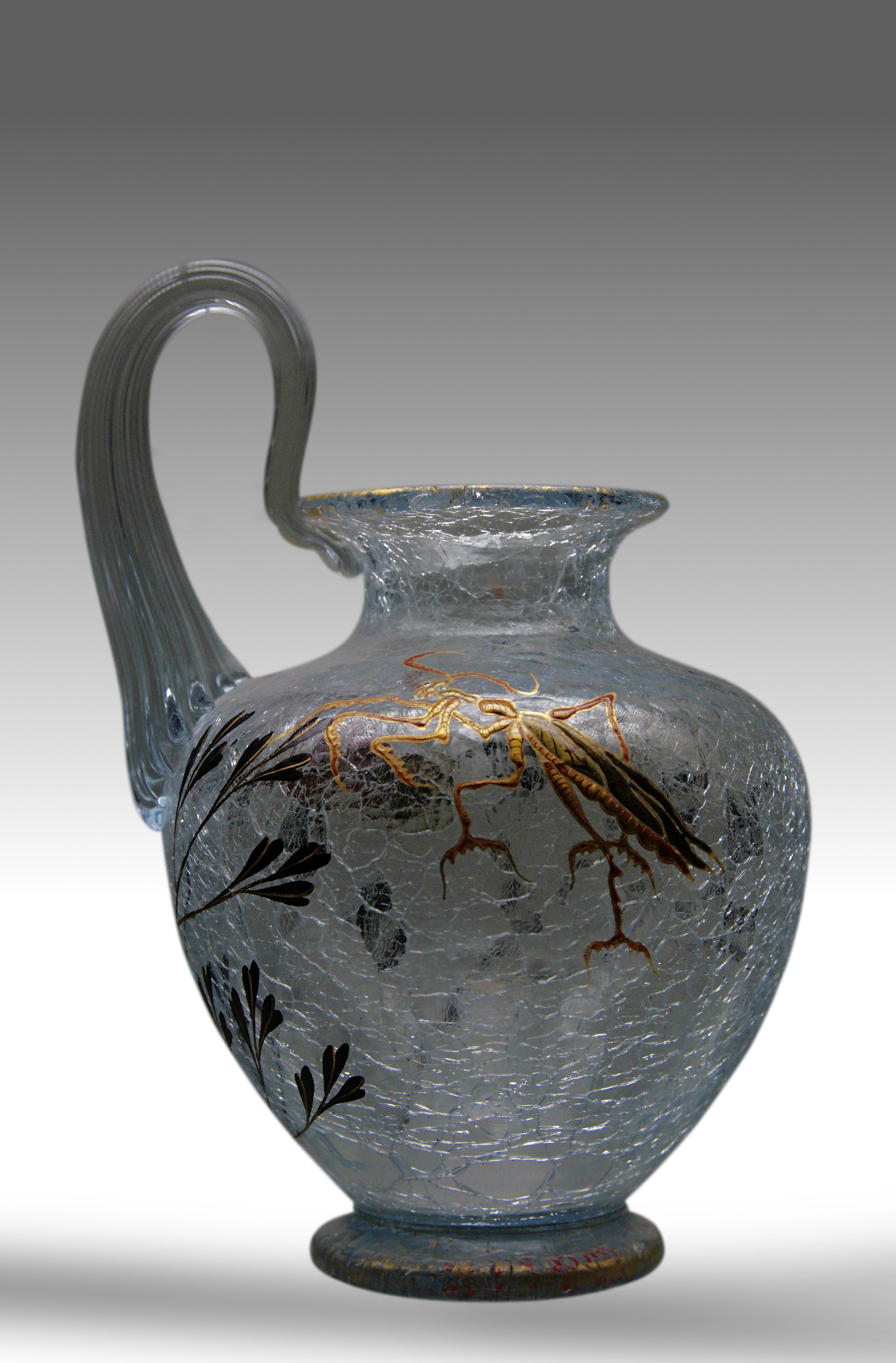
Small crackle-glass vase, Émile Gallé, circa 1880. Decoration of a cicada on one side

Cicadas have been used as monetary symbols, in folk medicine, to forecast the weather, to provide song (in China), and in folklore and myths around the world. In France, the cicada represents the folklore of Provence and the Mediterranean cities.

The cicada has represented insouciance since classical antiquity. Jean de La Fontaine began his collection of fables Les fables de La Fontaine with the story "La Cigale et la Fourmi" ("The Cicada and the Ant") based on one of Aesop's fables; in it, the cicada spends the summer singing, while the ant stores away food, and the cicada finds herself without food when the weather turns bitter.

In Chinese tradition, the cicada (蟬, chán) symbolises rebirth and immortality. In the Chinese essay "Thirty-Six Stratagems", the phrase "to shed the golden cicada skin" (simplified Chinese: 金蝉脱壳; traditional Chinese: 金蟬脫殼; pinyin: jīnchán tuōqiào) is the poetic name for using a decoy (leaving the exuviae) to fool enemies. In the Chinese classic novel Journey to the West (16th century), the protagonist Priest of Tang was named the Golden Cicada.

In Japan, the cicada is associated with the summer season. For many Japanese people, summer hasn't officially begun until the first songs of the cicada are heard. According to Lafcadio Hearn, the song of Meimuna opalifera, called tsuku-tsuku boshi, is said to indicate the end of summer, and it is called so because of its particular call.

In the Homeric Hymn to Aphrodite, the goddess Aphrodite retells the legend of how Eos, the goddess of the dawn, requested Zeus to let her lover Tithonus live forever as an immortal. Zeus granted her request, but because Eos forgot to ask him to also make Tithonus ageless, Tithonus never died, but he did grow old. Eventually, he became so tiny and shriveled that he turned into the first cicada. The Greeks also used a cicada sitting on a harp as an emblem of music.

In Kapampangan mythology in the Philippines, the goddess of dusk, Sisilim, is said to be greeted by the sounds and appearances of cicadas whenever she appears.

=== As pests ===
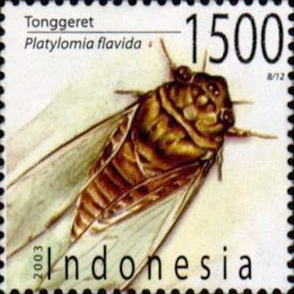
Platylomia flavida, 2003 stamp

Cicadas feed on sap; they do not bite or sting in a true sense but may occasionally mistake a person's arm for a plant limb and attempt to feed, sometimes causing slight discomfort. Male cicadas produce very loud calls that can damage human hearing.

Cicadas are not major agricultural pests, but in some outbreak years, trees may be overwhelmed by the sheer numbers of females laying their eggs in the shoots. Small trees may wilt and larger trees may lose small branches. Although in general, the feeding activities of the nymphs do little damage, during the year before an outbreak of periodic cicadas, the large nymphs feed heavily and plant growth may suffer. Some species have turned from wild grasses to sugarcane, which affects the crop adversely, and in a few isolated cases, females have oviposited on cash crops such as date palms, grape vines, citrus trees, asparagus, and cotton.

Cicadas sometimes cause damage to ornamental shrubs and trees, mainly in the form of scarring left on tree branches where the females have laid their eggs. Branches of young trees may die as a result.

== See also ==
- Cicada 3301 – Internet puzzle and mystery
- List of Cicadidae genera
