= Fumipennis =

Fumipennis may refer to:

- Bucaea fumipennis, species of moth
- Ceramidia fumipennis, species of moth
- Cerceris fumipennis, species of wasp
- Diduga fumipennis, species of moth
- Eupeodes fumipennis, species of hover fly
- Hierodula fumipennis, species of praying mantis
- Megachile fumipennis, species of bee
- Psaltoda fumipennis, species of cicada
- Pseudatteria fumipennis, species of moth
- Soloe fumipennis, species of moth
- Tabanus fumipennis, species of horse fly
- Uclesia fumipennis, species of fly
- Udea fumipennis, species of moth
