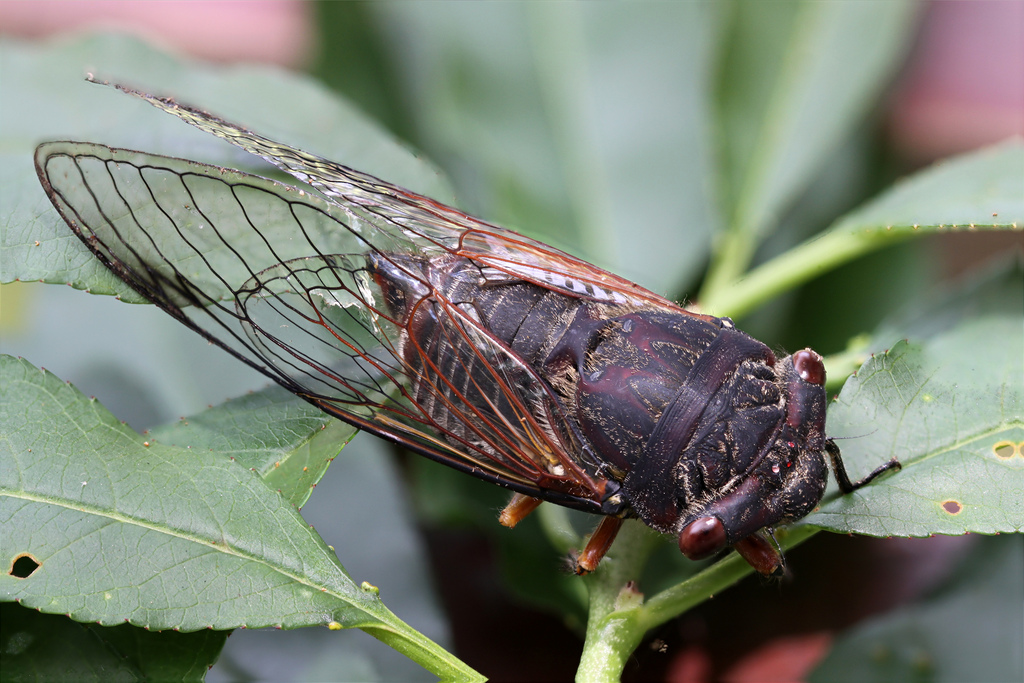

Scientific classification
- Kingdom: Animalia
- Phylum: Arthropoda
- Clade: Pancrustacea
- Class: Insecta
- Order: Hemiptera
- Suborder: Auchenorrhyncha
- Family: Cicadidae
- Genus: Psaltoda
- Species: P. plaga

Binomial name
- Psaltoda plaga (Walker, 1850)

Synonyms
- Cicada argentata Germar, 1834; Cicada plaga Walker, 1850; Psaltoda argentata (Germar)

Audio

= Psaltoda plaga =

Species of true bug

Psaltoda plaga is a species of cicada native to eastern Australia, from Maryborough in central Queensland to Bega in southern New South Wales. Adult cicadas appear over the summer and inhabit forested areas near bodies of water. The predominantly black form from the Sydney and Central Coast regions is commonly known as the black prince, while the term silver knight is used for the species as a whole.

== Taxonomy ==
The black prince was originally described by German naturalist Ernst Friedrich Germar in 1834 as Cicada argentata, the species name derived from the Latin argentum "silver". Swedish entomologist Carl Stål defined the new genus Psaltoda in 1861 with three species, including the black prince as Psaltoda argentata. Meanwhile, English entomologist Francis Walker described Cicada plaga in 1850 as well as querying further specimens as Cicada argentata. He noted in 1858 that the binomial Cicada argentata had been used by a European species, and declared that Germar's cicada needed a new name. The older combination was ruled invalid as the binomial name Cicada argentata had been originally used for a European cicada now known as Cicadetta argentata, and the black prince became Psaltoda plaga.

Psaltoda mossi is similar to P. plaga in colour and brown discoloration on the wing, but has its prominent postclypeus and large abdominal tergite 3 suggest a closer relationship with P. flavescens. Psaltoda harrisii is also similar, but is smaller and lacks the wing infuscation. Relationships of the members of the genus Psaltoda remain unclear pending a full phylogenetic investigation.

The name black prince was in popular use by 1923. It was reported by McKeown in 1942 as referring to a dark form of the green grocer (Cyclochila australasiae forma spreta), but was later linked to Psaltoda plaga. It is used for the darker form of the species, while the name silver knight is used for the olive and green colour forms.

== Description ==
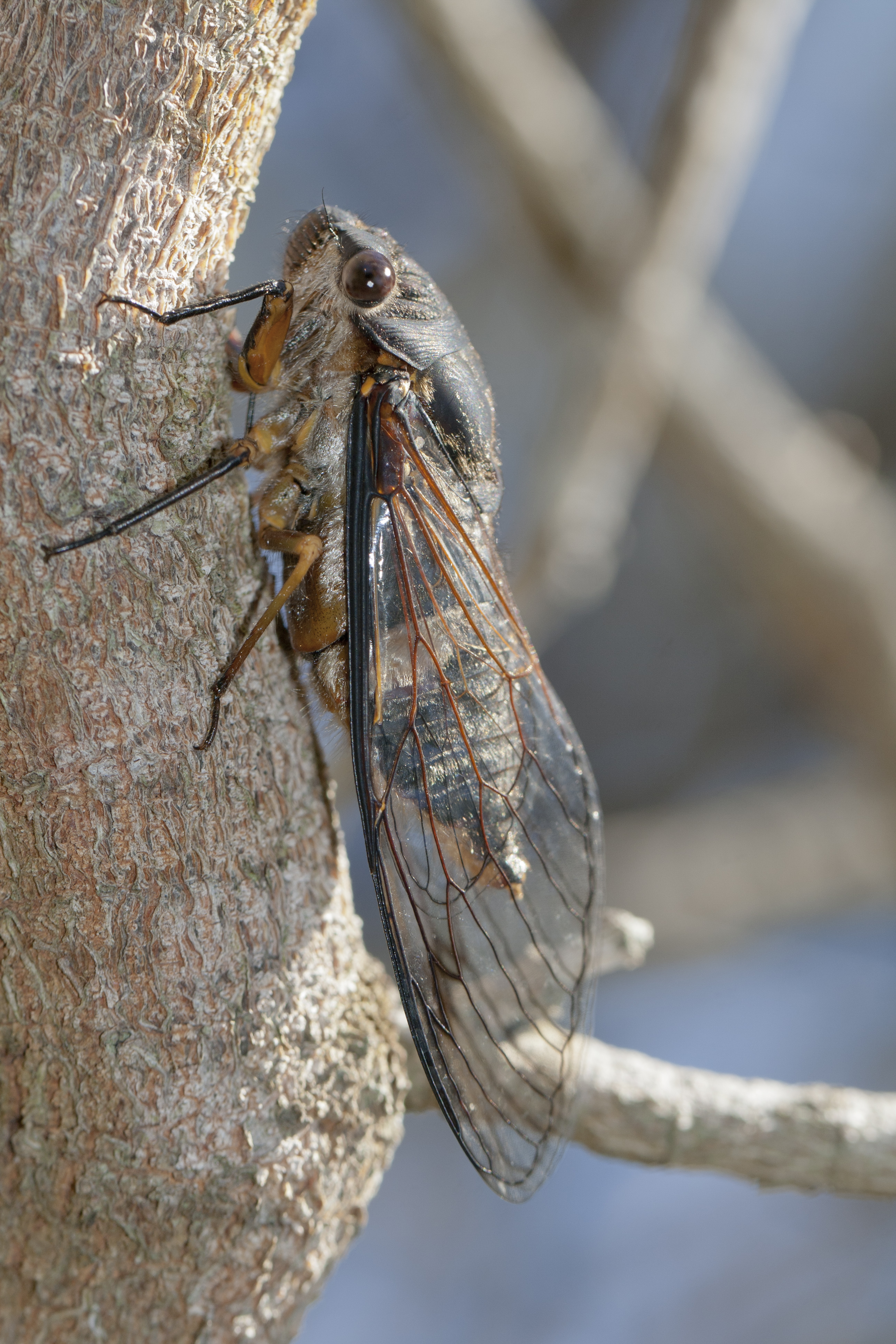
Side view of a black prince

This species can be recognised by its forewing having a zigzag infuscation (dark marking) near the apex, while the hindwing lacks an infuscation around the border (unlike the related P. moerens). Adult males have forewing length of 38-47 mm, while adult females are slightly smaller with forewing length 37-45 mm.

The colour of adult male black prince varies with age and locality. Around Sydney north to the Hunter River, it is very dark, predominantly black, with some brown markings; the abdomen black above and brown below. The eyes are brown. Further north from Brunswick Heads to Coolum Beach, the black prince exhibits more green markings instead of brown, and is lighter overall in coloration. Individuals with green and black markings resemble the green baron (Psaltoda magnifica) of North Queensland.

There are two components of the call; a rhythmic revving, which is more prevalent when the weather is cooler, and a continuous call, more common in hot weather.

== Distribution and habitat ==
The black prince is found from the vicinity of Maryborough in Queensland through eastern New South Wales to Bega on the state's south coast. Although it can reach as far inland as Stanthorpe, Warwick, Inverell, Coonabarabran, Molong and Cowra, it is generally more abundant in coastal areas. It may occur locally in massive numbers, at times in mountainous areas up to 1,000 m (3,300 ft) altitude, with swarms of cicadas in some summers. They were recorded as appearing every year, mainly between December and March in western Sydney.

Some permanent water such as rivers and swamps is a prerequisite for habitat, and trees preferred include broad-leaved paperbark (Melaleuca quinquenervia), mangroves, and river sheoak (Casuarina cunninghamiana), as well as rough-barked apple (Angophora floribunda), English sycamore (Acer pseudoplatanus) and weeping willow (Salix babylonica). The species was associated with white feather honeymyrtle (Melaleuca decora) and swamp sheoak (Casuarina glauca) in a study at three sites in western Sydney. Cicadas perch on branches rather than the trunk.

== Life cycle ==
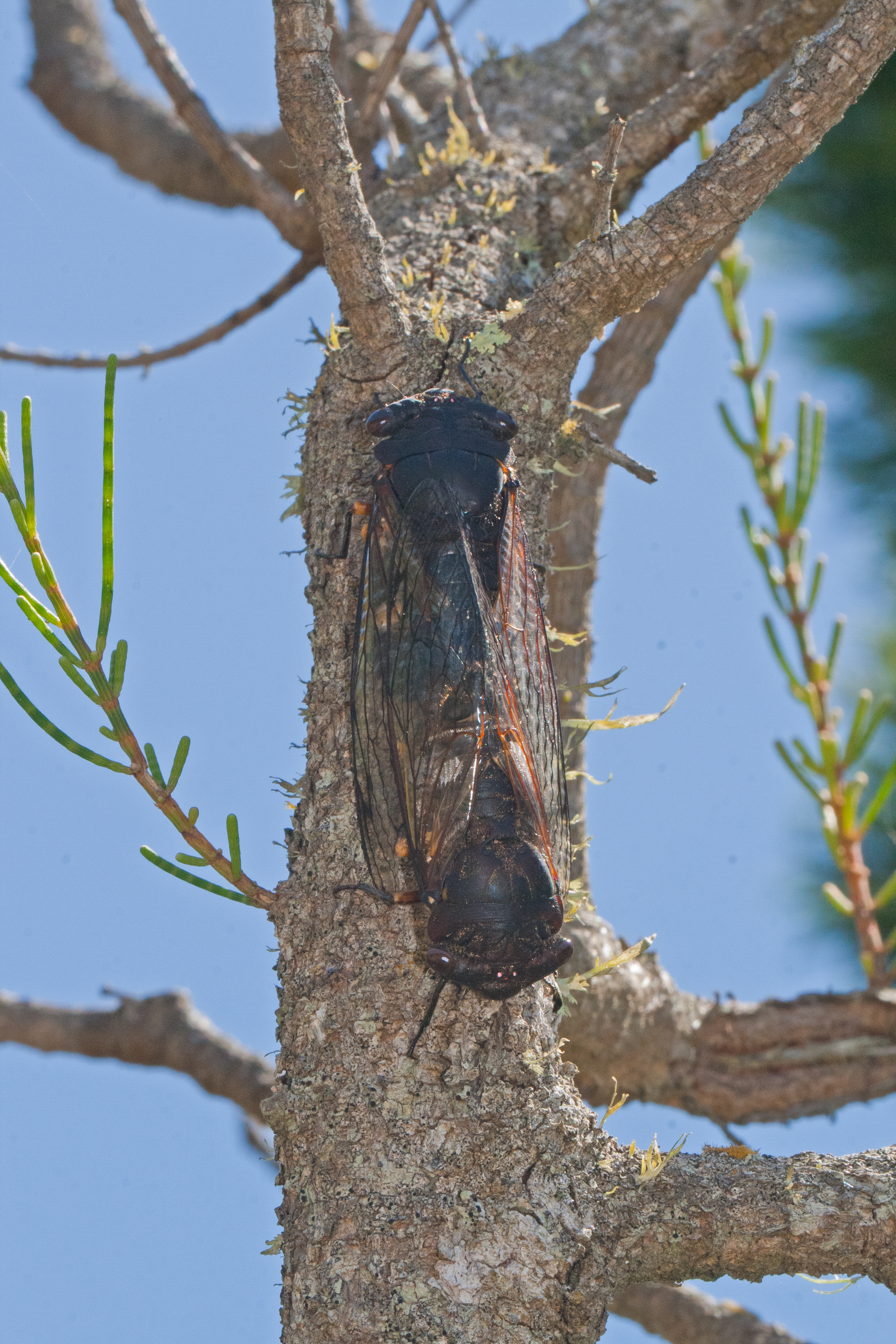
Adults mating on a she-oak

The cicada spends seven years underground in nymph form drinking sap from the roots of plants before emerging from the Ground as an adult. Species on which it feeds include weeping willow, river sheoak, rough-barked apple and various eucalypts. The adults, which live for four weeks, fly around, mate, and breed over the summer.

In one field study in southeastern Queensland, black princes emerged en masse over a 10- to 15-day period in late November to early December, with successive nymphs emerging in gradually fewer numbers over the following 75–80 days until early March. At peak emerging periods, up to 300 cicadas would alight on a single tree.

== Predators ==
A 1995 paper found that the black prince and related redeye (Psaltoda moerens) are favoured food items of the noisy friarbird, which swallows them head-first and whole. The width of its gape size is similar to that of the two cicada species. Red wattlebirds have been found to ignore the cicadas, possibly because their gapes are not wide enough to accommodate swallowing them whole. Noisy miners, blue-faced honeyeaters, little wattlebirds, grey and pied butcherbirds, magpie-larks, Torresian crows, white-faced herons and even the nocturnal tawny frogmouth, have all been reported as significant predators. The frogmouths and bearded dragons have been observed feeding on emerging nymphs, however total nymphal mortality is estimated at under 10%. The black prince is also preyed upon by the cicada killer wasp (Exeirus lateritius), which stings and paralyses the cicada before storing it in its burrow with the wasp egg, and larva which awakes and consumes the hapless insect.

== Popular culture ==
Live cicadas are often collected by climbing trees, a common cause of summertime broken arms. The cicadas can be kept temporarily as pets in shoeboxes, but not easily for longer than a day or two, given that they need flowing sap for food. Highly regarded by schoolchildren, the black prince was valued at "three cherrynoses, four floury bakers, five yellow mondays or a thousand green grocers" by Australian journalist Peter FitzSimons in his childhood. Although they were held by schoolchildren to be rare, black princes were more common along riverbanks rather than suburban areas. Local folklore held that chemists would pay a dollar for the wings. Cicada expert Max Moulds has suggested this may be because Chinese immigrants valued them in Chinese herbal medicine in the 19th century gold rush, perhaps because they resemble the widely used Asian black and scarlet cicada (Huechys sanguinea).
