= Pseudatteria cantharopa =

Scientific classification
- Kingdom: Animalia
- Phylum: Arthropoda
- Class: Insecta
- Order: Lepidoptera
- Family: Tortricidae
- Genus: Pseudatteria
- Species: P. cantharopa

Binomial name
- Pseudatteria cantharopa (Meyrick, 1909)

Synonyms
- Atteria cantharopa Meyrick, 1909

Species of moth

Pseudatteria cantharopa is a species of moth of the family Tortricidae. It is found in Bolivia and Peru.

The length of the forewings is 15–16 mm.

== Subspecies ==
- Pseudatteria cantharopa cantharopa (Bolivia)
- Pseudatteria cantharopa pulchra Obraztsov, 1966 (Peru)
