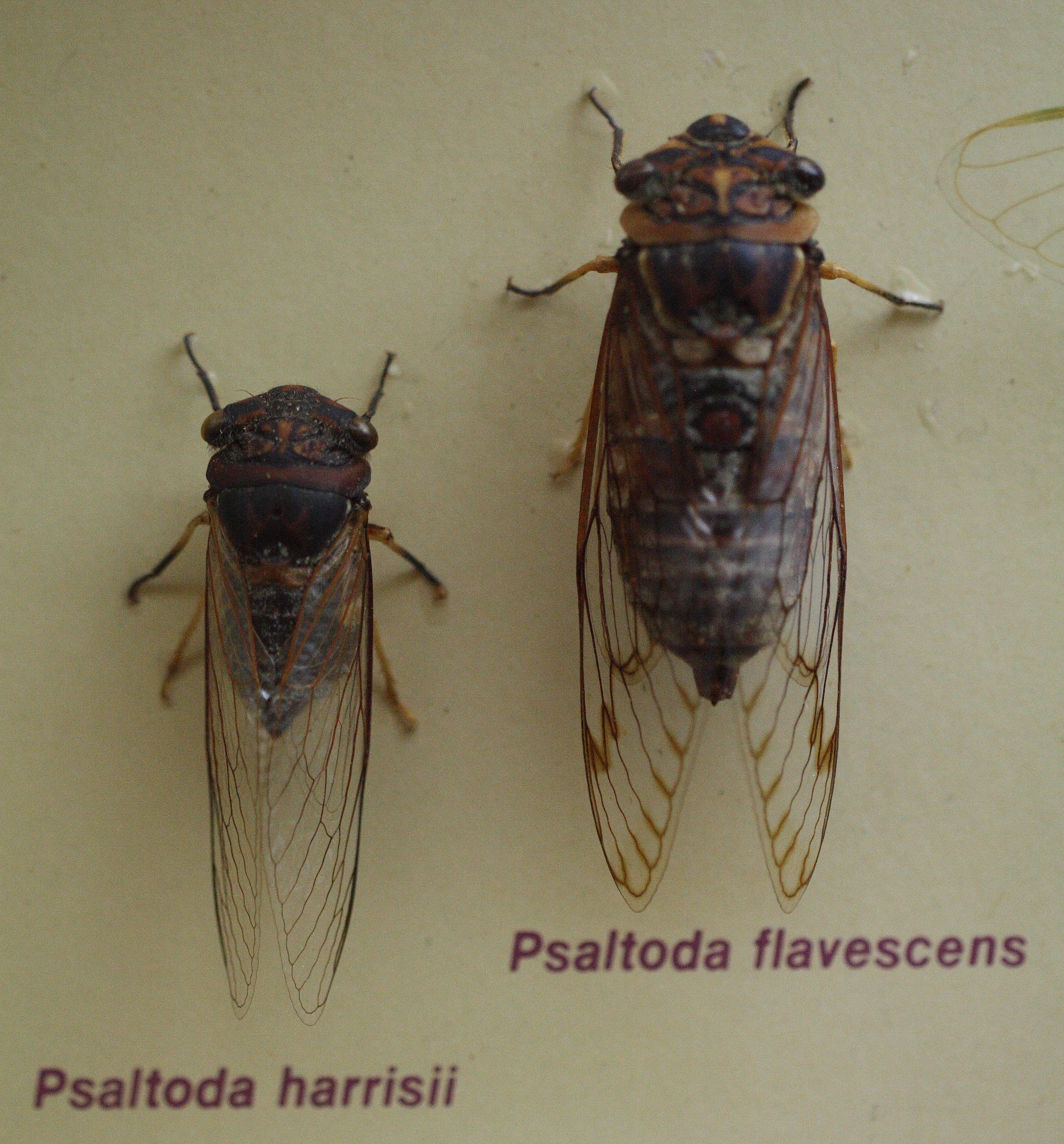
- Psaltoda harrisii and Psaltoda flavescens specimens at the Australian Museum

Scientific classification
- Kingdom: Animalia
- Phylum: Arthropoda
- Class: Insecta
- Order: Hemiptera
- Suborder: Auchenorrhyncha
- Family: Cicadidae
- Tribe: Psaltodini
- Genus: Psaltoda; Stål

= Psaltoda =

Genus of true bugs

Psaltoda is a genus of cicada found in eastern Australia. Originally described by Carl Stål, the type species is Psaltoda moerens known as the redeye, and P. plaga is a well-known species from eastern Australia, known as the black prince. Sixteen species are recognised. Relationships of the species with each other remains unclear.

== Species ==
- Psaltoda adonis Ashton, 1914 - forest demon
- Psaltoda antennetta Moulds, 2002 - clubbed sage
- Psaltoda aurora Distant, 1881 - red roarer
- Psaltoda brachypennis Moss & Moulds, 2000 - phantom knight
- Psaltoda claripennis Ashton, 1921 - clanger
- Psaltoda flavescens Distant, 1892 - golden knight
- Psaltoda fumipennis Ashton, 1912 - smoky sage
- Psaltoda harrisii (Leach, 1814) - yellowbelly
- Psaltoda insularis Ashton, 1914 - Lord Howe cicada
- Psaltoda maccallumi Moulds, 2002 - dark sage
- Psaltoda magnifica Moulds, 1984 - green baron
- Psaltoda moerens (Germar, 1834) - redeye
- Psaltoda mossi, Moulds, 2002 - little baron
- Psaltoda pictibasis (Walker, 1858) - black friday
- Psaltoda plaga (Walker, 1850) - black prince
- Psaltoda seismella Popple & Moulds, 2021
