= Pseudatteria buckleyi =

Scientific classification
- Domain: Eukaryota
- Kingdom: Animalia
- Phylum: Arthropoda
- Class: Insecta
- Order: Lepidoptera
- Family: Tortricidae
- Genus: Pseudatteria
- Species: P. buckleyi

Binomial name
- Pseudatteria buckleyi (H. Druce, 1901)

Synonyms
- Atteria buckleyi H. Druce, 1901; Atteria purpurea Dognin, 1904

Species of moth

Pseudatteria buckleyi is a species of moth of the family Tortricidae first described by Herbert Druce in 1901. It is found in Ecuador.
