= Psaltoda brachypennis =

Scientific classification
- Kingdom: Animalia
- Phylum: Arthropoda
- Clade: Pancrustacea
- Class: Insecta
- Order: Hemiptera
- Suborder: Auchenorrhyncha
- Family: Cicadidae
- Genus: Psaltoda
- Species: P. brachypennis

Binomial name
- Psaltoda brachypennis Moss & Moulds, 2000

Species of cicada

Psaltoda brachypennis, also known as the phantom knight, is a species of cicada in the true cicada family. It is endemic to Australia. It was described in 2000 by entomologists John St Leger Moss and Maxwell Sydney Moulds.

== Description ==
The forewing length is 33–41 mm. Specimens are usually coloured dark green or rich brown.

== Distribution and habitat ==
The species occurs from Herberton in Far North Queensland southwards to Mount Kaputar and Grafton in north-eastern New South Wales, although it has been recorded in the inland region of southern New South Wales. It inhabits both wet and dry sclerophyll forests, brigalow and dry vine thickets

== Behaviour ==
Adults may be heard from mid-November to February, clinging to the upper branches of trees, uttering calls characterised by an initial loud roar followed by a series of soft, rolling pulses.
