= Diduga barlowi =

Scientific classification
- Kingdom: Animalia
- Phylum: Arthropoda
- Clade: Pancrustacea
- Class: Insecta
- Order: Lepidoptera
- Superfamily: Noctuoidea
- Family: Erebidae
- Subfamily: Arctiinae
- Genus: Diduga
- Species: D. barlowi

Binomial name
- Diduga barlowi Holloway, 2001

Species of moth

Diduga barlowi is a moth of the family Erebidae first described by Jeremy Daniel Holloway in 2001. It is found on Borneo. The habitat consists of forested areas in the lowlands.

The length of the forewings is about 4 mm (0.16 in).
