= Diduga ciliata =

Scientific classification
- Kingdom: Animalia
- Phylum: Arthropoda
- Clade: Pancrustacea
- Class: Insecta
- Order: Lepidoptera
- Superfamily: Noctuoidea
- Family: Erebidae
- Subfamily: Arctiinae
- Genus: Diduga
- Species: D. ciliata

Binomial name
- Diduga ciliata Holloway, 2001

Species of moth

Diduga ciliata is a moth of the family Erebidae first described by Jeremy Daniel Holloway in 2001. It is found on Borneo.

The length of the forewings is about 5 mm.
