= Diduga albida =

Scientific classification
- Kingdom: Animalia
- Phylum: Arthropoda
- Class: Insecta
- Order: Lepidoptera
- Superfamily: Noctuoidea
- Family: Erebidae
- Subfamily: Arctiinae
- Genus: Diduga
- Species: D. albida

Binomial name
- Diduga albida Hampson, 1914

Species of moth

Diduga albida is a moth of the family Erebidae first described by George Hampson in 1914. It is found in New Guinea.
