= Psaltoda seismella =

Scientific classification
- Kingdom: Animalia
- Phylum: Arthropoda
- Clade: Pancrustacea
- Class: Insecta
- Order: Hemiptera
- Suborder: Auchenorrhyncha
- Family: Cicadidae
- Genus: Psaltoda
- Species: P. seismella

Binomial name
- Psaltoda seismella Popple & Moulds, 2021

Species of cicada

Psaltoda seismella is a species of cicada in the true cicada family. It is endemic to Australia. It was described in 2021 by Australian entomologists Lindsay Popple and Maxwell Sydney Moulds.

== Etymology ==
The specific epithet seismella is derived from the Greek, meaning ‘little earthquake’, alluding to the shaking quality of the species’ call.

== Distribution and habitat ==
The species occurs in the Wet Tropics of Queensland from south of the Black Mountain Corridor southwards to Townsville. It is restricted to areas of pure rainforest above an elevation of 680 m.
