= Pseudatteria dognini =

Scientific classification
- Domain: Eukaryota
- Kingdom: Animalia
- Phylum: Arthropoda
- Class: Insecta
- Order: Lepidoptera
- Family: Tortricidae
- Genus: Pseudatteria
- Species: P. dognini

Binomial name
- Pseudatteria dognini Obraztsov, 1966

Species of moth

Pseudatteria dognini is a species of moth of the family Tortricidae. It is found in Ecuador.

The length of the forewings is about 14–15 mm. The forewings are orange, but yellowish white in the subcostal and apicoterminal areas. The markings are bluish black. The hindwings are orange with black, with rotundate (rounded) marginal spots.
