= Psaltoda insularis =

Scientific classification
- Kingdom: Animalia
- Phylum: Arthropoda
- Class: Insecta
- Order: Hemiptera
- Suborder: Auchenorrhyncha
- Family: Cicadidae
- Genus: Psaltoda
- Species: P. insularis

Binomial name
- Psaltoda insularis Ashton, 1914

Species of true bug

Psaltoda insularis, commonly known as the Lord Howe Island cicada, is a species of cicada native to Lord Howe Island. It was described by Howard Ashton in 1914.
