= Ceramidia phemonoides =

Scientific classification
- Domain: Eukaryota
- Kingdom: Animalia
- Phylum: Arthropoda
- Class: Insecta
- Order: Lepidoptera
- Superfamily: Noctuoidea
- Family: Erebidae
- Subfamily: Arctiinae
- Genus: Ceramidia
- Species: C. phemonoides

Binomial name
- Ceramidia phemonoides (Möschler, 1854)

Synonyms
- Antichloris phemonoides Möschler, 1878

Species of moth

Ceramidia phemonoides is a moth of the subfamily Arctiinae. It was described by Heinrich Benno Möschler in 1878. It is found in Ecuador and the Amazon region.
