= Diduga annulata =

Scientific classification
- Kingdom: Animalia
- Phylum: Arthropoda
- Class: Insecta
- Order: Lepidoptera
- Superfamily: Noctuoidea
- Family: Erebidae
- Subfamily: Arctiinae
- Genus: Diduga
- Species: D. annulata

Binomial name
- Diduga annulata Hampson, 1900

Species of moth

Diduga annulata is a moth of the subfamily Arctiinae first described by George Hampson in 1900. It is found on Sumbawa and Borneo.

Adults have pale brown wings with dark brown fasciae.
