= Pseudatteria molybdophanes =

Scientific classification
- Domain: Eukaryota
- Kingdom: Animalia
- Phylum: Arthropoda
- Class: Insecta
- Order: Lepidoptera
- Family: Tortricidae
- Genus: Pseudatteria
- Species: P. molybdophanes

Binomial name
- Pseudatteria molybdophanes Razowski & Wojtusiak, 2008

Species of moth

Pseudatteria molybdophanes is a species of moth of the family Tortricidae. It is found in Peru.

The wingspan is about 30 mm.
