= Diduga trichophora =

Scientific classification
- Kingdom: Animalia
- Phylum: Arthropoda
- Class: Insecta
- Order: Lepidoptera
- Superfamily: Noctuoidea
- Family: Erebidae
- Subfamily: Arctiinae
- Genus: Diduga
- Species: D. trichophora

Binomial name
- Diduga trichophora Hampson, 1900

Species of moth

Diduga trichophora is a moth of the family Erebidae first described by George Hampson in 1900. It is found on Bali, Java, Sumatra and Borneo, as well as in southern Myanmar. The habitat consists of lowland forests.
