= Diduga rufidiscalis =

Scientific classification
- Kingdom: Animalia
- Phylum: Arthropoda
- Class: Insecta
- Order: Lepidoptera
- Superfamily: Noctuoidea
- Family: Erebidae
- Subfamily: Arctiinae
- Genus: Diduga
- Species: D. rufidiscalis

Binomial name
- Diduga rufidiscalis Hampson, 1898

Synonyms
- Diduga rufidisca

Species of moth

Diduga rufidiscalis is a moth of the subfamily Arctiinae first described by George Hampson in 1898. It is found in Assam, India.
