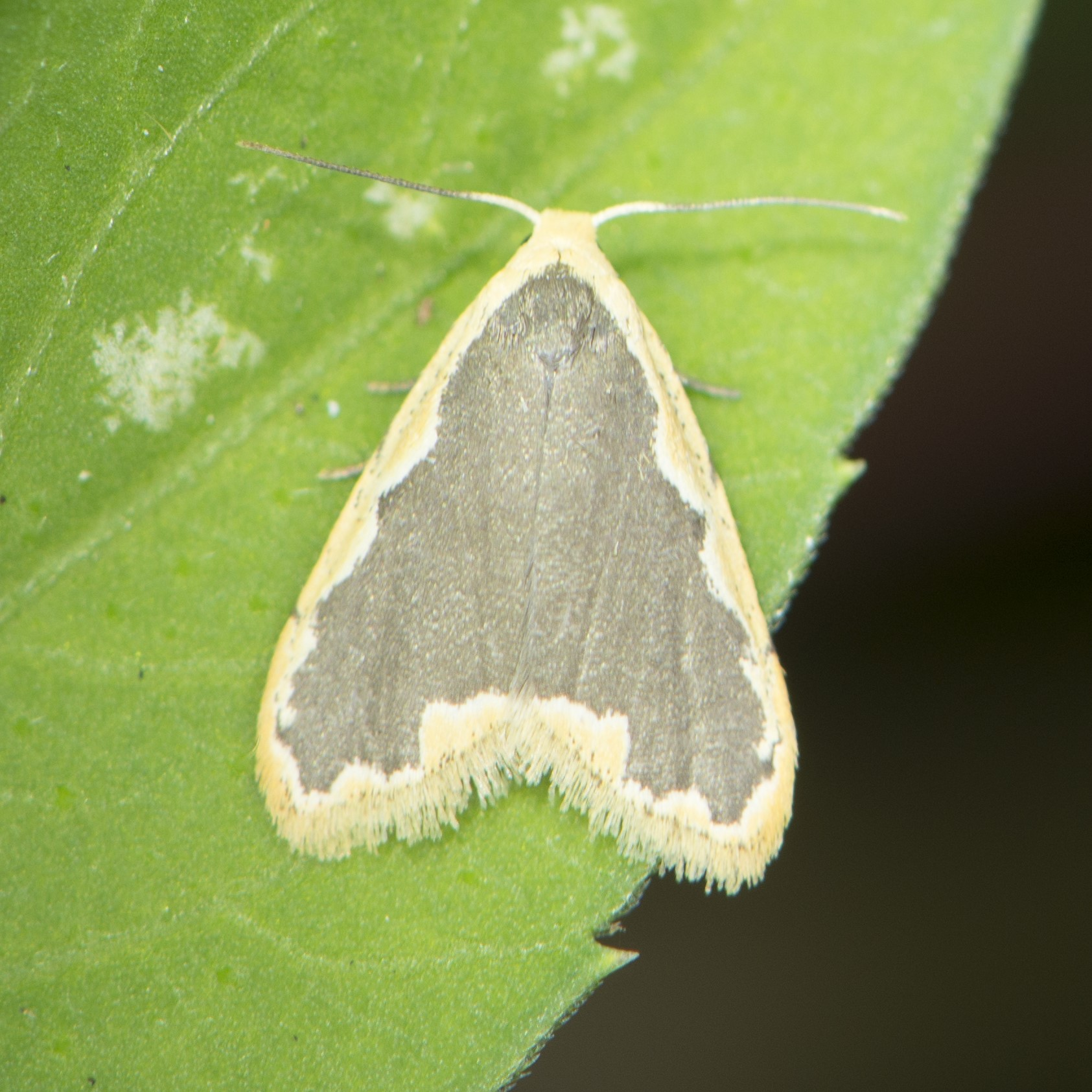

Scientific classification
- Kingdom: Animalia
- Phylum: Arthropoda
- Class: Insecta
- Order: Lepidoptera
- Superfamily: Noctuoidea
- Family: Erebidae
- Subfamily: Arctiinae
- Genus: Diduga
- Species: D. flavicostata

Binomial name
- Diduga flavicostata (Snellen, 1879)

Synonyms
- Pitane flavicostata Snellen, 1879; Diduga fulvicosta Hampson, 1891; Diduga flavicosta Seitz, 1914; Diduga costata Moore, F. 1887

= Diduga flavicostata =

Species of moth

Diduga flavicostata is a species of moth in the family Erebidae first described by Snellen in 1879. It is found on Java, as well as in Australia (the Northern Territory), India, Sri Lanka, Myanmar, Malaysia, China (Jiangxi, Taiwan, Fujian, Guangxi, Hainan, Sichuan, Yunnan) and Japan.

== Description ==
Antennae of male ciliated. Head, collar and tegulae are bright yellowish. Thorax and forewings are dark greyish, where forewings possess bright yellow costal area irrorated with a few black scales. Lower edge is waved. Costa black near the base and black specks on antemedial and postmedial. There is a marginal, bright yellow band with a pale waved inner edge. Cilia orange yellowish. Abdomen and hindwings are paler.
