= Pseudatteria dictyanthes =

Scientific classification
- Kingdom: Animalia
- Phylum: Arthropoda
- Class: Insecta
- Order: Lepidoptera
- Family: Tortricidae
- Genus: Pseudatteria
- Species: P. dictyanthes

Binomial name
- Pseudatteria dictyanthes Meyrick, 1936

Species of moth

Pseudatteria dictyanthes is a species of moth of the family Tortricidae. It is found in Ecuador.
