= Psaltoda maccallumi =

Scientific classification
- Kingdom: Animalia
- Phylum: Arthropoda
- Clade: Pancrustacea
- Class: Insecta
- Order: Hemiptera
- Suborder: Auchenorrhyncha
- Family: Cicadidae
- Genus: Psaltoda
- Species: P. maccallumi

Binomial name
- Psaltoda maccallumi Moulds, 2002

Species of cicada

Psaltoda maccallumi, also known as the dark sage, is a species of cicada in the true cicada family. It is endemic to Australia. It was described in 2002 by entomologist Maxwell Sydney Moulds.

== Description ==
The forewing length is 38–46 mm.

== Distribution and habitat ==
The species is found on the Mount Carbine Tableland in north-eastern Queensland, on Mounts Spurgeon and Lewis, in montane primary rainforest habitats.

== Behaviour ==
Adults may be heard from November to December, clinging to the higher branches of rainforest trees, uttering loud, rich, whining calls followed by a series of slow, purring pulses.
