= Psaltoda antennetta =

Scientific classification
- Kingdom: Animalia
- Phylum: Arthropoda
- Clade: Pancrustacea
- Class: Insecta
- Order: Hemiptera
- Suborder: Auchenorrhyncha
- Family: Cicadidae
- Genus: Psaltoda
- Species: P. antennetta

Binomial name
- Psaltoda antennetta Moulds, 2002

Species of cicada

Psaltoda antennetta, also known as the clubbed sage, is a species of cicada in the true cicada family. It is endemic to Australia. It was described in 2002 by Australian entomologist Maxwell Sydney Moulds.

== Description ==
The forewing length is 38–46 mm.

== Distribution and habitat ==
The species is found in north-eastern Queensland, from south of Cooktown to the southern end of the Paluma Range, in primary tropical rainforest habitats.

== Behaviour ==
Adults may be heard from October to May, sitting high in the forest canopy, uttering harsh, rattling calls followed by an abrupt shriek.
