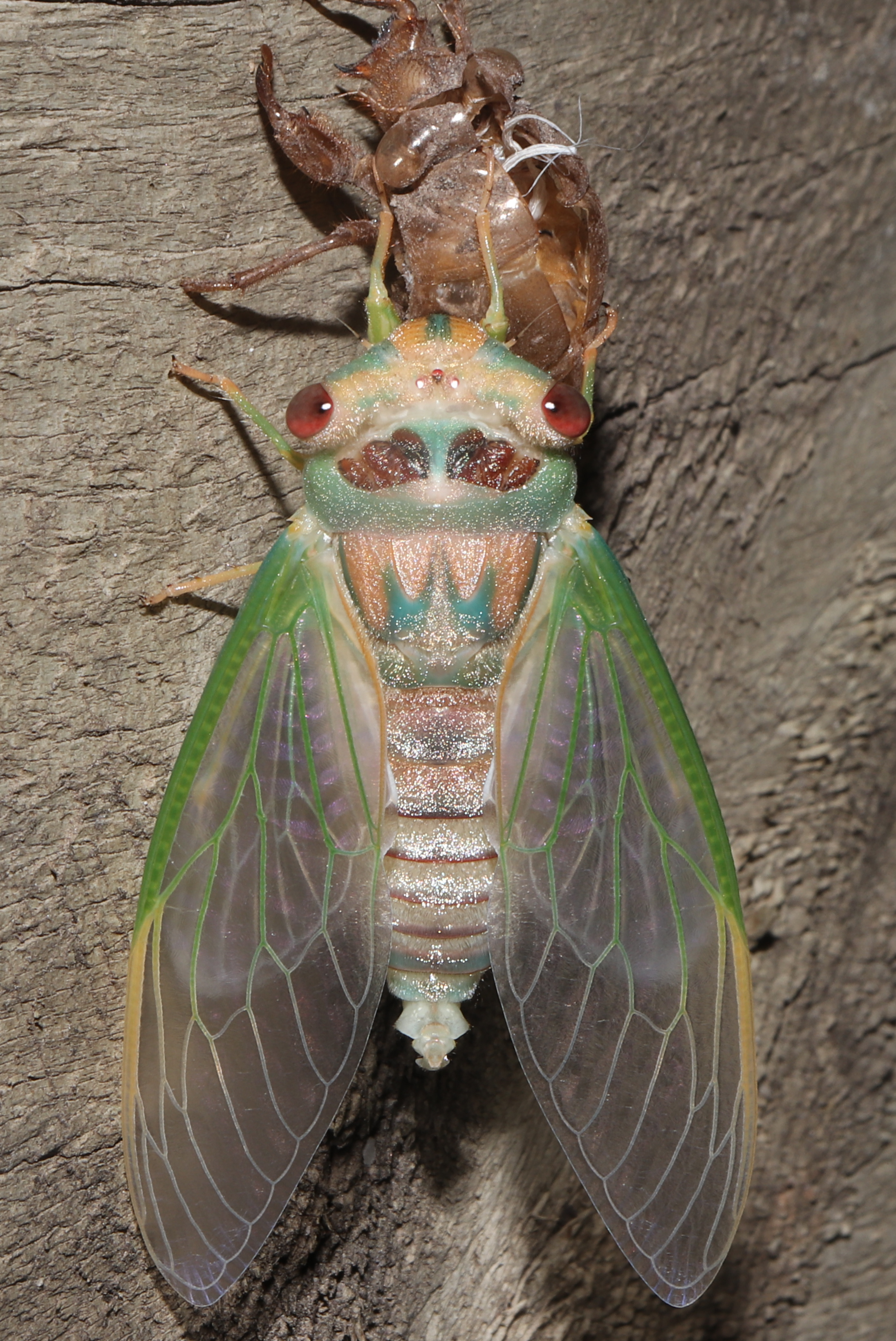

Scientific classification
- Kingdom: Animalia
- Phylum: Arthropoda
- Clade: Pancrustacea
- Class: Insecta
- Order: Hemiptera
- Suborder: Auchenorrhyncha
- Family: Cicadidae
- Genus: Psaltoda
- Species: P. claripennis

Binomial name
- Psaltoda claripennis Ashton, 1921

= Psaltoda claripennis =

Species of cicada

Psaltoda claripennis, also known as the clanger, is a species of cicada in the true cicada family. It is endemic to Australia. It was described in 1921 by Australian entomologist Julian Howard Ashton.

== Description ==
The forewing length is 34–42 mm.

== Distribution and habitat ==
The species occurs in Queensland from the Windsor Tablelands southwards to Tamworth in New South Wales. It inhabits open forest, woodland and gardens, typically on Myrtaceae species such as eucalypts, angophoras and bottlebrushes .

== Behaviour ==
Adults may be heard from October to April, clinging to the upper branches of trees, uttering rattling calls that rise into rapidly pulsating crescendos.
