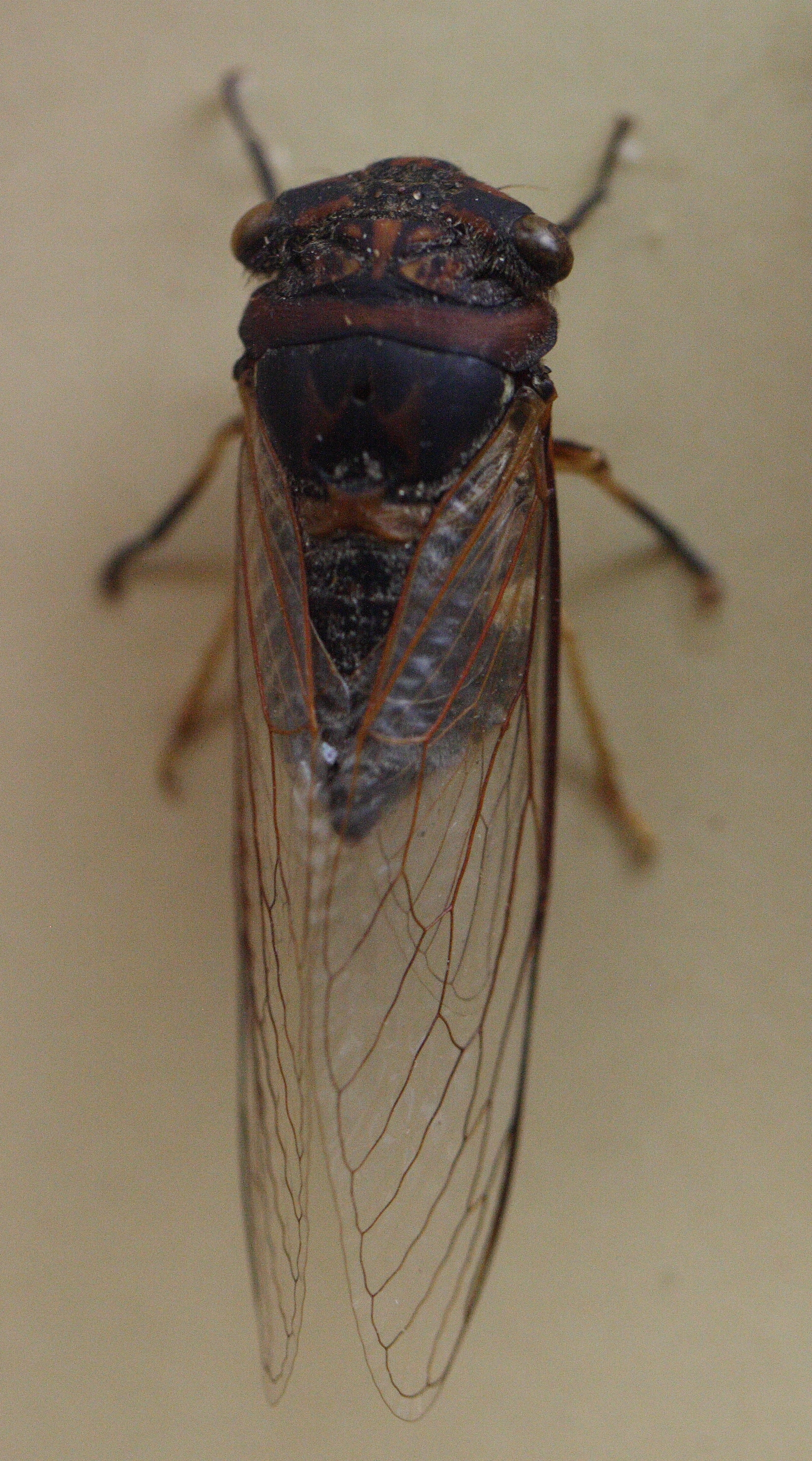
- specimen in the Australian Museum

Scientific classification
- Kingdom: Animalia
- Phylum: Arthropoda
- Class: Insecta
- Order: Hemiptera
- Suborder: Auchenorrhyncha
- Family: Cicadidae
- Genus: Psaltoda
- Species: P. harrisii

Binomial name
- Psaltoda harrisii (Leach), 1814

= Psaltoda harrisii =

Species of true bug

Psaltoda harrisii, commonly known as the yellowbelly, is a species of cicada native to eastern Australia. It can be distinguished from the similar but larger Black prince (Psaltoda plaga), by noting the absence of a dark Z-shaped infuscation near the apex of the forewings, which is present on P. plaga.
