= Diduga albicosta =

Scientific classification
- Kingdom: Animalia
- Phylum: Arthropoda
- Class: Insecta
- Order: Lepidoptera
- Superfamily: Noctuoidea
- Family: Erebidae
- Subfamily: Arctiinae
- Genus: Diduga
- Species: D. albicosta

Binomial name
- Diduga albicosta Hampson, 1891

Synonyms
- Diduga aurantiipicta Seitz, 1914

Species of moth

Diduga albicosta is a moth of the family Erebidae first described by George Hampson in 1891. It is found in India's Nilgiri Mountains, Sri Lanka and on Bali.

== Description ==
Antennae of male bipectinated with short branches. Hindwings with a large patch of modified scales near anal angle. Head, collar, tegula and prothorax are whitish. Mesothorax and metathorax are dull grey. Forewings greyish with a white banded costal area and few dark scales on it. Lower edge is waved. Some white spots found on outer margin, which can be large and conjoined or small, separated. Abdomen and hindwings paler. Hindwings possess a large circular patch of modified scales near anal angle.
