= Pseudatteria marmarantha =

Scientific classification
- Kingdom: Animalia
- Phylum: Arthropoda
- Class: Insecta
- Order: Lepidoptera
- Family: Tortricidae
- Genus: Pseudatteria
- Species: P. marmarantha

Binomial name
- Pseudatteria marmarantha Meyrick, 1924

Species of moth

Pseudatteria marmarantha is a species of moth of the family Tortricidae. It is found in Colombia.
