= Pseudatteria analoga =

Scientific classification
- Domain: Eukaryota
- Kingdom: Animalia
- Phylum: Arthropoda
- Class: Insecta
- Order: Lepidoptera
- Family: Tortricidae
- Genus: Pseudatteria
- Species: P. analoga

Binomial name
- Pseudatteria analoga Obraztsov, 1966

Species of moth

Pseudatteria analoga is a species of moth of the family Tortricidae. It is found in Bolivia.

The length of the forewings is about 13 mm. The forewings are orange yellow with prismatic greenish blue, black-outlined markings. The hindwings are orange yellow with black markings.
