= Pseudatteria heliocausta =

Scientific classification
- Domain: Eukaryota
- Kingdom: Animalia
- Phylum: Arthropoda
- Class: Insecta
- Order: Lepidoptera
- Family: Tortricidae
- Genus: Pseudatteria
- Species: P. heliocausta

Binomial name
- Pseudatteria heliocausta (Dognin, 1912)

Synonyms
- Atteria heliocausta Dognin, 1912; Pseudatteria baccheutis Meyrick, 1924; Pseudatteria fornicata Meyrick, 1917; Pseudatteria metacapna Meyrick, 1924

Species of moth

Pseudatteria heliocausta is a species of moth of the family Tortricidae. It is found in Colombia. The form baccheutis is found in Costa Rica.
