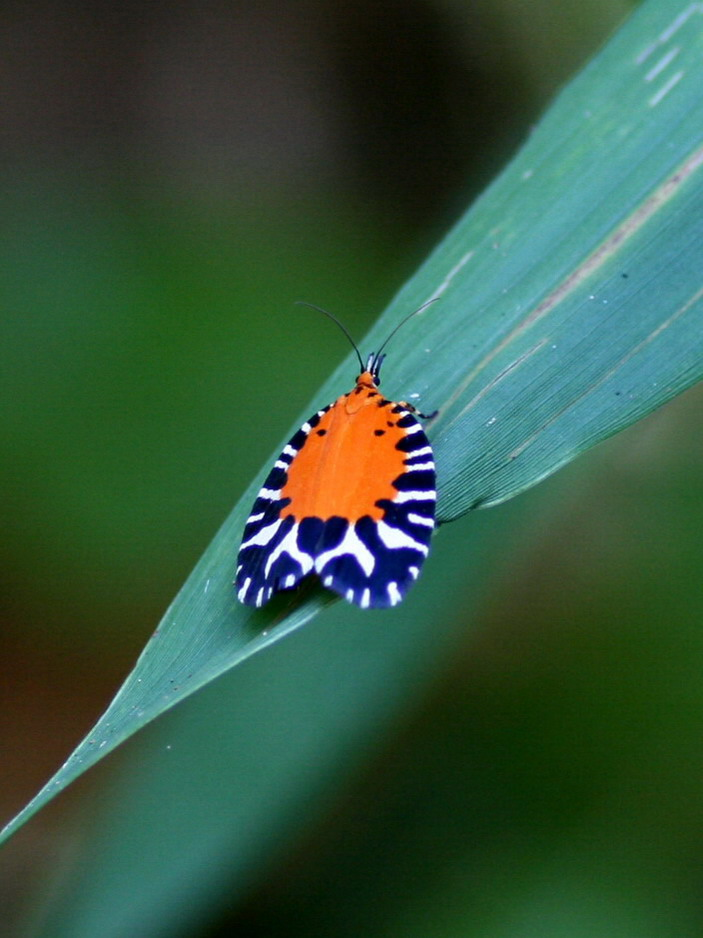
- Pseudatteria ardoris

Scientific classification
- Domain: Eukaryota
- Kingdom: Animalia
- Phylum: Arthropoda
- Class: Insecta
- Order: Lepidoptera
- Family: Tortricidae
- Genus: Pseudatteria
- Species: P. ardoris

Binomial name
- Pseudatteria ardoris Obraztsov, 1966

= Pseudatteria ardoris =

Species of moth

Pseudatteria ardoris is a species of moth of the family Tortricidae. It is found in Peru.

The length of the forewings is about 14 mm. The forewings are deep reddish orange, white at the costa and termen. The markings are black, formed by numerous spots and streaks with a slight bluish or violet luster. The hindwings are concolorous with the forewings but without white.
