= Pseudatteria myriocosma =

Scientific classification
- Kingdom: Animalia
- Phylum: Arthropoda
- Class: Insecta
- Order: Lepidoptera
- Family: Tortricidae
- Genus: Pseudatteria
- Species: P. myriocosma

Binomial name
- Pseudatteria myriocosma Meyrick, 1930

Species of moth

Pseudatteria myriocosma is a species of moth of the family Tortricidae. It is found in Bolivia.
