= Diduga excisa =

Scientific classification
- Kingdom: Animalia
- Phylum: Arthropoda
- Class: Insecta
- Order: Lepidoptera
- Superfamily: Noctuoidea
- Family: Erebidae
- Subfamily: Arctiinae
- Genus: Diduga
- Species: D. excisa

Binomial name
- Diduga excisa Hampson, 1918

Species of moth

Diduga excisa is a moth of the family Erebidae. It is found in the Philippines.
