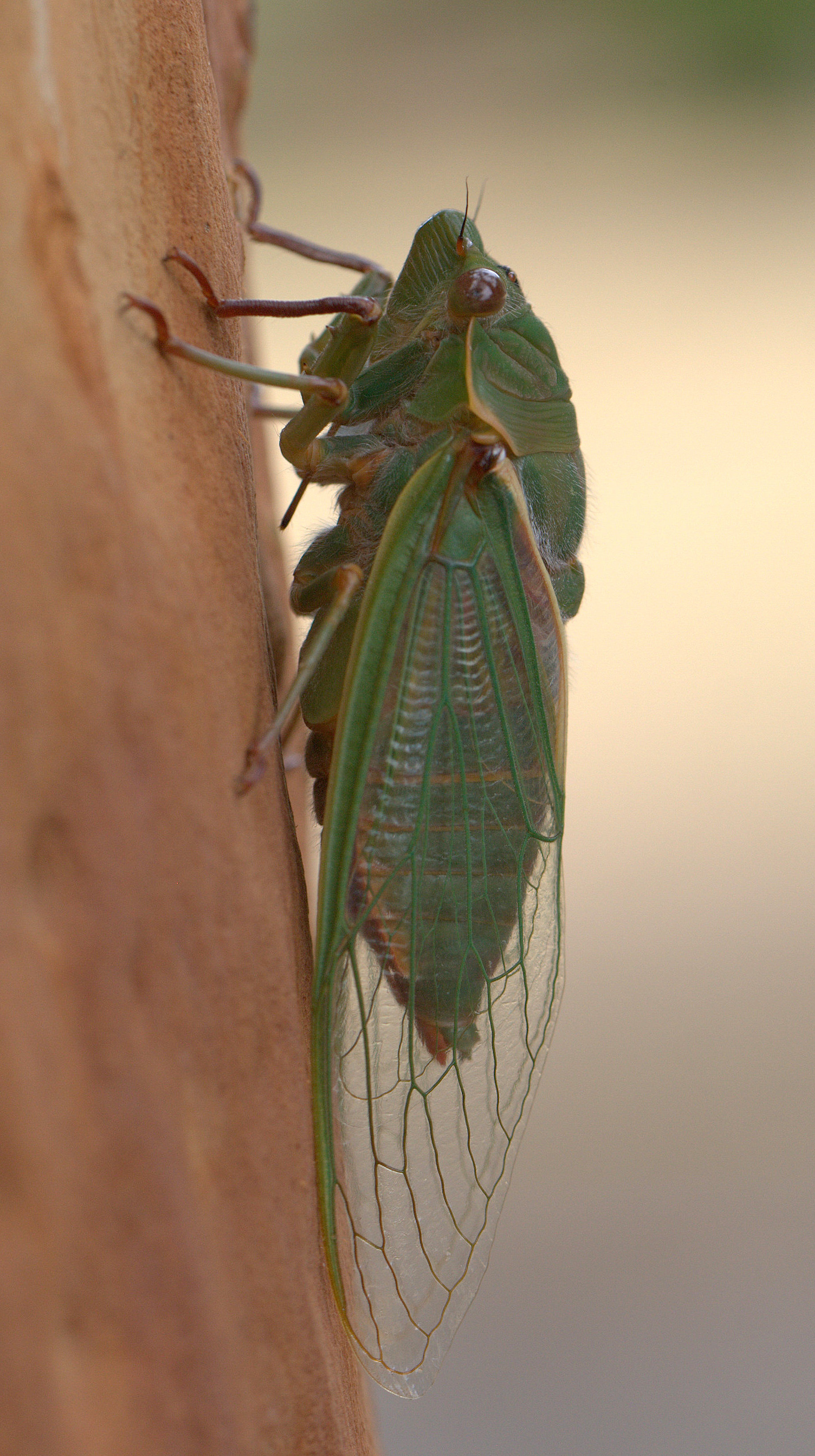
- C. australasiae
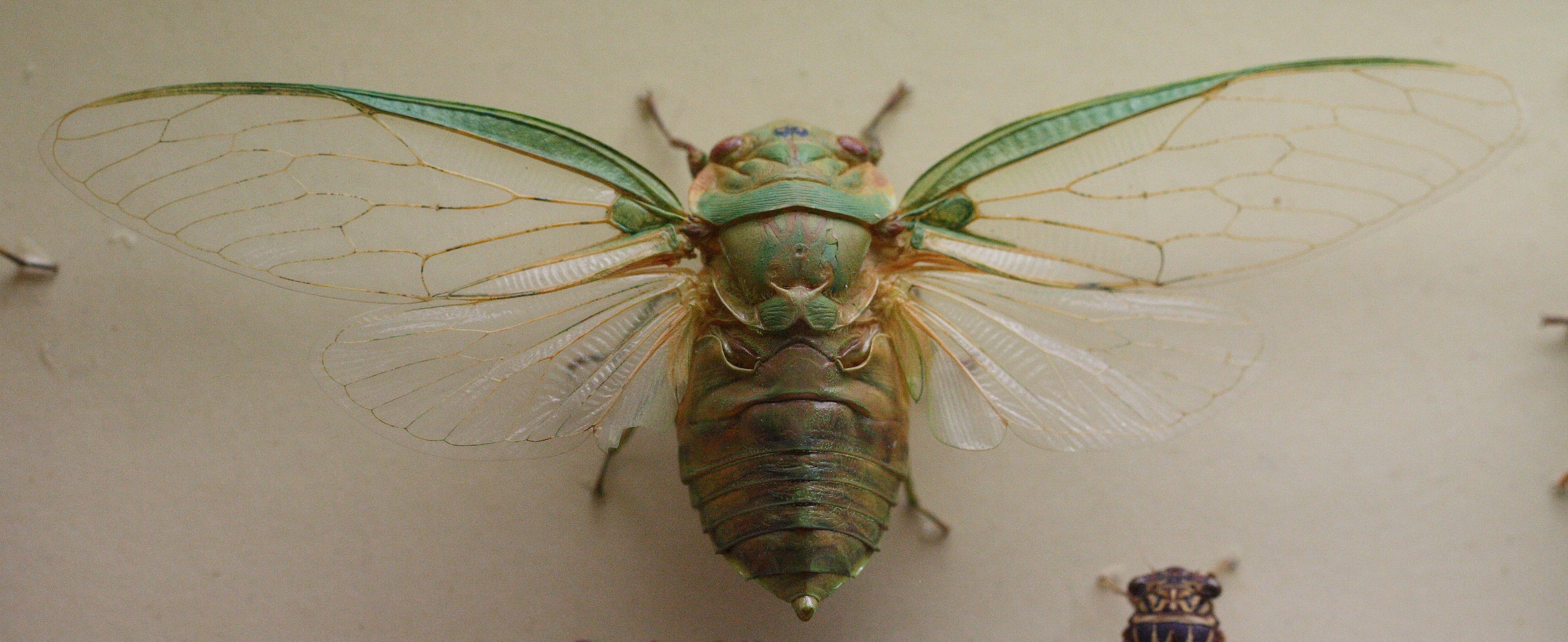
- C. virens

Scientific classification
- Kingdom: Animalia
- Phylum: Arthropoda
- Clade: Pancrustacea
- Class: Insecta
- Order: Hemiptera
- Suborder: Auchenorrhyncha
- Family: Cicadidae
- Subfamily: Cicadinae
- Tribe: Cyclochilini
- Genus: Cyclochila; Amyot & Audinet-Serville, 1843

= Cyclochila =

Genus of true bugs

Cyclochila is a genus of cicada native to eastern Australia. It is the only genus of the tribe Cyclochilini. The cicadas inhabit high-rainfall regions of eastern and south-eastern Australia.

== Species ==
Two species are recognised:

- Cyclochila australasiae (Donovan, 1805) - (Greengrocer, Masked Devil, Yellow Monday)
- Cyclochila virens Distant, 1906 - (Northern Greengrocer)
