= Pseudatteria tremewani =

Scientific classification
- Domain: Eukaryota
- Kingdom: Animalia
- Phylum: Arthropoda
- Class: Insecta
- Order: Lepidoptera
- Family: Tortricidae
- Genus: Pseudatteria
- Species: P. tremewani

Binomial name
- Pseudatteria tremewani Obraztsov, 1966

Species of moth

Pseudatteria tremewani is a species of moth of the family Tortricidae. It is found in Peru.

The length of the forewings is 14–15 mm. The forewings are deep reddish orange, but white in the subcostal and apicoterminal areas. The markings are black. The hindwings are reddish orange with black spots.
