= Pseudatteria pseudomaenas =

Scientific classification
- Domain: Eukaryota
- Kingdom: Animalia
- Phylum: Arthropoda
- Class: Insecta
- Order: Lepidoptera
- Family: Tortricidae
- Genus: Pseudatteria
- Species: P. pseudomaenas

Binomial name
- Pseudatteria pseudomaenas Obraztsov, 1966

Species of moth

Pseudatteria pseudomaenas is a species of moth of the family Tortricidae. It is found in Costa Rica.

The length of the forewings is about 11 mm for males and 14 mm for females. The forewings are orange, but cream white in the costal and apicoterminal areas. The markings are black. The hindwings are orange with nine black spots on the margins.
