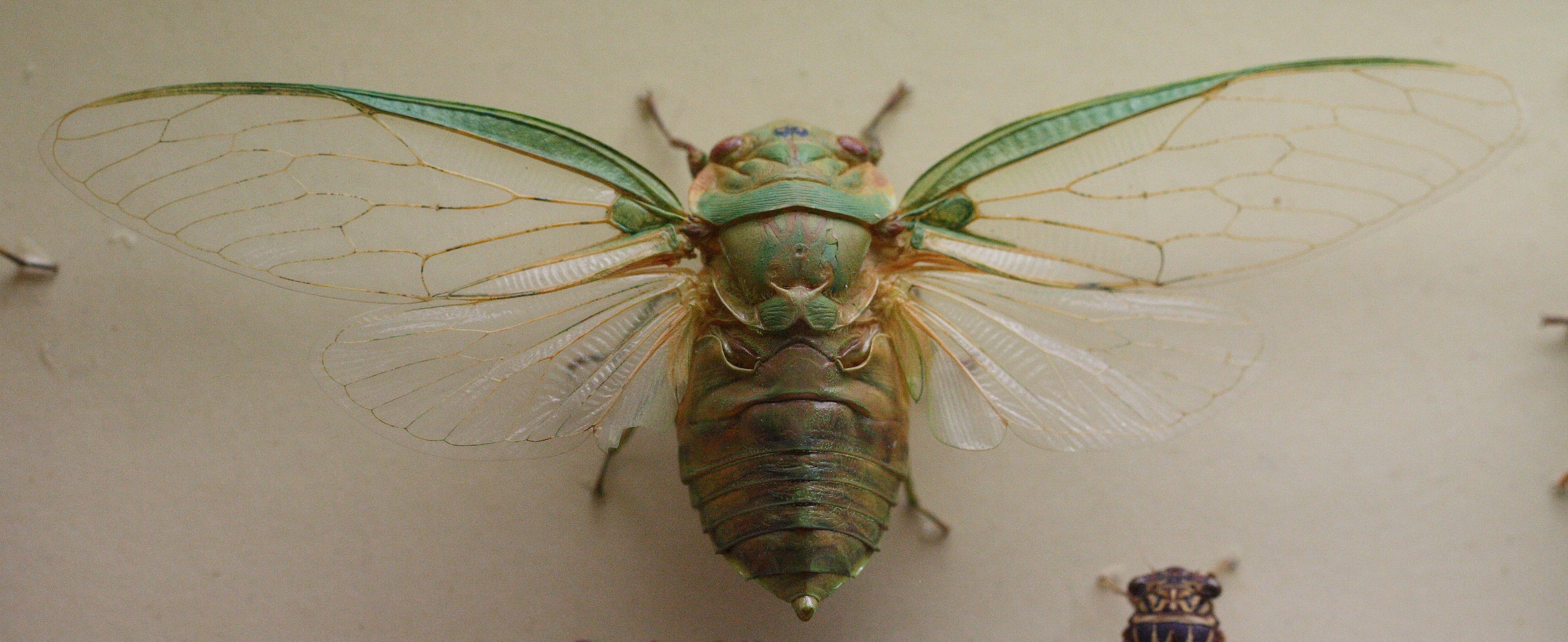
- Specimen in the Australian Museum

Scientific classification
- Kingdom: Animalia
- Phylum: Arthropoda
- Clade: Pancrustacea
- Class: Insecta
- Order: Hemiptera
- Suborder: Auchenorrhyncha
- Family: Cicadidae
- Genus: Cyclochila
- Species: C. virens

Binomial name
- Cyclochila virens Distant, 1906

= Cyclochila virens =

Species of true bug

Cyclochila virens, commonly known as the northern greengrocer, is a species of cicada native to northeastern Queensland.
