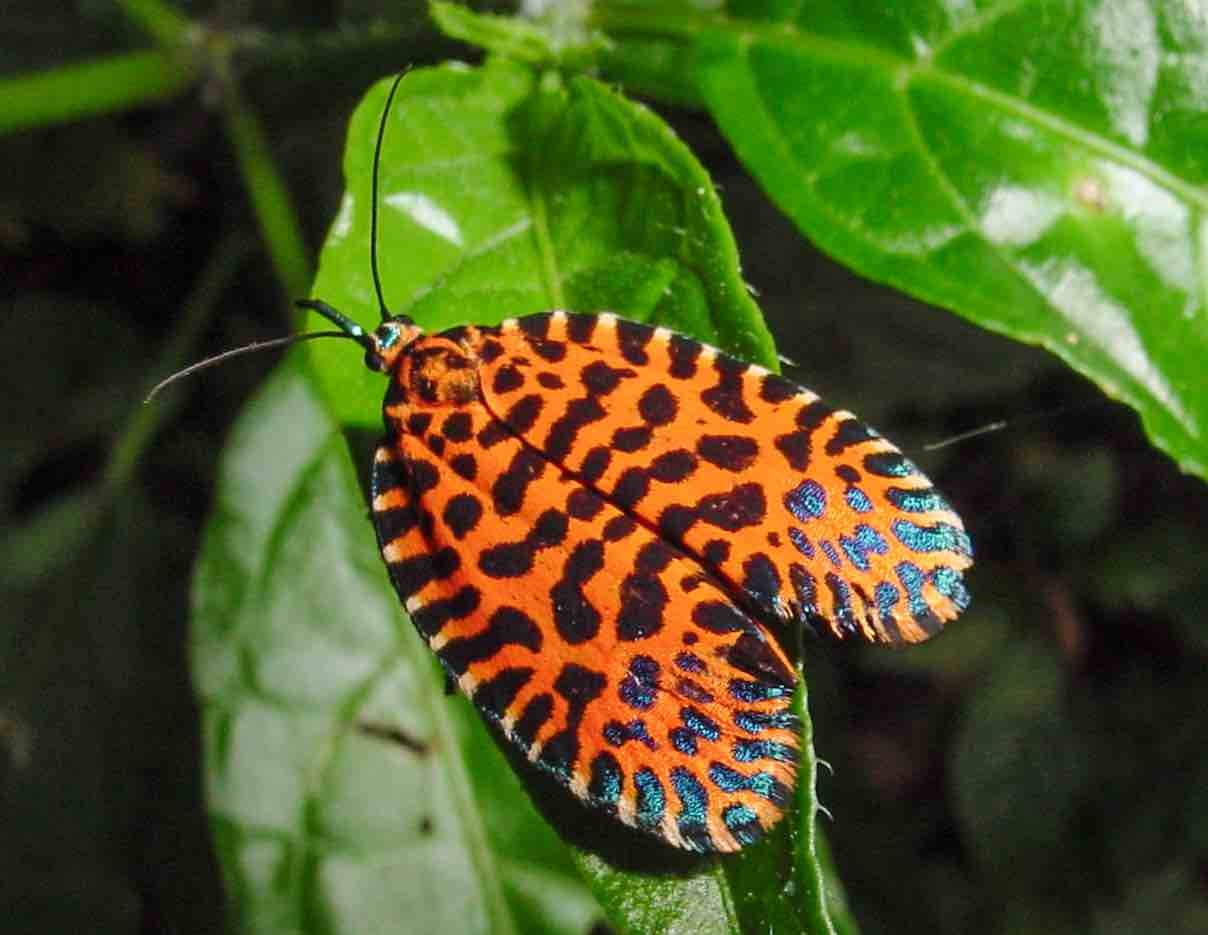

Scientific classification
- Domain: Eukaryota
- Kingdom: Animalia
- Phylum: Arthropoda
- Class: Insecta
- Order: Lepidoptera
- Family: Tortricidae
- Genus: Pseudatteria
- Species: P. leopardina

Binomial name
- Pseudatteria leopardina (Butler, 1872)

Synonyms
- Atteria leopardina Butler, 1872

= Pseudatteria leopardina =

Species of moth

Pseudatteria leopardina is a species of moth of the family Tortricidae. It is found in Costa Rica and Panama.
