= Pseudatteria chrysanthema =

Scientific classification
- Kingdom: Animalia
- Phylum: Arthropoda
- Class: Insecta
- Order: Lepidoptera
- Family: Tortricidae
- Genus: Pseudatteria
- Species: P. chrysanthema

Binomial name
- Pseudatteria chrysanthema (Meyrick, 1912)

Synonyms
- Atteria chrysanthema Meyrick, 1912

Species of moth

Pseudatteria chrysanthema is a species of moth of the family Tortricidae. It is found in Colombia, Guyana, Venezuela, Ecuador, Bolivia and Brazil.
