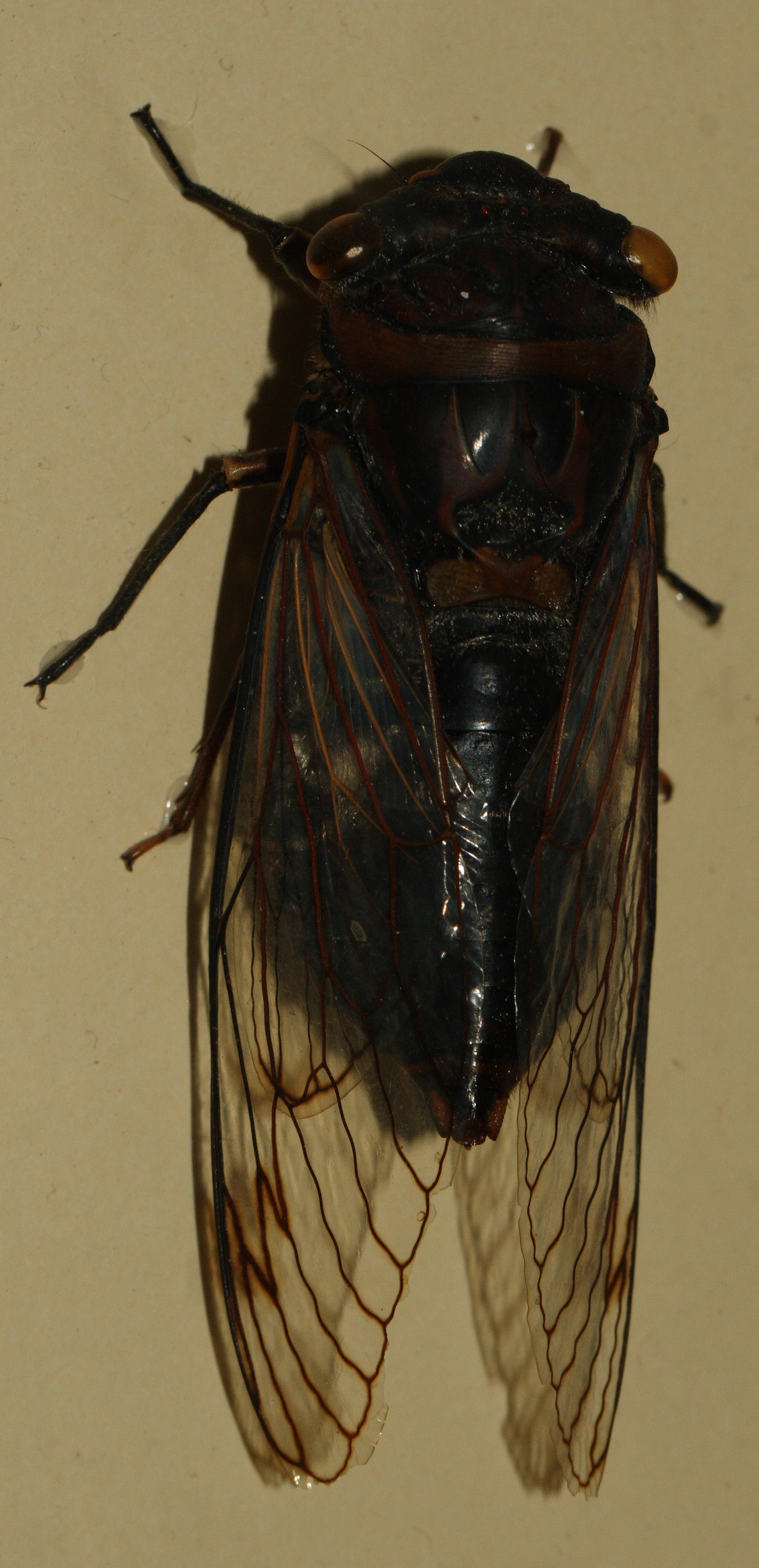
- specimen in the Australian Museum

Scientific classification
- Kingdom: Animalia
- Phylum: Arthropoda
- Class: Insecta
- Order: Hemiptera
- Suborder: Auchenorrhyncha
- Family: Cicadidae
- Genus: Psaltoda
- Species: P. pictibasis

Binomial name
- Psaltoda pictibasis (Walker), 1858

= Psaltoda pictibasis =

Species of true bug

Psaltoda pictibasis, commonly known as the black friday, is a species of cicada native to Queensland and northeastern New South Wales in eastern Australia.
