= Pseudatteria symplacota =

Scientific classification
- Kingdom: Animalia
- Phylum: Arthropoda
- Class: Insecta
- Order: Lepidoptera
- Family: Tortricidae
- Genus: Pseudatteria
- Species: P. symplacota

Binomial name
- Pseudatteria symplacota Meyrick, 1930

Synonyms
- Pseudatteria anemonantha Meyrick, 1932

Species of moth

Pseudatteria symplacota is a species of moth of the family Tortricidae. It is found in Ecuador and Peru.

The species varies in the size and shape of the marginal spots of the forewings. The number and size of the discoidal spots are inconstant. On the hindwings of the females, only the terminal and subterminal spots are present. The males also have some additional spots and oblique streaks in the discoidal area.
