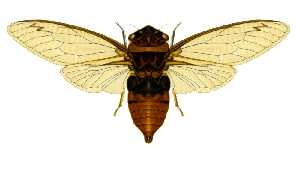

Scientific classification
- Kingdom: Animalia
- Phylum: Arthropoda
- Clade: Pancrustacea
- Class: Insecta
- Order: Hemiptera
- Suborder: Auchenorrhyncha
- Family: Cicadidae
- Genus: Psaltoda
- Species: P. aurora

Binomial name
- Psaltoda aurora Distant, 1881

= Psaltoda aurora =

Species of cicada

Psaltoda aurora, also known as the red roarer, is a species of cicada in the true cicada family. It is endemic to Australia. It was described in 1881 by English entomologist William Lucas Distant.

== Description ==
The forewing length is 50–62 mm.

== Distribution and habitat ==
The species occurs in Queensland from the Windsor Tablelands to the west of Paluma, and southwards to Rockhampton and the Dawson River. It inhabits dry sclerophyll forest, as well as eucalypts growing on the margins of rainforest and along the edges of rivers.

== Behaviour ==
Adults may be heard from mid-November to February, clinging to the trunks and upper branches of eucalypts, uttering calls characterised by a low, rumbling growl, rising in pitch into a slow, harsh yodelling sequence.
