= Pseudatteria bradleyi =

Scientific classification
- Domain: Eukaryota
- Kingdom: Animalia
- Phylum: Arthropoda
- Class: Insecta
- Order: Lepidoptera
- Family: Tortricidae
- Genus: Pseudatteria
- Species: P. bradleyi

Binomial name
- Pseudatteria bradleyi Obraztsov, 1966

Species of moth

Pseudatteria bradleyi is a species of moth of the family Tortricidae. It is found in Bolivia.

The length of the forewings is about 14 mm. The forewings are deep reddish orange, but cream white in the subcostal area and the external third of the wing. The markings are blue-black. The hindwings are deep reddish orange with violet-black marginal spots.

== Etymology ==
The species is named for J. D. Bradley of the British Museum.
