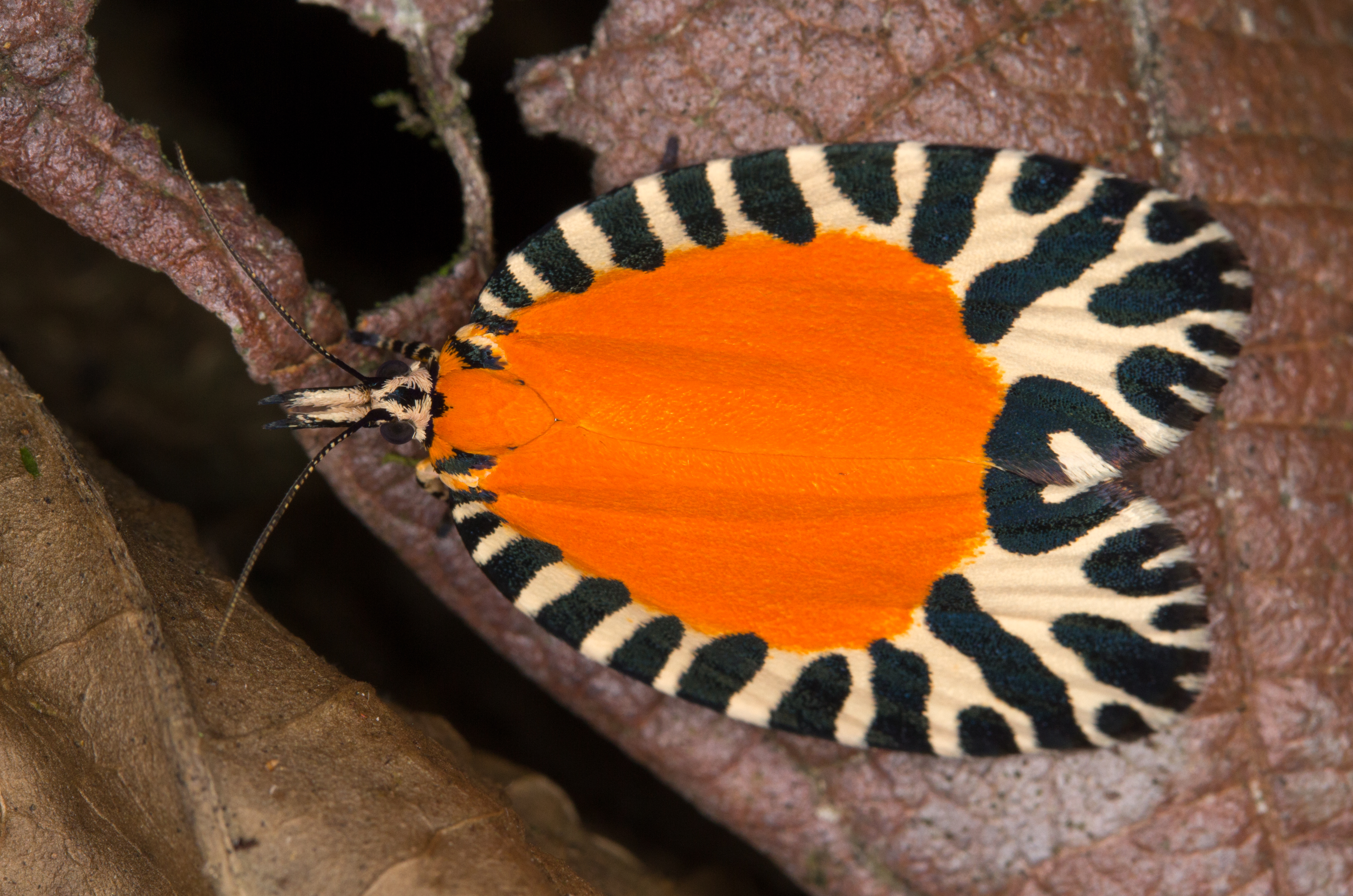

Scientific classification
- Domain: Eukaryota
- Kingdom: Animalia
- Phylum: Arthropoda
- Class: Insecta
- Order: Lepidoptera
- Family: Tortricidae
- Genus: Pseudatteria
- Species: P. volcanica

Binomial name
- Pseudatteria volcanica (Butler, 1872)

Synonyms
- Atteria volcanica Butler, 1872; Pseudatteria geminipuncta Walsingham, 1914; Atteria mimica Felder & Rogenhofer, 1875; Pseudatteria potamites Walsingham, 1913; Atteria rivularis Butler, 1875

= Pseudatteria volcanica =

Species of moth

Pseudatteria volcanica is a species of moth of the family Tortricidae. It is found in Mexico, Panama, Costa Rica, Colombia and Peru.
