= Diduga dorsolobata =

Scientific classification
- Kingdom: Animalia
- Phylum: Arthropoda
- Clade: Pancrustacea
- Class: Insecta
- Order: Lepidoptera
- Superfamily: Noctuoidea
- Family: Erebidae
- Subfamily: Arctiinae
- Genus: Diduga
- Species: D. dorsolobata

Binomial name
- Diduga dorsolobata Holloway, 2001

Species of moth

Diduga dorsolobata is a moth of the family Erebidae first described by Jeremy Daniel Holloway in 2001. It is found on the island of Borneo. The type specimen was found in lowland forest in Poring in the Malaysian state of Sabah at an altitude of around 600 m (2,000 ft).

The length of the forewings is about 9 mm (0.4 in).
