= Pseudatteria shafferi =

Scientific classification
- Domain: Eukaryota
- Kingdom: Animalia
- Phylum: Arthropoda
- Class: Insecta
- Order: Lepidoptera
- Family: Tortricidae
- Genus: Pseudatteria
- Species: P. shafferi

Binomial name
- Pseudatteria shafferi Obraztsov, 1966

Species of moth

Pseudatteria shafferi is a species of moth of the family Tortricidae. It is found in Colombia.

The length of the forewings is about 14 mm. The forewings are orange, but white in subcostal and apicoterminal areas. The markings are bluish black. The hindwings are orange with purple-black spots.
