= Pseudatteria cladodes =

Scientific classification
- Domain: Eukaryota
- Kingdom: Animalia
- Phylum: Arthropoda
- Class: Insecta
- Order: Lepidoptera
- Family: Tortricidae
- Genus: Pseudatteria
- Species: P. cladodes

Binomial name
- Pseudatteria cladodes Walsingham, 1914

Species of moth

Pseudatteria cladodes is a species of moth of the family Tortricidae. It is found in Peru, Colombia and possibly Central America.
