= Diduga plumosa =

Scientific classification
- Domain: Eukaryota
- Kingdom: Animalia
- Phylum: Arthropoda
- Class: Insecta
- Order: Lepidoptera
- Superfamily: Noctuoidea
- Family: Erebidae
- Subfamily: Arctiinae
- Genus: Diduga
- Species: D. plumosa

Binomial name
- Diduga plumosa Hampson, 1911

Species of moth

Diduga plumosa is a moth of the family Erebidae. It is found on Sumbawa.
