= Ceramidia =

Scientific classification
- Domain: Eukaryota
- Kingdom: Animalia
- Phylum: Arthropoda
- Class: Insecta
- Order: Lepidoptera
- Superfamily: Noctuoidea
- Family: Erebidae
- Subfamily: Arctiinae
- Subtribe: Ctenuchina
- Genus: Ceramidia; Butler, 1876

Synonyms
- Passineura Butler, 1876

Genus of moths

Ceramidia is a genus of moths in the subfamily Arctiinae. The genus was erected by Arthur Gardiner Butler in 1876.

== Species ==
- Ceramidia fumipennis Walker, 1854
- Ceramidia phemonoides Möschler, 1854
