= Pseudatteria splendens =

Scientific classification
- Domain: Eukaryota
- Kingdom: Animalia
- Phylum: Arthropoda
- Class: Insecta
- Order: Lepidoptera
- Family: Tortricidae
- Genus: Pseudatteria
- Species: P. splendens

Binomial name
- Pseudatteria splendens (H. Druce, 1901)

Synonyms
- Atteria splendens H. Druce, 1901; Atteria flabellata Meyrick, 1912

Species of moth

Pseudatteria splendens is a species of moth of the family Tortricidae first described by Herbert Druce in 1901. It is found in Ecuador, Colombia, Peru and Brazil.

It is a variable species, varying in some elements of the wing pattern, as well as in the reduction and/or division into smaller portions. The most constant external character consists of two costal streaks in the outer half of the forewing.
