= Pseudatteria pantherina =

Scientific classification
- Domain: Eukaryota
- Kingdom: Animalia
- Phylum: Arthropoda
- Class: Insecta
- Order: Lepidoptera
- Family: Tortricidae
- Genus: Pseudatteria
- Species: P. pantherina

Binomial name
- Pseudatteria pantherina (Felder & Rogenhofer, 1875)

Synonyms
- Atteria pantherina Felder & Rogenhofer, 1875

Species of moth

Pseudatteria pantherina is a species of moth of the family Tortricidae. It is found in Colombia.
