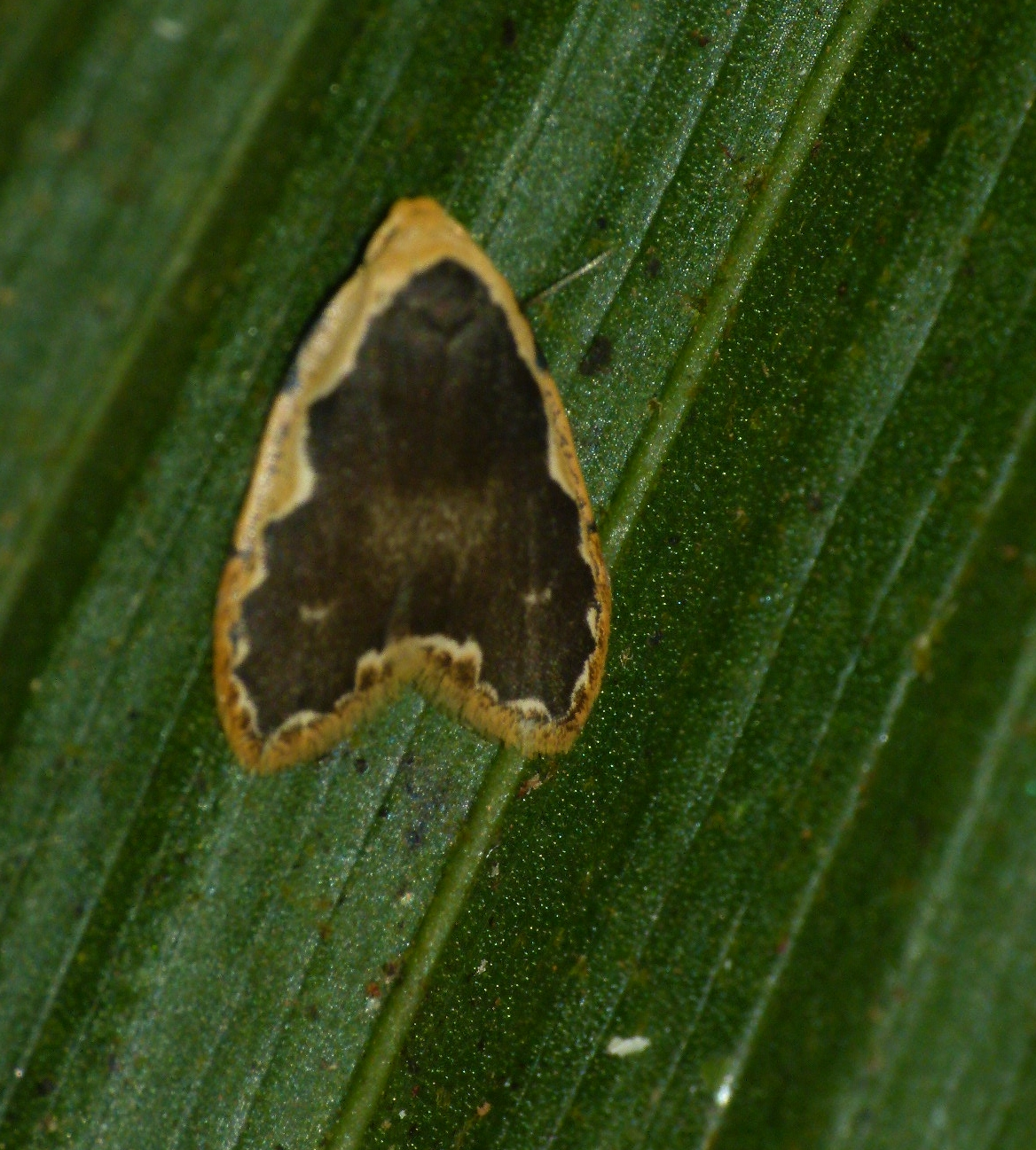
- A species from the Western Ghats of India

Scientific classification
- Kingdom: Animalia
- Phylum: Arthropoda
- Class: Insecta
- Order: Lepidoptera
- Superfamily: Noctuoidea
- Family: Erebidae
- Subfamily: Arctiinae
- Tribe: Lithosiini
- Genus: Diduga; Moore, [1877]

Synonyms
- Androstigma Hampson, 1893

= Diduga =

Genus of moths

Diduga is a genus of moths in the family Erebidae.

== Description ==
Palpi slender and obliquely porrect. Tibia with long spurs. Forewings with vein 3 arise from before angle of cell. Veins 4 and 5 from angle, vein 6 from upper angle and veins 7 and 8 are stalked. Hindwings with vein 4 from angle of cell, vein 5 from above angle, vein 3 absent and veins 6 and 7 are stalked. Forewings of male possess a costal fold acting like the retinaculum.

== Species ==
- Diduga albicosta
- Diduga albida
- Diduga annulata
- Diduga barlowi
- Diduga ciliata
- Diduga dorsolobata
- Diduga excisa
- Diduga flavicostata
- Diduga fumipennis
- Diduga haematomiformis
- Diduga metaleuca
- Diduga pectinifer
- Diduga plumosa
- Diduga rufidiscalis
- Diduga trichophora
