= Pseudatteria =

Scientific classification
- Domain: Eukaryota
- Kingdom: Animalia
- Phylum: Arthropoda
- Class: Insecta
- Order: Lepidoptera
- Family: Tortricidae
- Subfamily: Chlidanotinae
- Genus: Pseudatteria; Walsingham, 1913

Species
- See text

Synonyms
- Eurynatteria Obraztsov, 1966; Pseudatteria Meyrick, 1912; Sphaeratteria Obraztsov, 1966

Genus of tortrix moths

Pseudatteria is a genus of moths belonging to the family Tortricidae.

== Species ==
- Pseudatteria analoga Obraztsov, 1966
- Pseudatteria ardoris Obraztsov, 1966
- Pseudatteria bradleyi Obraztsov, 1966
- Pseudatteria buckleyi Druce, 1901
- Pseudatteria cantharopa Meyrick, 1909
- Pseudatteria chrysanthema Meyrick, 1912
- Pseudatteria cladodes Walsingham, 1914
- Pseudatteria dictyanthes Meyrick, 1936
- Pseudatteria dognini Obraztsov, 1966
- Pseudatteria fumipennis Dognin, 1904
- Pseudatteria heliocausta Dognin, 1912
- Pseudatteria igniflora Meyrick, 1930
- Pseudatteria leopardina Butler, 1872
- Pseudatteria maenas Meyrick, 1924
- Pseudatteria marmarantha Meyrick, 1924
- Pseudatteria molybdophanes Razowski & Wojtusiak, 2008
- Pseudatteria myriocosma Meyrick, 1930
- Pseudatteria pantherina Felder & Rogenhofer, 1875
- Pseudatteria pseudomaenas Obraztsov, 1966
- Pseudatteria shafferi Obraztsov, 1966
- Pseudatteria splendens Druce, 1901
- Pseudatteria symplacota Meyrick, 1930
- Pseudatteria tremewani Obraztsov, 1966
- Pseudatteria unicana Dognin, 1904
- Pseudatteria volcanica Butler, 1872
