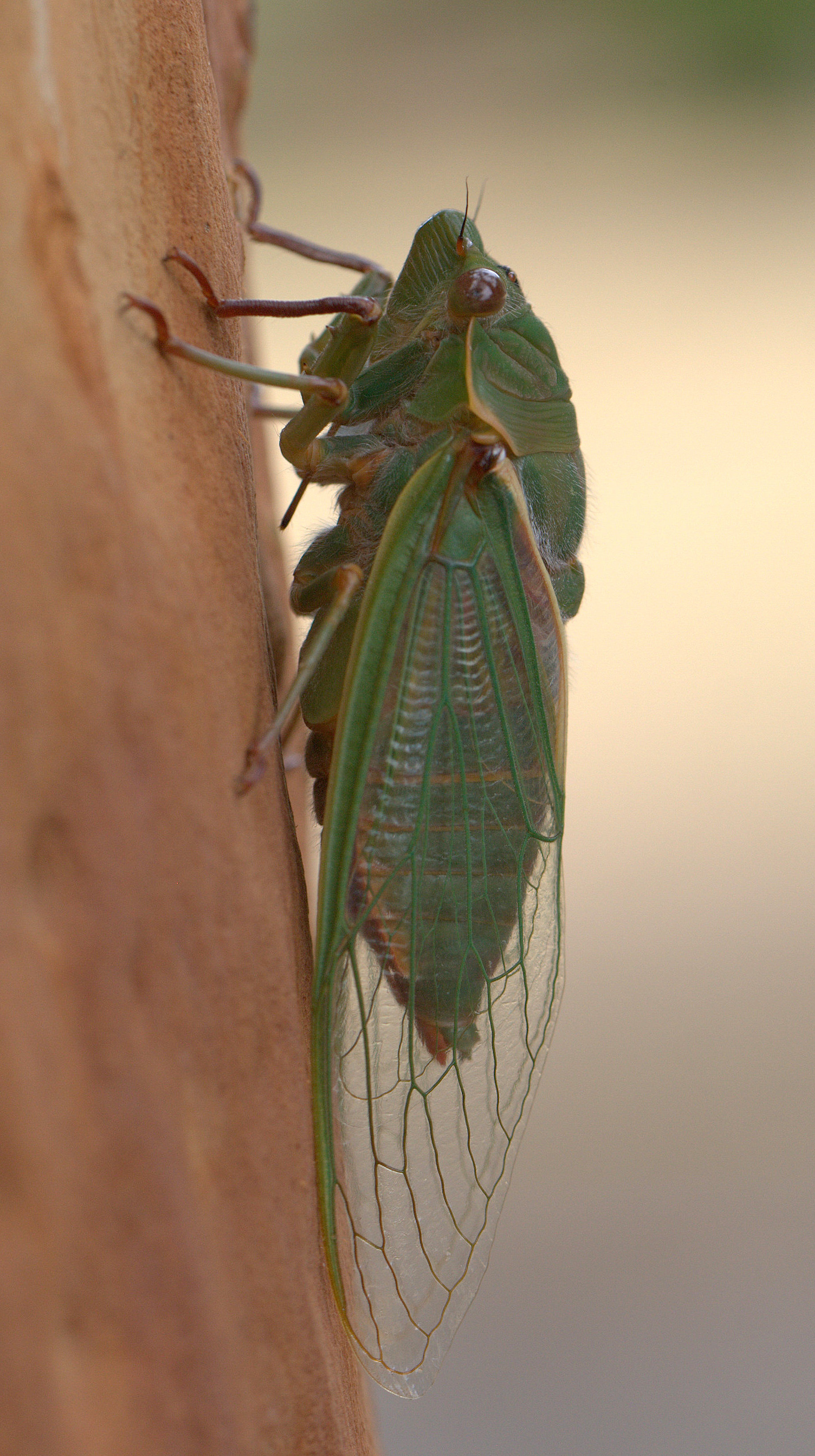

Scientific classification
- Kingdom: Animalia
- Phylum: Arthropoda
- Class: Insecta
- Order: Hemiptera
- Suborder: Auchenorrhyncha
- Family: Cicadidae
- Genus: Cyclochila
- Species: C. australasiae

Binomial name
- Cyclochila australasiae (Donovan, 1805)

Synonyms
- Tettigonia australasiae Donovan; Cicada olivacea Germar

= Cyclochila australasiae =

Species of true bug

Cyclochila australasiae is a species of cicada and one of Australia's most familiar insects. It is distributed through coastal regions of southeastern Australia. Green specimens are commonly known as green grocers and yellow ones as yellow mondays.

It is one of the loudest insects in the world.

== Taxonomy ==
Cyclochila australasiae was first described as Tettigonia australasiae in 1805 by amateur zoologist Edward Donovan, who reported that it was common in New South Wales and many specimens had been collected and sent to England. Ernst Friedrich Germar named it Cicada olivacea in 1830. It was the second Australian species of cicada described after the double drummer (Thopha saccata).

It was formerly commonly known as the Great Green Cicada; in addition, the various colour forms have different vernacular names, including Yellow Monday for a common yellow morph; Chocolate Soldier for a rare dark tan form; Blue Moon for a rare turquoise form; and Masked Devil for its red-orange form. The names for the green and yellow forms have been recorded since at least 1896. Australian entomologist Walter Wilson Froggatt reported that the green form was known as green Monday (alongside yellow Monday for the yellow form) in his 1907 work Australian Insects.

== Description ==
Cyclochila australasiae measures about 4 cm (1.6 in) in length, with a wingspan of 11–13 cm (4.3–5.1 in). Diverse colour forms are seen, the most common being predominantly green or brownish yellow. It has red eyes. The exuvia, or discarded empty exoskeleton of the nymph form, is commonly seen on tree trunks in gardens and bushland during the summer months.

The loud calls of the male are heard over the summer months; harsh and high-pitched, these may reach 120 decibels. The sound is made by the rapid buckling of the timbal ribs, and amplified by resonation in an air sac; the frequency is around 4.3 kHz. Calls occur in the afternoon and dusk of warm days.

== Distribution and habitat ==
Cyclochila australasiae is found from Kroombit Tops in southeastern Queensland through eastern New South Wales and Victoria to the Grampians, and through to Mount Gambier in southeastern South Australia. It is common along the Great Dividing Range, and is also found in the Warrumbungles. It is commonly seen (and heard) around Sydney and Melbourne, the Blue Mountains and Gippsland. In Brisbane, it is only encountered at elevations above 300 m (1000 ft). It was associated with the white stringybark (Eucalyptus globoidea) in a study at three sites in western Sydney.

== Life cycle ==
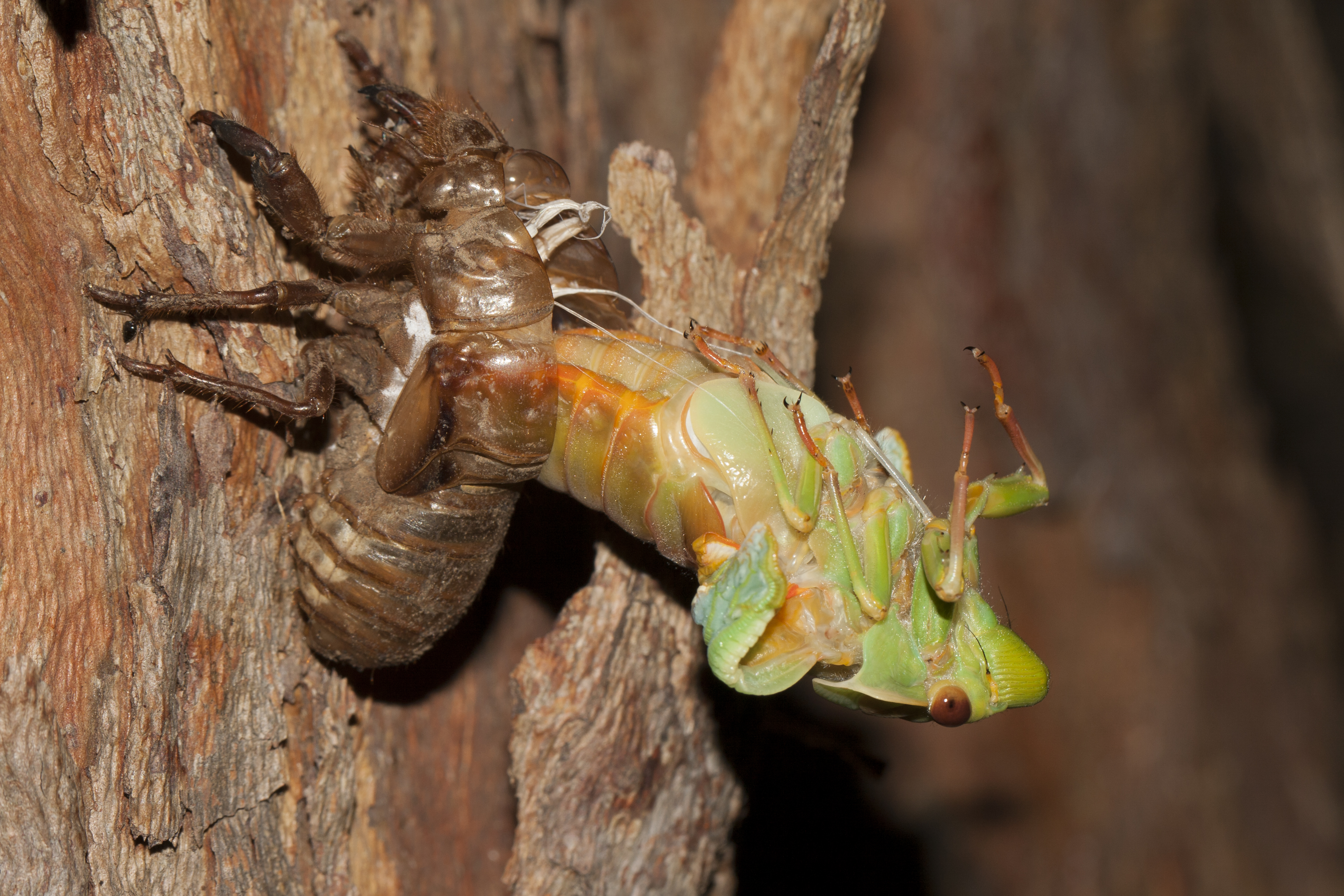
A Green grocer cicada molting

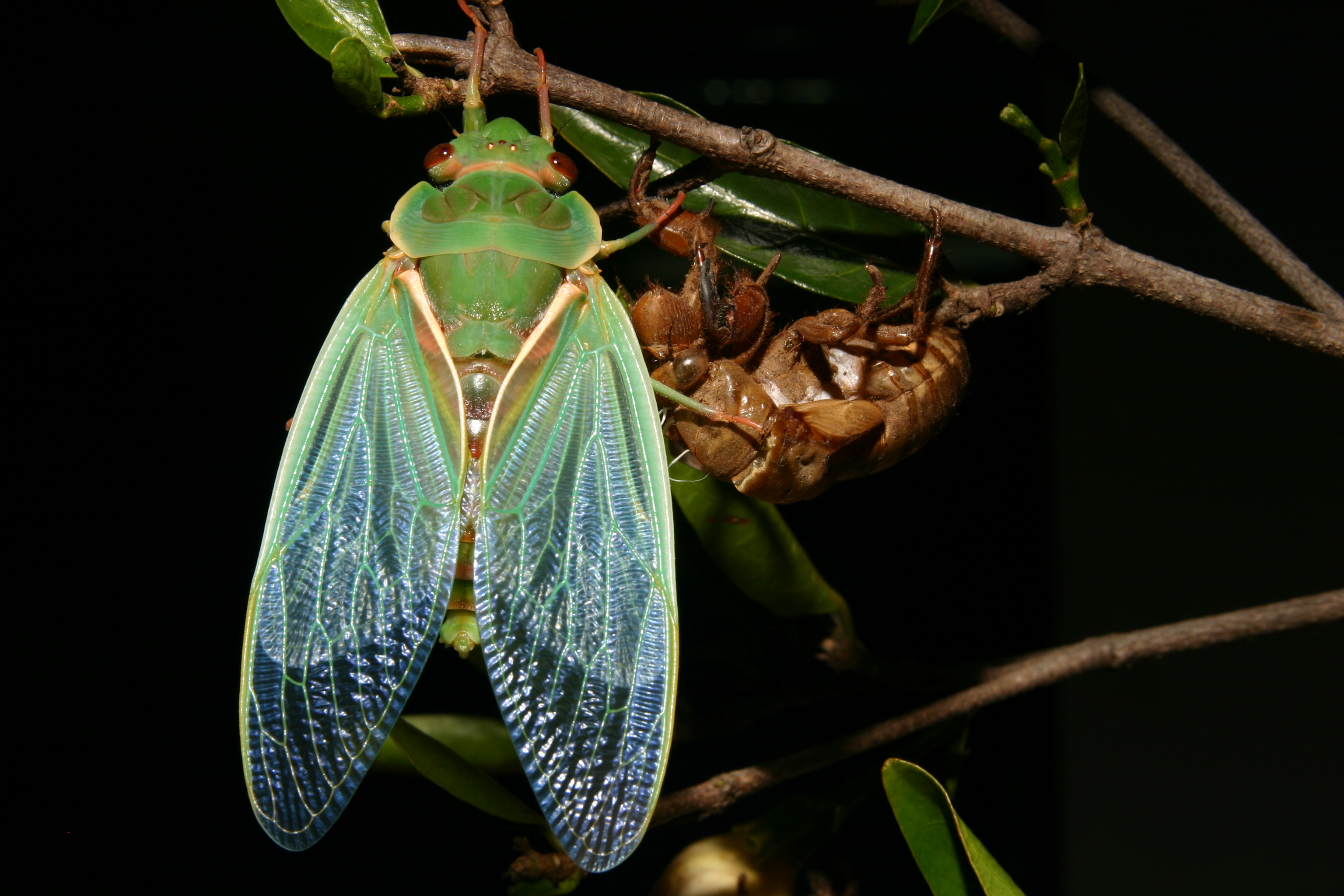
A Green grocer cicada drying its wings

Their median total life cycle length is around six to seven years, this being from egg to a natural adult death. Most of this spent as a nymph. The cicada spends seven years in nymph form drinking sap from plant roots underground before emerging from the earth as an adult. The adults, who live for six weeks, fly around, mate, and breed over the summer.

== Human uses ==
Live cicadas are often collected by climbing trees and can be kept temporarily as pets in shoeboxes. They cannot easily be kept for longer than a day or two, given that they need flowing sap for food.
