= Diduga fumipennis =

Scientific classification
- Kingdom: Animalia
- Phylum: Arthropoda
- Class: Insecta
- Order: Lepidoptera
- Superfamily: Noctuoidea
- Family: Erebidae
- Subfamily: Arctiinae
- Genus: Diduga
- Species: D. fumipennis

Binomial name
- Diduga fumipennis (Hampson, 1891)

Synonyms
- Paidia fumipennis Hampson, 1891

Species of moth

Diduga fumipennis is a moth of the family Erebidae first described by George Hampson in 1891. It is found in India's Nilgiri Mountains.
