= Tabanus fumipennis =

Scientific classification
- Kingdom: Animalia
- Phylum: Arthropoda
- Clade: Pancrustacea
- Class: Insecta
- Order: Diptera
- Family: Tabanidae
- Subfamily: Tabaninae
- Tribe: Tabanini
- Genus: Tabanus
- Species: T. fumipennis

Binomial name
- Tabanus fumipennis Wiedemann, 1828

Synonyms
- Tabanus flammans Walker, 1848; Tabanus formosus Walker, 1848; Tabanus rufus Palisot de Beauvois, 1809

Species of fly

Tabanus fumipennis is a horse fly in the subfamily Tabaninae ("horse flies"), in the order Diptera ("flies").

== Distribution ==
United States.
