= Pseudatteria fumipennis =

Scientific classification
- Domain: Eukaryota
- Kingdom: Animalia
- Phylum: Arthropoda
- Class: Insecta
- Order: Lepidoptera
- Family: Tortricidae
- Genus: Pseudatteria
- Species: P. fumipennis

Binomial name
- Pseudatteria fumipennis (Dognin, 1904)

Synonyms
- Atteria fumipennis Dognin, 1904

Species of moth

Pseudatteria fumipennis is a species of moth of the family Tortricidae. It is found in Colombia.
