= Psaltoda mossi =

Scientific classification
- Kingdom: Animalia
- Phylum: Arthropoda
- Class: Insecta
- Order: Hemiptera
- Suborder: Auchenorrhyncha
- Family: Cicadidae
- Genus: Psaltoda
- Species: P. mossi

Binomial name
- Psaltoda mossi Moulds, 2002

Species of true bug

Psaltoda mossi is a species of cicada native to the vicinity of Cairns in northeastern Australia.
