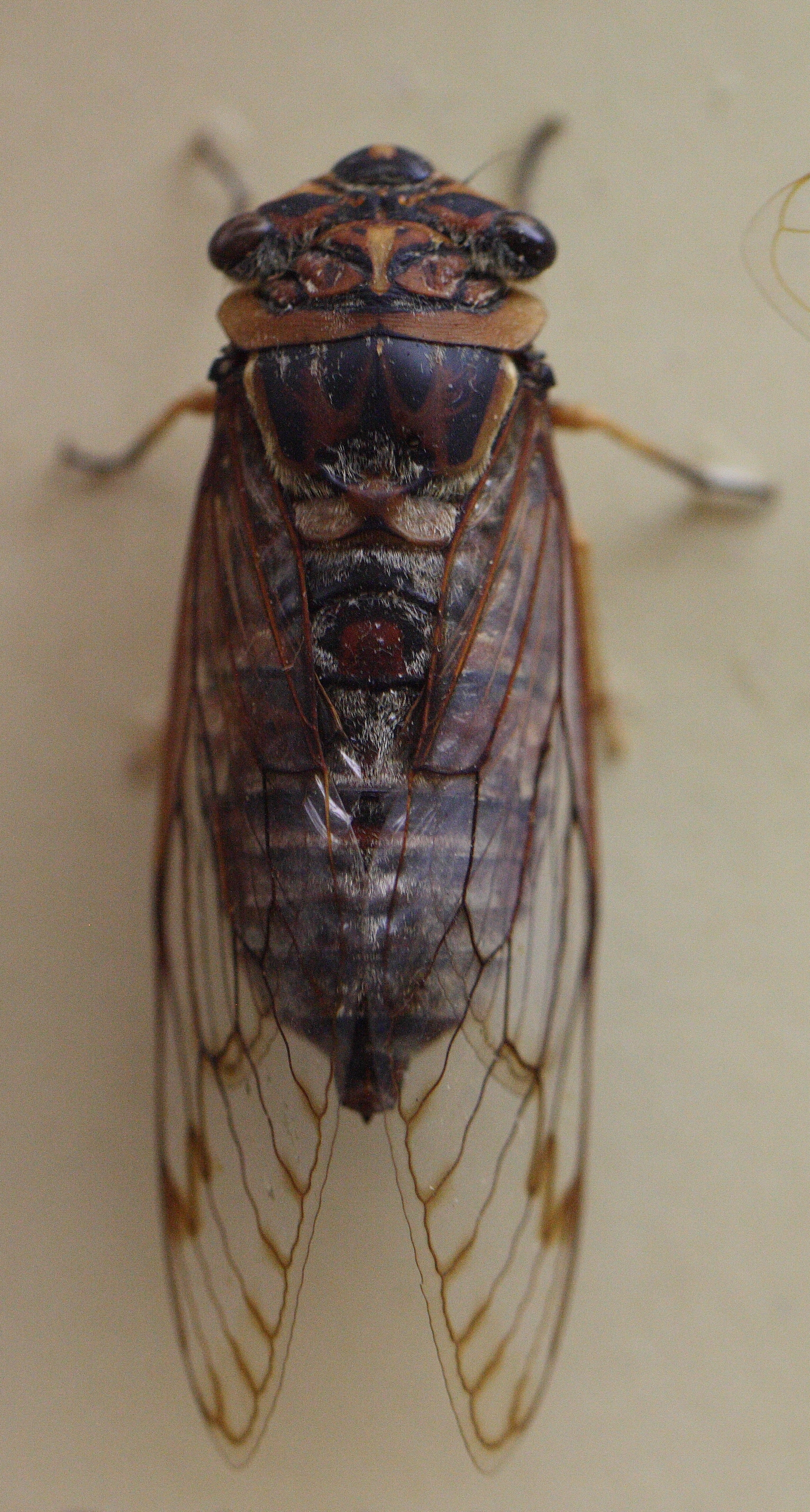
- specimen in the Australian Museum

Scientific classification
- Kingdom: Animalia
- Phylum: Arthropoda
- Class: Insecta
- Order: Hemiptera
- Suborder: Auchenorrhyncha
- Family: Cicadidae
- Genus: Psaltoda
- Species: P. flavescens

Binomial name
- Psaltoda flavescens Distant, 1892

= Psaltoda flavescens =

Species of true bug

Psaltoda flavescens, commonly known as the golden knight, is a species of cicada native to Queensland in eastern Australia.
