= Psaltoda fumipennis =

Scientific classification
- Kingdom: Animalia
- Phylum: Arthropoda
- Class: Insecta
- Order: Hemiptera
- Suborder: Auchenorrhyncha
- Family: Cicadidae
- Genus: Psaltoda
- Species: P. fumipennis

Binomial name
- Psaltoda fumipennis Ashton, 1912

Species of true bug

Psaltoda fumipennis, commonly known as the smoking sage, is a species of cicada native to Queensland in eastern Australia. It was described by Howard Ashton in 1912.
