= Ceramidia fumipennis =

Scientific classification
- Kingdom: Animalia
- Phylum: Arthropoda
- Class: Insecta
- Order: Lepidoptera
- Superfamily: Noctuoidea
- Family: Erebidae
- Subfamily: Arctiinae
- Genus: Ceramidia
- Species: C. fumipennis

Binomial name
- Ceramidia fumipennis (Walker, 1854)

Synonyms
- Euchromia fumipennis Walker, 1854; Ceramidia cataleuca Butler, 1876

Species of moth

Ceramidia fumipennis is a moth of the subfamily Arctiinae. It was described by Francis Walker in 1854. It is found in Ecuador, Suriname and the Amazon region.
