= Psaltoda magnifica =

Scientific classification
- Kingdom: Animalia
- Phylum: Arthropoda
- Class: Insecta
- Order: Hemiptera
- Suborder: Auchenorrhyncha
- Family: Cicadidae
- Genus: Psaltoda
- Species: P. magnifica

Binomial name
- Psaltoda magnifica Moulds, 1984

Species of true bug

Psaltoda magnifica, commonly known as the green baron, is a species of cicada native to northern Queensland in eastern Australia.
