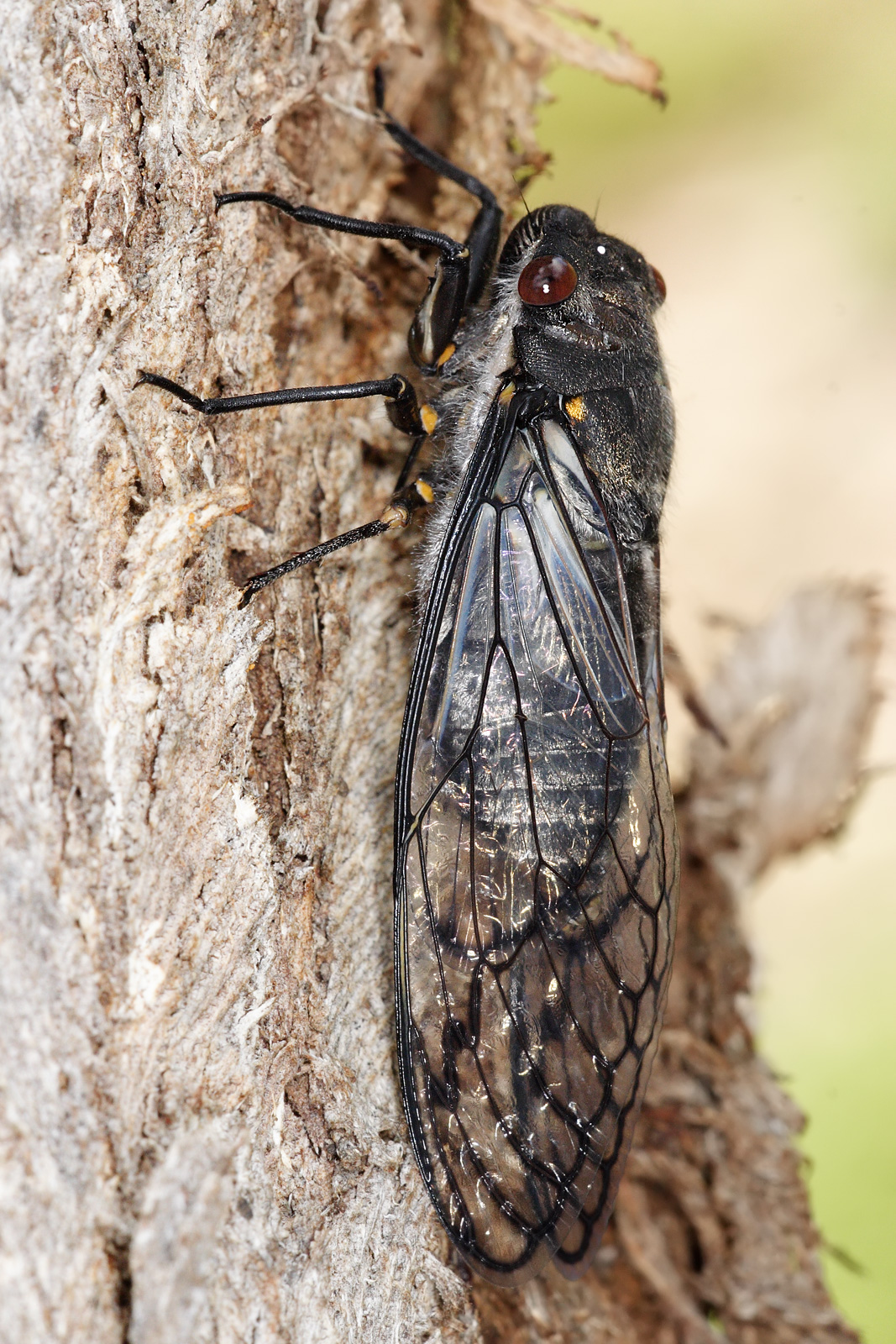
- Redeye on a eucalypt

Scientific classification
- Kingdom: Animalia
- Phylum: Arthropoda
- Class: Insecta
- Order: Hemiptera
- Suborder: Auchenorrhyncha
- Family: Cicadidae
- Genus: Psaltoda
- Species: P. moerens

Binomial name
- Psaltoda moerens (Germar, 1834)

= Psaltoda moerens =

Species of true bug

Psaltoda moerens, commonly known as the redeye, is an Australian species of cicada. It is distributed through the south-east of Australia, from southern Queensland to South Australia, as well as Tasmania. Populations can vary greatly between years; one year they may be present in large numbers and the next they may be entirely absent. They feed primarily on eucalyptus but also on Angophora trees. As they feed on tree sap they expel small droplets of clear waste fluid. When numbers are high, this can form a constant stream.

== Taxonomy ==
The redeye was originally described by German naturalist Ernst Friedrich Germar in 1834 as Cicada moerens, and later transferred to the new genus Psaltoda, where it was designated the type species by Swedish entomologist Carl Stål.

Walter Wilson Froggatt reported that the common name was used by Sydney children in his 1907 work Australian Insects, referring to the colour of the ocelli.

== Description ==
The typical wingspan is around 110–120 mm. The adult is a shiny black above and brown and finely hairy underneath. As the name implies, the eyes are a deep red colour, although pinkish- and brownish-eyed specimens are seen. Heard at any time of day, the call consists of two to twelve (often around six) revving sounds with a yodelling quality, followed by a rattling continuous call. The redeye makes the yodelling sound by flexing its abdomen upwards.

== Distribution and habitat ==
Encountered from November to February only, the redeye is found from the New England region of south-east Queensland through New South Wales and into Victoria and south-eastern South Australia, and Eastern and Northern Tasmania. It is found from the coast inland to Toowoomba and Inverell in the north, and the Grampians and Mount Lofty Ranges in the south. It is found at elevation in the northern parts of its range, and at low altitudes in the southern parts. It appears only irregularly, in some summers and not others, in western Sydney.

The redeye prefers open sclerophyll forest, in particular smooth-barked eucalypts and Angophora species, but will settle for rough-barked species if more suitable trees are not available. Species favoured include Sydney red gum or smooth-barked apple (Angophora costata), scribbly gum (Eucalyptus racemosa), grey box (E. moluccana) and narrow-leaved apple (Angophora bakeri) around Sydney, Eucalyptus grandis in the vicinity of Taree, manna gum (Eucalyptus viminalis), and messmate stringybark (Eucalyptus obliqua) near Adelaide. It has also settled for introduced trees such as the liquidambar (Liquidambar styraciflua), Japanese maple (Acer palmatum), and weeping willow (Salix babylonica). Redeyes settle on the trunks of smoother barked trees, and wherever the bark is smoothest on rougher trees, and may gather in large numbers on some trees while ignoring others nearby. In some cases many thousands of redeyes may inhabit a few trees.

== Behaviour ==
They puncture the bark and may feed for hours at a time. They expel waste fluid which can fall in a constant shower if there are large numbers of redeyes. Redeyes are also attracted to light. The female lays eggs in dead or dying plant tissue only.

The redeye and related black prince are favoured food items of the noisy friarbird, which swallows them head-first and whole. The width of its gape size is similar to that of the two cicada species.

The redeye is preyed upon by the cicada killer wasp (Exeirus lateritius), which stings and paralyses the cicada before storing it in its burrow with the wasp egg. When the larva hatches it consumes the hapless insect.
