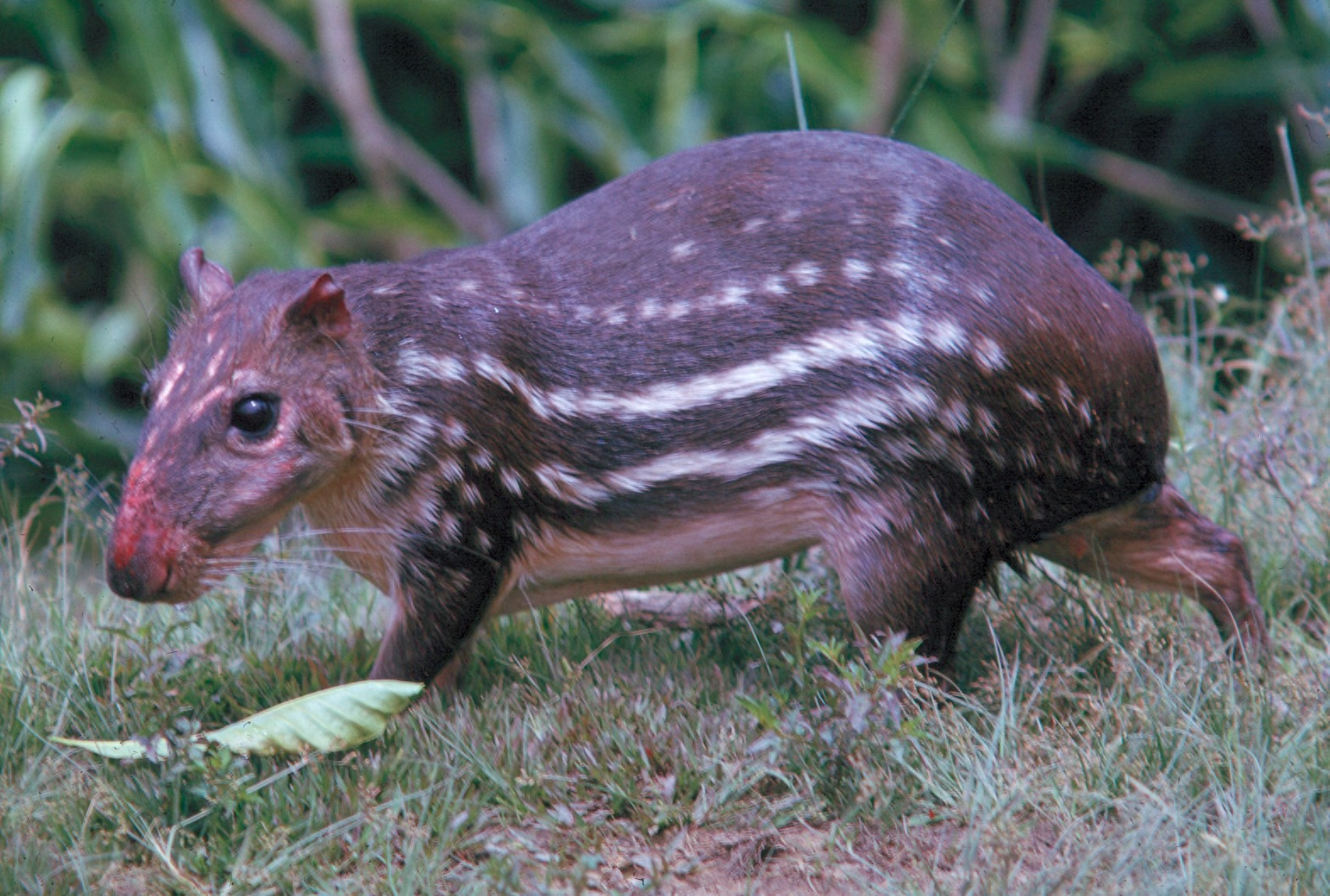

Conservation status
- Least Concern (IUCN 3.1)
- CITES Appendix III

Scientific classification
- Kingdom: Animalia
- Phylum: Chordata
- Class: Mammalia
- Infraclass: Placentalia
- Order: Rodentia
- Family: Cuniculidae
- Genus: Cuniculus
- Species: C. paca

Binomial name
- Cuniculus paca (Linnaeus, 1766)
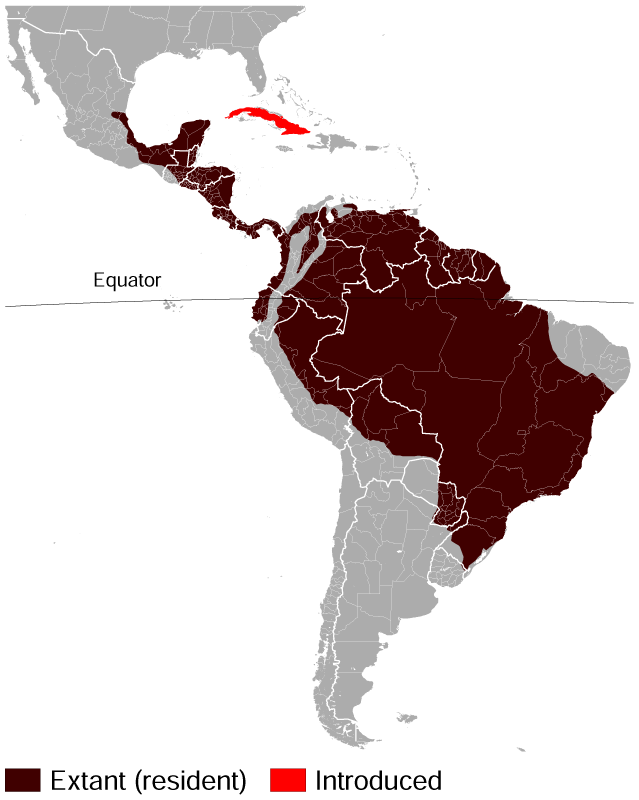
- Lowland paca range

Synonyms
- Mus paca Linnaeus, 1766

= Lowland paca =

Species of rodent

The lowland paca (Cuniculus paca), also known as the spotted paca, is a species of rodent. It has coarse dark brown to black fur, a pale underbelly, and typically 3–5 rows of white spots along its sides. Adults weigh 6 to 12 kilograms (13 to 26 lb). Its zygomatic arch is expanded laterally and dorsally to form a resonating chamber, a feature unique among mammals.

Lowland pacas are primarily nocturnal and solitary. They inhabit forested areas near water, live in burrows, and are strong swimmers that commonly enter the water to escape danger. Their diet consists mainly of plant material, including fruit, seeds, nuts, roots, and tubers, and they act as seed distributors.

Lowland pacas are hunted for their meat and can be agricultural pests, feeding on crops, including yam, cassava, sugar cane, and maize. Their numbers have been reduced by hunting and habitat destruction, although they remain plentiful in protected habitats.

== Names and etymology ==
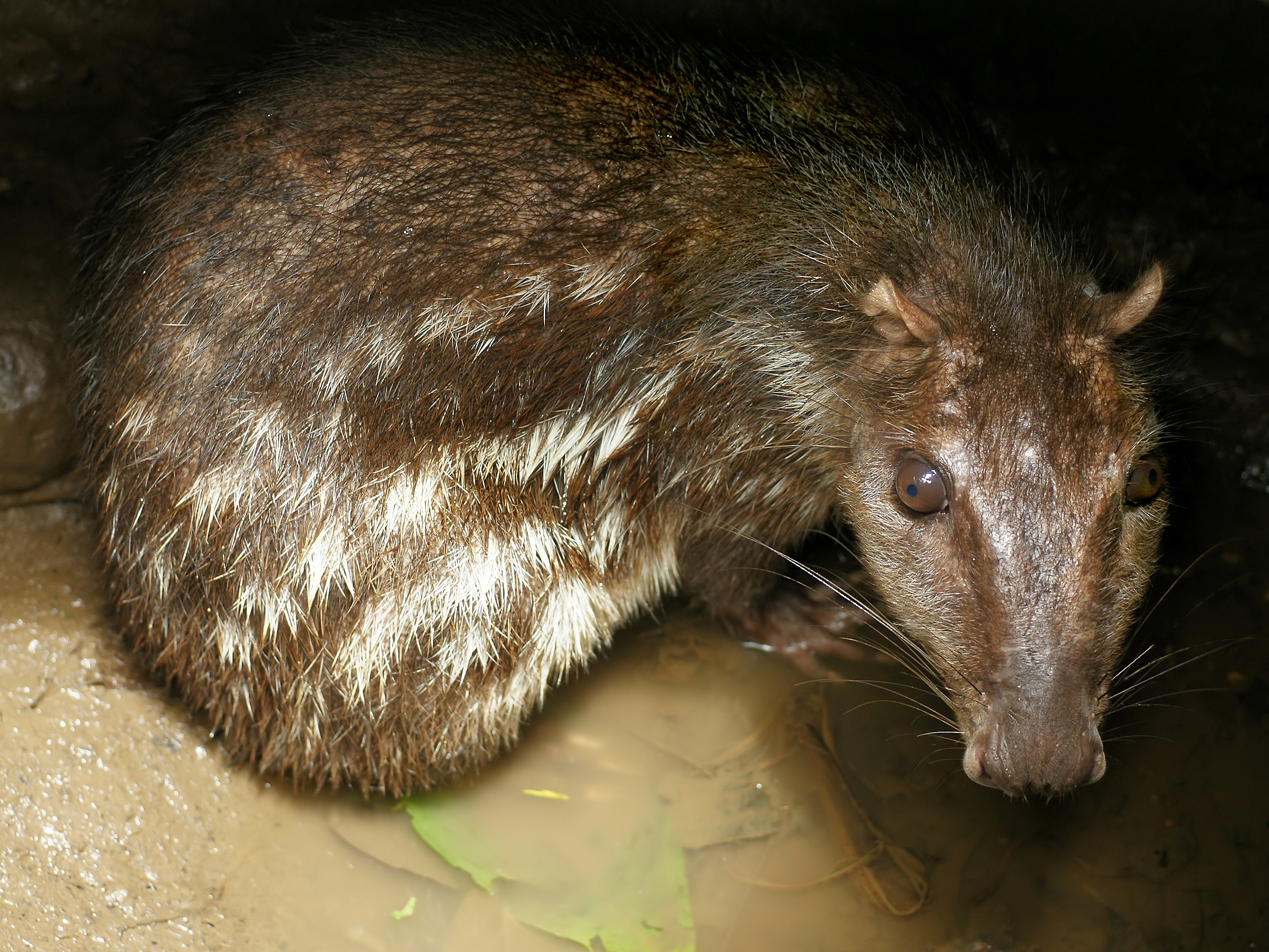
Near Las Horquetas, Costa Rica

The animal is called paca in most of its range, but tepezcuintle (original Aztec language name) in most of Mexico and Central America, tepesquintle in Guatemala, guardatinaja in Nicaragua, pisquinte in northern Costa Rica, tepezcuinte in southern Costa Rica, jaleb in the Yucatán peninsula, conejo pintado in Panama, guanta in Ecuador, majás or picuro in Peru, jochi pintado in Bolivia, and boruga, tinajo, or guartinaja in Colombia. It is also known as the gibnut in Belize, where it is prized as a game animal, labba in Guyana, lapa in Venezuela, and lappe on the island of Trinidad.

The word paca comes from a word in the Tupi language that designates the animal but also means 'awaken, alert'. Tepezcuintle is of Nahuatl origin, meaning 'mountain-dog', from tepetl, 'mountain' + itzquintli, 'dog'.

There is much confusion in the nomenclature of this and related species; see agouti. In particular, the popular term agouti or common agouti normally refers to species of the distinct genus Dasyprocta (such as the Central American agouti, Dasyprocta punctata). Sometimes the word agouti is also used for a polyphyletic grouping uniting the families Cuniculidae and Dasyproctidae, which, besides the pacas and common agoutis, includes also the acouchis (Myoprocta). Cuniculus is the appropriate genus name instead of Agouti based on a 1998 ruling of the International Commission on Zoological Nomenclature as the lowland paca's genus.

== Description ==
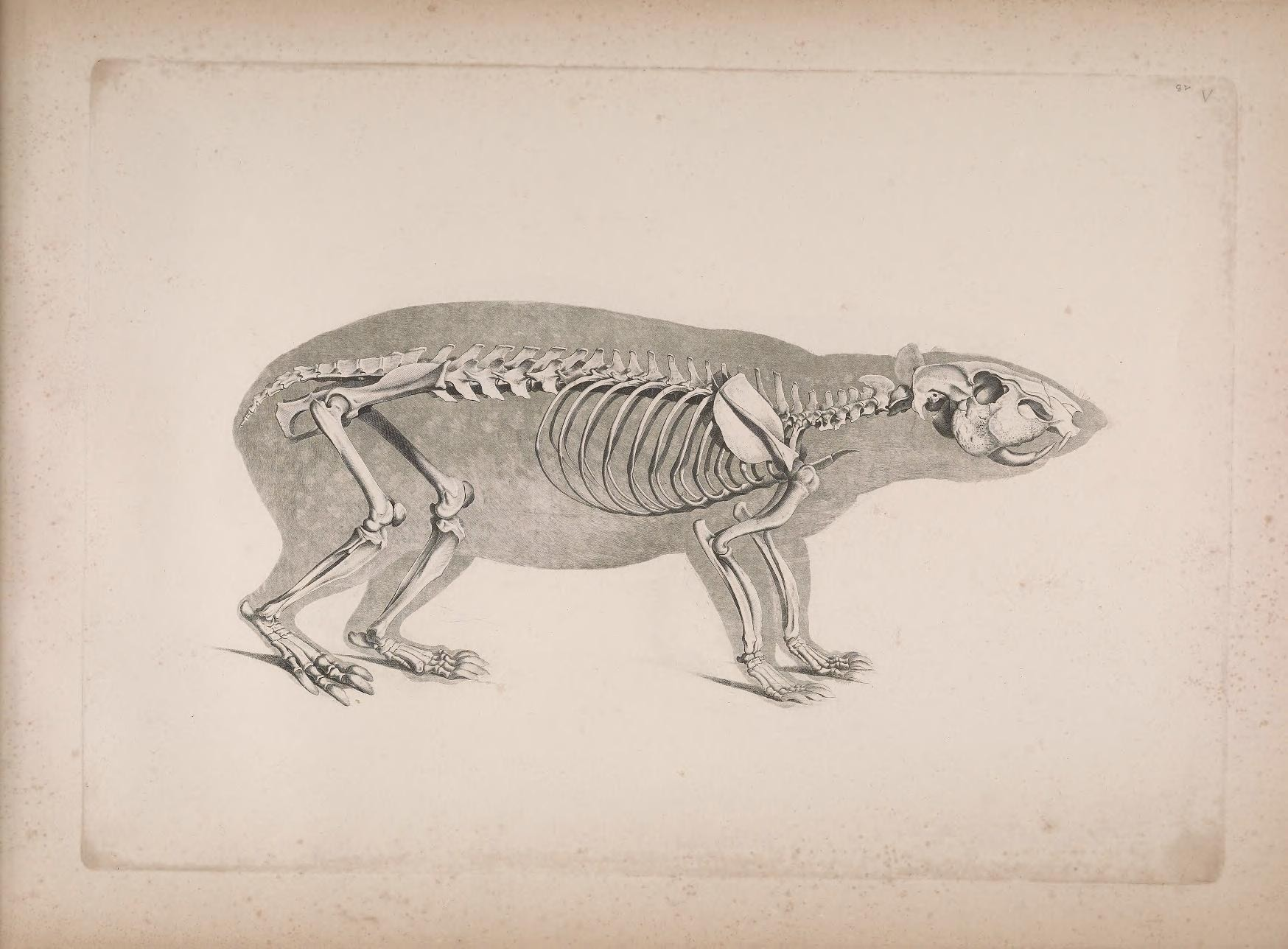
Skeleton

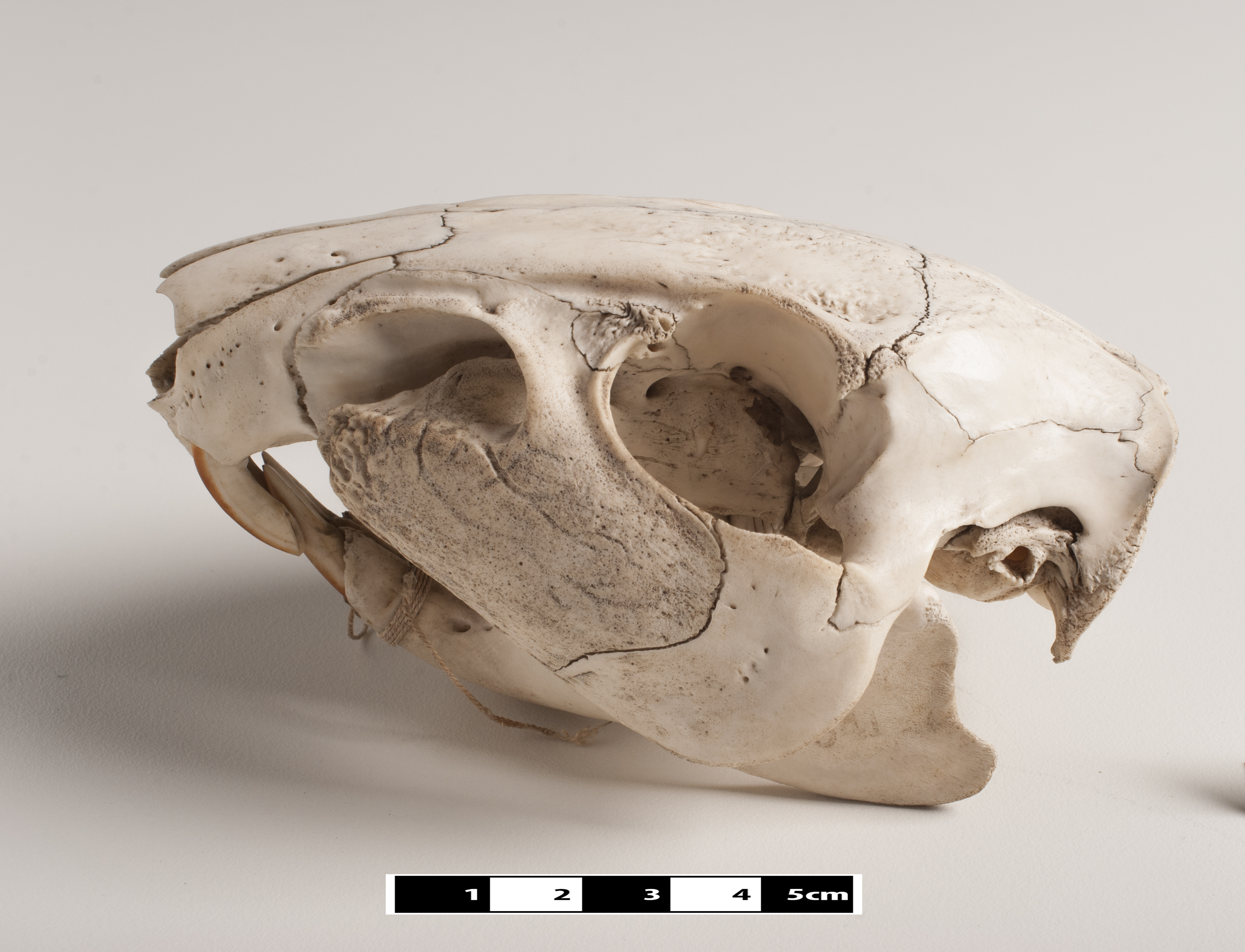
Skull of a lowland paca

The lowland paca has coarse fur without underfur, dark brown to black on the upper body and white or yellowish on the underbelly. It usually has three to five rows of white spots along its sides, against a dark grey background. It has thick strong legs, with four digits in the forefeet and five in the hind feet (the first and fifth are reduced); the nails function as hooves. The tail is short and hairless. The zygomatic arch is expanded laterally and dorsally and is used as a resonating chamber - a unique feature among mammals.

An adult lowland paca weighs between 6 and 12 kilograms (13 and 26 lb). Each litter has one young lowland paca, sometimes two. They usually have one to three young a year with a gestation period of about 115–120 days. Pacas are sexually mature at about 1 year. A paca usually lives up to 13 years.

The lowland paca can carry leishmaniasis and trypanosomiasis.

== Habits ==
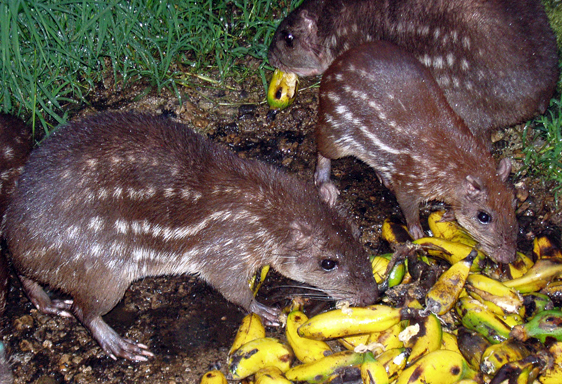
Lowland pacas feeding on fruits

The lowland paca is mostly nocturnal and solitary and does not vocalize very much. It lives in forested habitats near water, preferably smaller rivers, and dig simple burrows about 2 m (6 ft 7 in) below the surface, usually with more than one exit. It can also sometimes live in burrows created by other animals. The lowland paca is a good swimmer and usually heads for the water to escape danger, as it can stay under water for several minutes.

The lowland paca can be considered an important seed distributor, since its diet includes leaves, stems, roots, tubers, nuts, seeds, herbs and fruit, especially avocados, mangos and zapotes, as well as coco macaque, balata, wild chataigne, hog plum, pomerac and guava. Introduced species such as jack-fruit and buri are also eaten. It sometimes stores food. Lowland paca also have necrophagous behavior, consuming carcasses of decomposing animals, possibly to supply protein demands of their diet.

== Economic and ecological aspects ==
The lowland paca is considered an agricultural pest for yam, cassava, sugar cane, maize and other food crops. Its meat is highly prized. It is plentiful in protected habitats, and hence not in danger of extinction, but overall its numbers have been much reduced because of hunting and habitat destruction. It is easily bred and raised in farms, although the taste is said to be inferior (perhaps unpleasant) when farmed. Some of the lowland paca predators include ocelots, jaguars, coyotes, bush dogs, crocodiles, and boa constrictors.

== See also ==
- Mountain paca
