= Lateral line =

Sensory system in fish

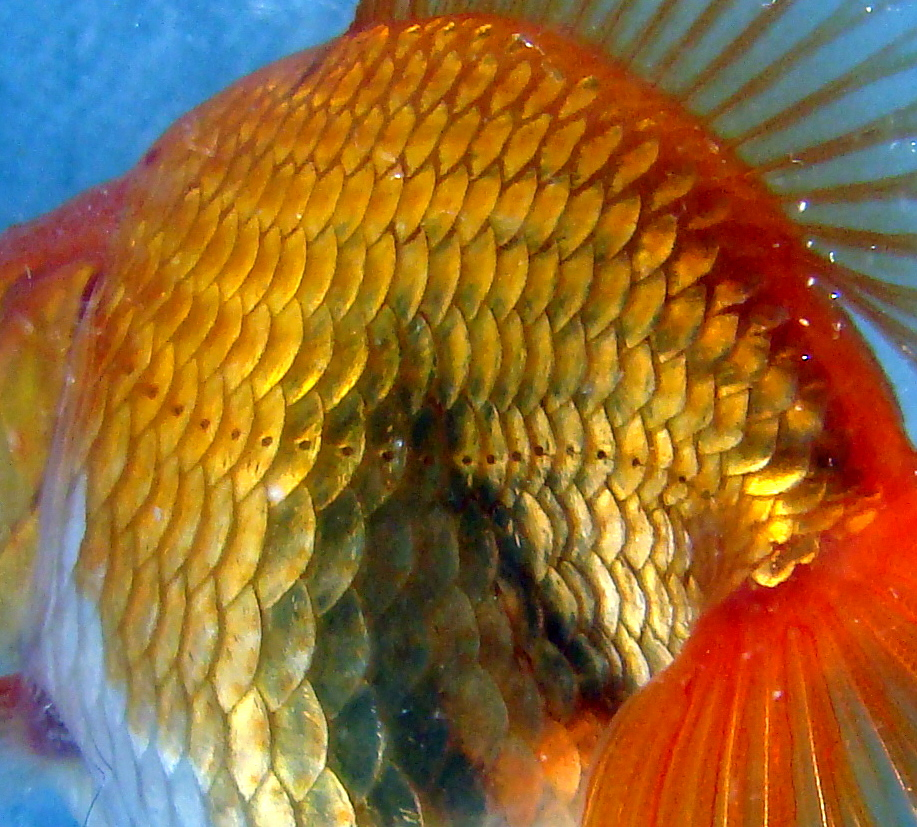
Oblique view of a goldfish (Carassius auratus), showing pored scales of the lateral line system

The lateral line, also called the lateral line organ, is a system of sensory organs found in fish, used to detect movement, vibration, and pressure gradients in the surrounding water. The sensory ability is achieved via modified epithelial cells, known as hair cells, which respond to displacement caused by motion and transduce these signals into electrical impulses via excitatory synapses. Lateral lines play an important role in schooling behavior, predation, and orientation.

Early in the evolution of fish, some of the sensory organs of the lateral line were modified to function as the electroreceptors called ampullae of Lorenzini. The lateral line system is ancient and basal to the vertebrate clade, as it is found in fishes that diverged over 400 million years ago.

== Function ==
The lateral line system allows the detection of movement, vibration, and pressure gradients in the water surrounding an animal. It plays an essential role in orientation, predation, and fish schooling by providing spatial awareness and the ability to navigate in the environment. Analysis has shown that the lateral line system should be an effective passive sensing system able to discriminate between submerged obstacles by their shape. The lateral line allows fish to navigate and hunt in water with poor visibility.

The lateral line system enables predatory fishes to detect vibrations made by their prey, and to orient towards the source to begin predatory action. Blinded predatory fishes remain able to hunt, but not when lateral line function is inhibited by cobalt ions.

The lateral line plays a role in fish schooling. Blinded Pollachius virens were able to integrate into a school, whereas fish with severed lateral lines could not. It may have evolved further to allow fish to forage in dark caves. In Mexican blind cave fish, Astyanax mexicanus, neuromasts (organs in the lateral line system) in and around the orbit of the eye are bigger and therefore around twice as sensitive as those of surface-living fish of the same species.

One function of schooling may be to confuse the lateral line of predatory fishes. A single prey fish creates a simple particle velocity pattern, whereas the pressure gradients of many closely swimming (schooling) prey fish overlap, creating a complex pattern. This makes it difficult for predatory fishes to identify individual prey through lateral line perception.

== Anatomy ==
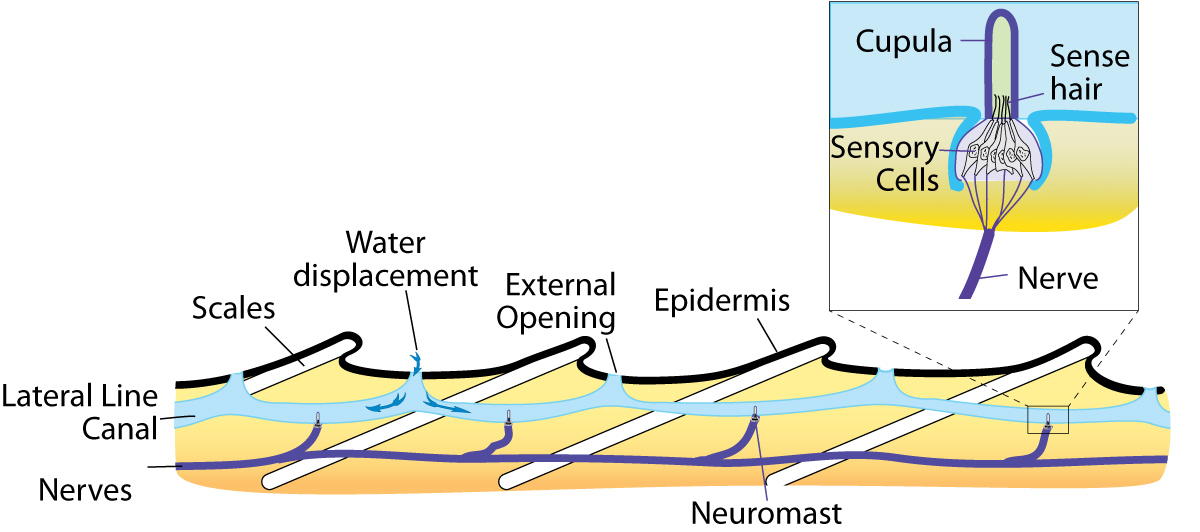
The lateral line system consists of canals that run along a fish's body, connecting rows of openings (pores) through the skin and scales to the water outside the body. Small sense organs, neuromasts (inset), are positioned both at intervals along the canals, and on the surface of the body. Each hair cell contains a bundle of sensory hairs.

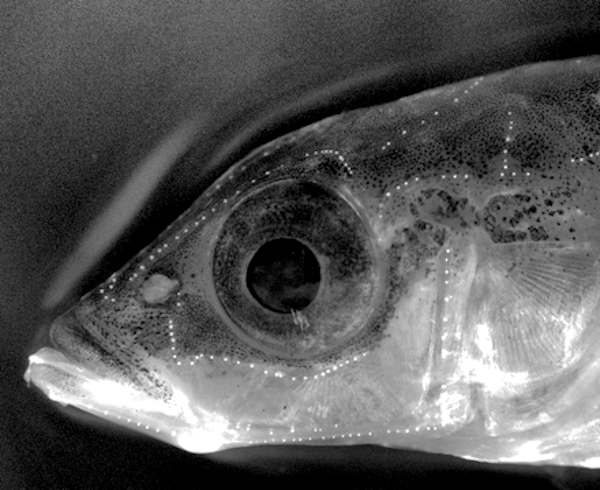
A three-spined stickleback with stained neuromasts

Lateral lines are usually visible as faint lines of pores running along each side of a fish's body. The functional units of the lateral line are the neuromasts, discrete mechanoreceptive organs that sense movement in water. There are two main varieties: canal neuromasts and superficial neuromasts. Superficial neuromasts are on the surface of the body, while canal neuromasts are along the lateral lines in subdermal, fluid-filled canals. Each neuromast consists of receptive hair cells whose tips are covered by a flexible jellylike cupula. Hair cells typically possess both glutamatergic afferent connections and cholinergic efferent connections. The receptive hair cells are modified epithelial cells; they typically possess bundles of 40–50 microvilli "hairs" which function as the mechanoreceptors. Within each bundle, the hairs are organized in a rough "staircase" from shortest to longest.

== Signal transduction ==
Lateral line rate coding indicates direction and sometimes strength of stimulus. One neuromast shown.

The hair cells are stimulated by the deflection of their hair bundles in the direction of the tallest "hairs" or stereocilia. The deflection allows cations to enter through a mechanically gated channel, causing depolarization or hyperpolarization of the hair cell. Depolarization opens Ca_{v}1.3 calcium channels in the basolateral membrane.

Hair cells use a system of transduction with rate coding to transmit the directionality of a stimulus. The hair cells produce a constant, tonic rate of firing. As mechanical motion is transmitted through water to the neuromast, the cupula bends and is displaced according to the strength of the stimulus. This results in a shift in the cell's ionic permeability. Deflection towards the longest hair results in depolarization of the hair cell, increased neurotransmitter release at the excitatory afferent synapse, and a higher rate of signal transduction. Deflection towards the shorter hair has the opposite effect, hyperpolarizing the hair cell and producing a decreased rate of neurotransmitter release. These electrical impulses are then transmitted along afferent lateral neurons to the brain.

While both varieties of neuromasts utilize this method of transduction, their specialized organization gives them different mechanoreceptive capacities. Superficial organs are exposed more directly to the external environment. The organization of the bundles within their organs is seemingly haphazard, incorporating various shapes and sizes of microvilli within bundles. This suggests coarse but wide-ranging detection. In contrast, the structure of canal organs allow canal neuromasts more sophisticated mechanoreception, such as of pressure differentials. As current moves across the pores, a pressure differential is created, inducing a flow in the canal fluid. This moves the cupulae of the neuromasts in the canal, resulting in a deflection of the hairs in the direction of the flow.

== Electrophysiology ==
The mechanoreceptive hair cells of the lateral line structure are integrated into more complex circuits through their afferent and efferent connections. The synapses that directly participate in the transduction of mechanical information are excitatory afferent connections that utilize glutamate. Species vary in their neuromast and afferent connections, providing differing mechanoreceptive properties. For instance, the superficial neuromasts of the midshipman fish, Porichthys notatus, are sensitive to specific stimulation frequencies. One variety is attuned to collect information about acceleration, at stimulation frequencies between 30 and 200 Hz. The other type obtains information about velocity, and is most receptive to stimulation below 30 Hz.

The motion detection system in fish works despite "noise" created by the fish itself. The brain copies the efferent commands it gives to the swimming muscles to the lateral line, effectively suppressing swimming noise and revealing small signals from the environment, such as from prey.

The efferent synapses to hair cells are inhibitory and use acetylcholine as a transmitter. They are crucial participants in a corollary discharge system designed to limit self-generated interference. When a fish moves, it creates disturbances in the water that could be detected by the lateral line system, potentially interfering with the detection of other biologically relevant signals. To prevent this, an efferent signal is sent to the hair cell upon motor action, resulting in inhibition which counteracts the excitation resulting from reception of the self-generated stimulation. This allows the fish to detect external stimuli without interference from its own movements. Some efferent projections to lateral line hair cells use dopamine as a transmitter, likely enhancing the activity of hair cell presynaptic calcium channels and thereby increasing neurotransmission.

Signals from the hair cells are transmitted along lateral neurons to the brain. The area where these signals most often terminate is the medial octavolateralis nucleus (MON), which probably processes and integrates mechanoreceptive information. The deep MON contains distinct layers of basilar and non-basilar crest cells, suggesting computational pathways analogous to the electrosensory lateral line lobe of electric fish. The MON is likely involved in the integration of excitatory and inhibitory parallel circuits to interpret mechanoreceptive information.

== Evolution ==
The electroreceptive organs called ampullae of Lorenzini (red dots), illustrated here on the head of a shark, evolved from the mechanosensory lateral line organs (gray lines) of the last common ancestor of vertebrates.

The use of mechanosensitive hairs is homologous to the functioning of hair cells in the auditory and vestibular systems, indicating a close link between these systems. Due to many overlapping functions and their great similarity in ultrastructure and development, the lateral line system and the inner ear of fish are often grouped together as the octavolateralis system (OLS). Here, the lateral line system detects particle velocities and accelerations with frequencies below 100 Hz. These low frequencies create large wavelengths, which induce strong particle accelerations in the near field of swimming fish that do not radiate into the far field as acoustic waves due to an acoustic short circuit. The auditory system detects pressure fluctuations with frequencies above 100 Hz that propagate to the far field as waves.

The lateral line system is ancient and basal to the vertebrate clade; it is found in groups of fishes that diverged over 400 million years ago, including the lampreys, cartilaginous fishes, and bony fishes. Most amphibian larvae and some fully aquatic adult amphibians possess mechanosensitive systems comparable to the lateral line. The terrestrial tetrapods have secondarily lost their lateral line organs, which are ineffective when not submerged.

The electroreceptive organs, called ampullae of Lorenzini, appearing as pits in the skin of sharks and some other fishes, evolved from the lateral line organ. Passive electroreception using ampullae is an ancestral trait in the vertebrates, meaning that it was present in their last common ancestor.

- Vertebrates Lateral line
  - Lampreys >440 mya
  - Jawed fishes Ampullae of Lorenzini
    - - 430 mya
        Cartilaginous fishes
      - Bony fishes 425 mya
        - Lobe-finned fishes
          - Coelacanths
          - - - Lungfish
              - - Amphibians (as larvae; some as adults)
                - (no lateral line)
                  Other tetrapods
        - Ray-finned fishes

== See also ==
- Artificial lateral line
