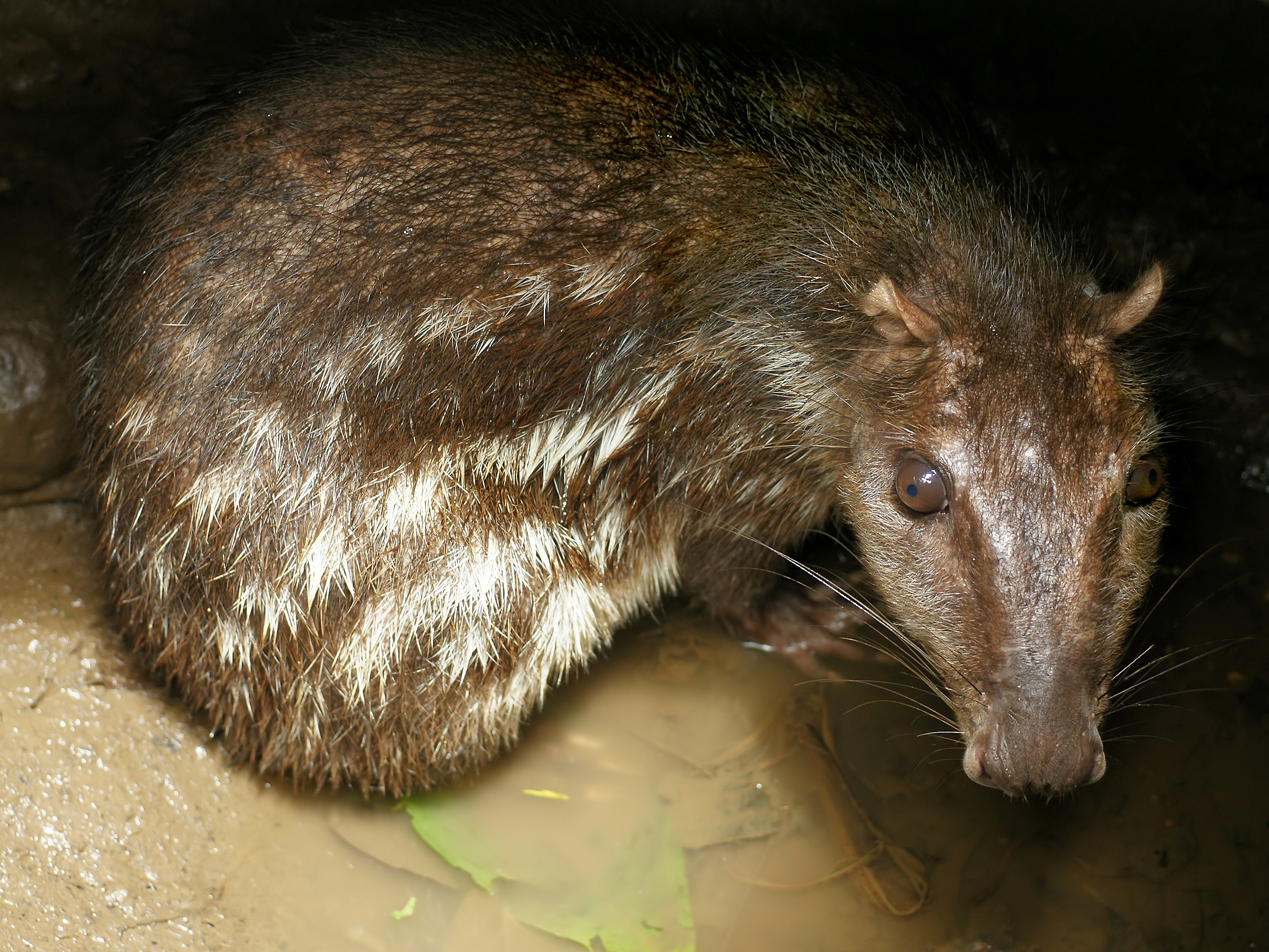
- Lowland paca

Scientific classification
- Kingdom: Animalia
- Phylum: Chordata
- Class: Mammalia
- Order: Rodentia
- Infraorder: Hystricognathi
- Parvorder: Caviomorpha
- Superfamily: Cavioidea
- Family: Cuniculidae; Miller & Gidley, 1918
- Genus: Cuniculus; Brisson, 1762

Type species
- Mus paca Linnaeus, 1766

Species
- Cuniculus paca Cuniculus taczanowskii Cuniculus hernandezi (validity questionable)
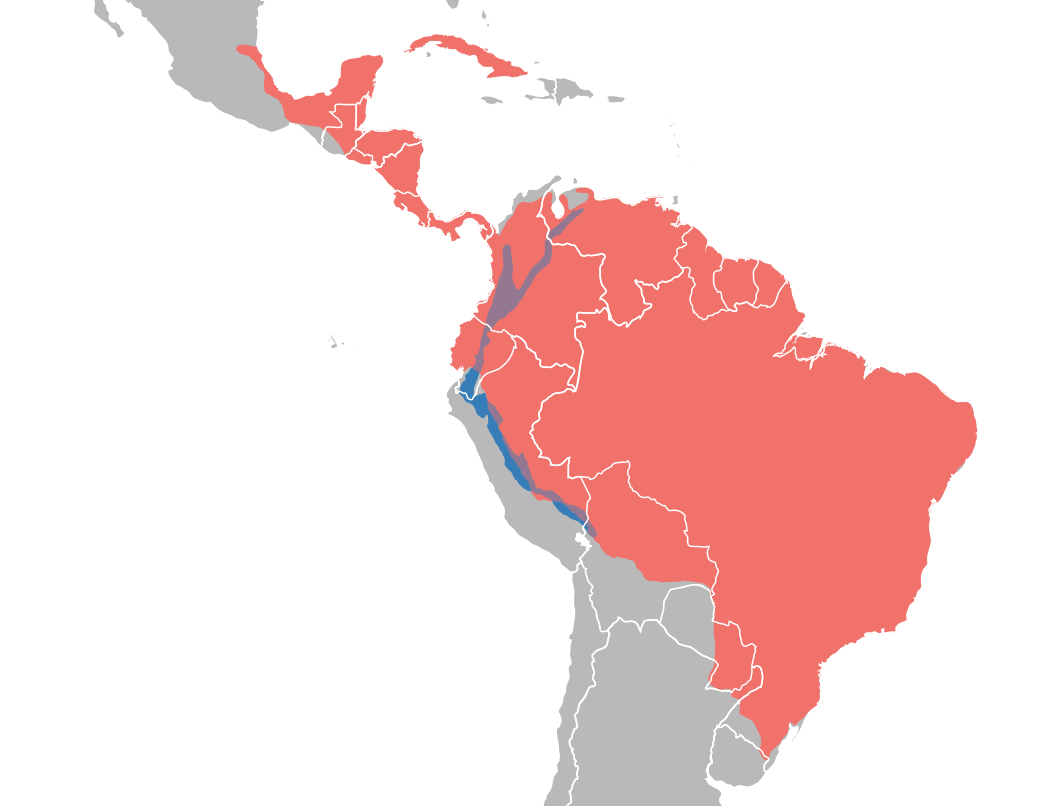
- Cuniculidae distribution. Cuniculus paca in red, Cuniculus taczanowskii in blue (brighter where range does not overlap C. paca).

Synonyms
- For Cuniculidae: Agoutidae Gray, 1821; Coelogenyidae Gervais, 1849; For Cuniculus: Agouti Lacépède, 1799; Caelogenus Fleming, 1822; Caelogenys Agassiz, 1842; Coelogenus Cuvier, 1807; Coelogenys Illiger, 1811; Mamcoelogenysus Herrera, 1899; Osteopera Harlan, 1825; Paca Fischer, 1814; Stictomys Thomas, 1924

= Paca =

Genus of rodents

A paca (from Tupí paka) is a member of the genus Cuniculus of ground-dwelling, herbivorous rodents in South and Central America. It is the only genus in the family Cuniculidae. Pacas are large rodents with dots and stripes on their sides, short ears, and barely visible tails. Pacas are eaten by people in Belize, where they are known as gibnut (and also, having been served to Queen Elizabeth II, as "the royal rat"). In the Amazon basin they are known as majás. In Guyanese English they are known as labba, from the Lokono language. In Trinidad they are known as lappe and are highly prized as game animals, the cooked meat being considered quite a delicacy among wildmeat enthusiasts.

== Scientific name ==
Because Brisson's 1762 work did not consistently apply binominal nomenclature, the generic name Cuniculus as published there was unavailable under the usual provisions of the International Code of Zoological Nomenclature. Consequently, the replacement name Agouti and the family-group name Agoutidae came into use (despite the fact that this genus contains no agoutis). In 1998, however, the International Commission on Zoological Nomenclature exercised its plenary power to conserve eleven mammalian generic names first published by Brisson, including Cuniculus.

== Evolutionary background ==
Pacas originated in South America and are one of the few mammal species that successfully emigrated to North America after the Great American Interchange 3 million years ago. They were formerly grouped with the agoutis in the family Dasyproctidae, as the subfamily Agoutinae, but were given full family status because they differ in the number of toes, the shape of the skull, and coat patterning.

== Description ==
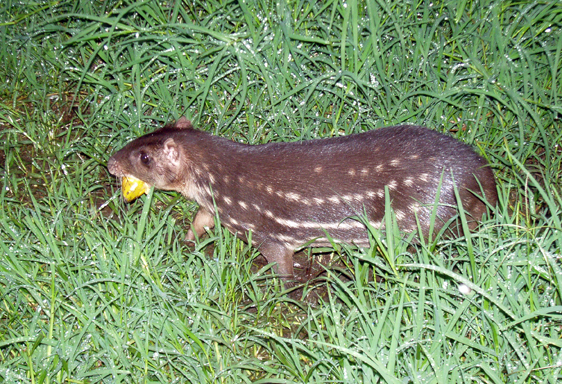
Paca

Pacas are 50–77 cm (20–30 in) in length, excluding the 13–23 cm (5–9 in) short tail, weigh 6–14 kg (13–31 lb), and are the fourteenth-largest rodents in the world. In common with guinea pigs they have square heads, small ears, sides patterned with spots and stripes, and virtually invisible tails.

With large hind limbs, small fore limbs, and cone-shaped bodies, pacas are similar in appearance to the deer-like, ungulate chevrotains, and like them have four to seven horizontal lines of blotches and stripes along their flanks. They have a heavy and robust appearance, though their legs are long and relatively tiny. Their small ears are set high on their heads. They have four toes on their fore feet and five on their hind feet (of which two are short and hardly touch the ground) and they have stout nails that resemble small hooves. In young pacas, the skin is covered with horny scales about 2 mm (0.079 in) in diameter; perhaps these scales have a protective function against smaller predators. There is virtually no difference between sexes. They can live up to 13 years in the wild.

== Behavior ==
Pacas inhabit rainforests, cloud forests, and sometimes more open habitats. They are great swimmers and prefer to be near water. They dive when threatened and can stay submerged up to 15 minutes. They can also jump up to 1 m (3 ft 3 in) and freeze for up to 45 minutes. They normally move along well-established paths and will create new paths when old ones are disturbed.

They are normally passive in daytime and forage in the morning and afternoon, but can be strictly nocturnal in areas with many predators. They live in burrows up to 3 m (10 ft) deep, normally with two entrances covered with leaves to hide the burrow and to serve as an early warning system. Burrows are often near water, but always above the seasonal flood line. Predators other than humans include jaguar, puma, ocelot, margay, jaguarundi, bush dog, boa constrictor, and caiman.

Pacas have resonating chambers in their cheeks, and their growling noise is surprisingly loud for their size. Aside from making noises, they also mark their territory with urine. Population density can reach up to 70 adults per 1 ha (2.5 acres), and pacas often constitute some 20% of the biomass of terrestrial mammals in an area where their population is dense.

== Feeding ==
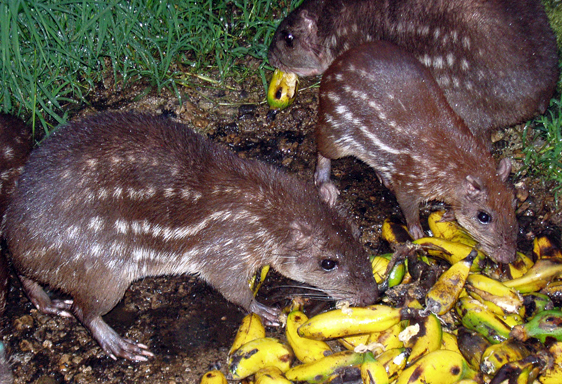
Foraging pacas in Costa Rica

In the wild, pacas eat fruits from understory trees and fallen fruits from taller trees, but may also eat leaves, buds, flowers, fungi, and insects. They play a vital role in seed dispersal, and, with seasonal adaptations, their home ranges are often centered on a group of fruit trees. Pacas normally do not use their fore-paws to manipulate fruits (as do agoutis), instead using their powerful jaw muscles to break open hard-shelled fruits. Unlike agoutis, pacas can store fat, and so are less dependent on the caching of seeds. Competition from agoutis is avoided by a slight variation in activity cycles and food preferences. Like rabbits, pacas are coprophagous and absorb protein and carbohydrates from specially produced moist fecal pellets. Before allowing their young to suckle, mothers lick them to stimulate them to defecate and urinate, and then lick the resulting product, both to feed herself and to prevent the odour from attracting predators.

== Reproduction ==
Gestation lasts between 114 and 119 days with about 190 days between births. Pacas are precocial; the young are born with fur and open eyes. Normally, mothers give birth to one young, but she can give birth up to three times per year if conditions allow. More than one birth per year results in lactation periods overlapping pregnancies. Weaning begins after six weeks, but the young start to follow their mothers early and can do so for up to a year.

Sexual maturity is reached after 6–12 months, when females weigh about 6.5 kg (14 lb) and males 7.5 kg (17 lb). Pacas usually mate in water. As the male approaches the female, she starts to hop enthusiastically, more so if he sprays her with urine. Pacas have altered the common rodent strategy — safety in numbers — and mind their offspring carefully. At 650–710 g (23–25 oz) at birth, the young are born in holes too small for both predators and the mother to enter, which are then covered with leaves and twigs. To invite the young out of the hole, the mother uses a low rolling vocalization. Suckling usually lasts for 90 days, after which the young weighs 4 kg (8.8 lb).

== Distribution and habitat ==
The lowland paca is found from southern Mexico to northern Argentina. They primarily live in rainforests near streams, but can also be found in a wide variety of habitats, including mangrove swamps, gallery forests near water currents, and even in public parks. They have been observed up to 2,500 m (8,200 ft) above sea level.

The smaller mountain paca lives in the northern Andes and the Páramo grasslands, with a peak occurrence between 2,000 and 3,000 m (6,600 and 9,800 ft) above sea level.

== Species ==
The mountain paca has longer and darker fur than the lowland paca. Observations indicate mountain pacas are found between 1,500 and 2,800 m (4,900 and 9,200 ft) above sea level.

- Lowland paca, Cuniculus paca (Agouti paca)
- Mountain paca, Cuniculus taczanowskii
- Cuniculus hernandezi (a recent and disputed nomen nudum)

== Potential use by humans ==
The Smithsonian Tropical Research Institute in Panama has studied the possibilities of developing the paca as a food supply for people in the tropics.
