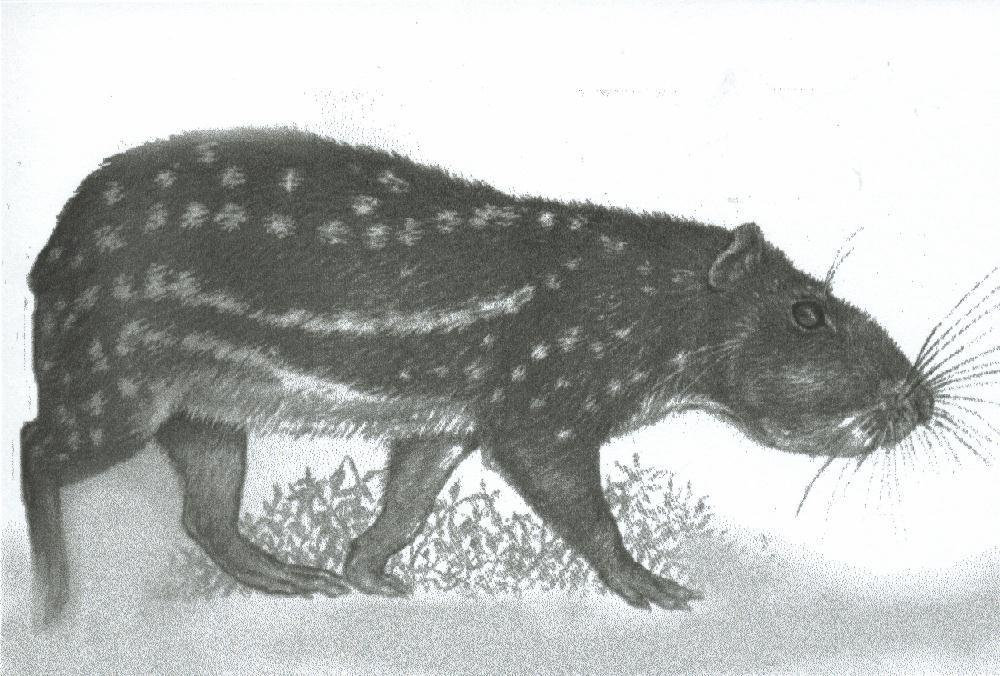

Conservation status
- Near Threatened (IUCN 3.1)

Scientific classification
- Kingdom: Animalia
- Phylum: Chordata
- Class: Mammalia
- Order: Rodentia
- Family: Cuniculidae
- Genus: Cuniculus
- Species: C. taczanowskii

Binomial name
- Cuniculus taczanowskii (Stolzmann, 1885)
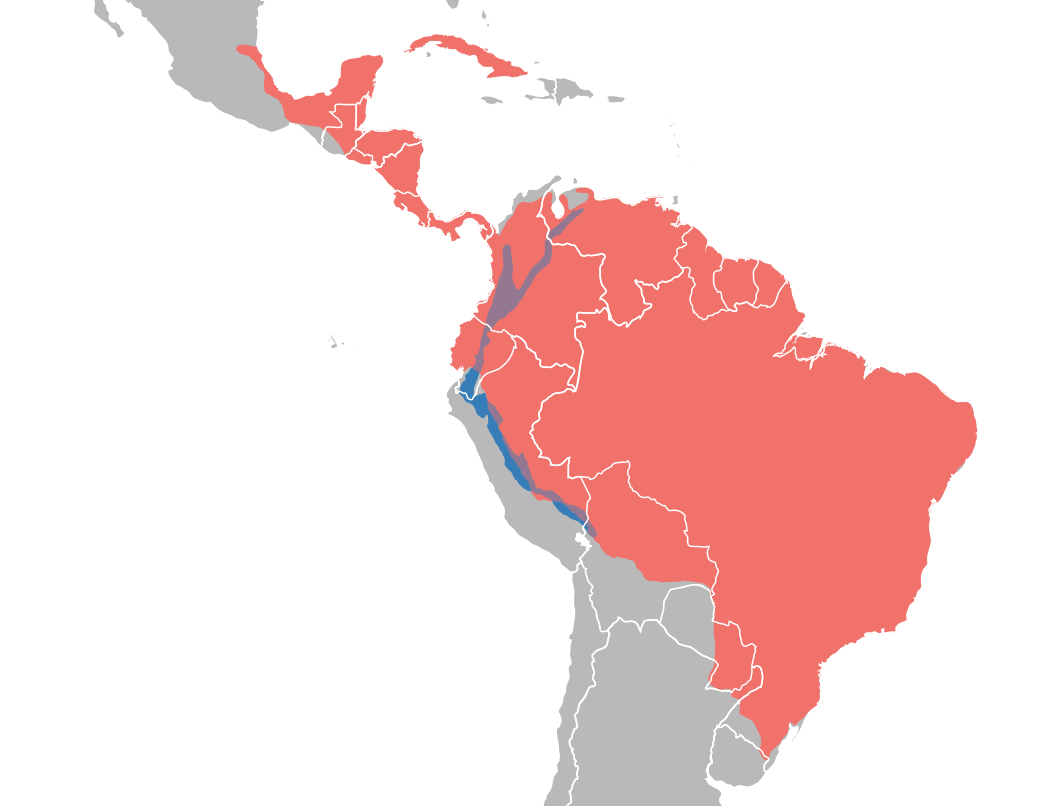
- Cuniculidae distribution. Cuniculus paca in red, Cuniculus taczanowskii in blue (brighter where range does not overlap C. paca).

Synonyms
- Agouti taczanowskii

= Mountain paca =

Species of rodent

The mountain paca (Cuniculus taczanowskii) is a small burrow-dwelling rodent whose habitats are high altitude South American forests. Pacas are nocturnal, sedentary, and solitary animals with territorial tendencies. It eats mostly fruits and seeds. The mountain paca primarily inhabits higher Andean montane forest regions in Venezuela, Colombia, Ecuador, Peru and Bolivia.

This paca has coarse fur without underfur, dark brown to black on the upper body and white or yellowish on the underbelly. It usually has three to five rows of white spots along its sides, against a dark grey background. It has thick strong legs, with four digits in the forefeet and five in the hind feet (the first and fifth are reduced); the nails function as hooves. The tail is short and hairless. The zygomatic arch is expanded laterally and dorsally and is used as a resonating chamber—a unique feature among mammals.

The mountain paca is hunted for its meat, which is high in calories and is considered a delicacy particularly in rural communities. Due to its quick growth, it may be bred in captivity for commercial use. However, it has a low reproductive capacity and its numbers have been significantly reduced in recent years due to hunting and habitat destruction. It is fairly abundant in protected areas.

== Cuniculus hernandezi ==
Cuniculus hernandezi Castro, López & Becerra, 2010 is a name coined for a proposed species of paca described as an endemic to the Central Andes in Colombia, the only place it has been identified as such to date. Individuals may weigh over 14 pounds (6.4 kg), making C. hernandezi a rather large rodent. The authors omitted a description of the animal, but it is thought to be very similar to the mountain paca, C. taczanowskii, from which this taxon was split. According to the authors, analysis of its mitochondrial DNA and karyotypy indicated that it may be a distinct species. The specific epithet honours Colombian biologist Dr. Jorge Hernández Camacho.

Héctor Ramírez-Chaves and Sergio Solari, in 2014, argued that the species is not an available name (nomen nudum) according to the rules of the current International Code of Zoological Nomenclature (ICZN), due to imprecise definition of the taxon and lack of a type specimen. Not only is the taxonomy blundered; the original research also used a faulty methodology with limited data to obtain their genetic tree, omitted to publish important results validating (or not) their conclusions, neglected a study of the availability of previously proposed names for pacas found in the region (old synonyms; i.e. C. serriae in Colombia and Venezuela), and presented no evidence with which to identify the taxon (even the illustrations lack identifications). Although the authors claim that the taxon is easily differentiated by the size of the interparietal bone, they then mention that morphological measurements cannot distinguish the taxon, nor do they provide any evidence to back these assertions. Furthermore, no evidence was presented restricting the taxon to the central Cordilleras.
