= Artificial lateral line =

An Artificial Lateral Line (ALL) is a biomimetic lateral line system. A lateral line is a system of sensory organs in aquatic animals such as fish, that serves to detect movement, vibration, and pressure gradients in their environment. An artificial lateral line is an artificial biomimetic array of distinct mechanosensory transducers that, similarly, permits the formation of a spatial-temporal image of the sources in immediate vicinity based on hydrodynamic signatures; the purpose is to assist in obstacle avoidance and object tracking. The biomimetic lateral line system has the potential to improve navigation in underwater vehicles when vision is partially or fully compromised. Underwater navigation is challenging due to the rapid attenuation of radio frequency and Global Positioning System signals. In addition, ALL systems can overcome some of the drawbacks in traditional localization techniques like SONAR and optical imaging.

The basic component of either a natural or artificial lateral line is a neuromast, a mechanoreceptive organ that allows the sensing of mechanical changes in water. Hair cells serve as the basic unit in flow and acoustic sensing. Some species (like arthropods) use a single hair cell for this function and other creatures like fish use a bundle of hair cells to achieve pointwise sensing. The fish lateral line consists of thousands of hair cells. In fish, a neuromast is a fine hair-like structure that uses transduction of rate coding to transmit the directionality of the signal. Each neuromast has a direction of maximum sensitivity providing directionality.

== Biomimetic features ==
=== Neuromast ===
In the artificial lateral line, neuromast's function is carried out by using transducers. These tiny structures employ various systems such as hot-wire anemometry, optoelectronics or piezoelectric cantilevers to detect mechanical changes in water. Neuromasts are primarily classified into two types based on their location. The superficial neuromast located on the skin is used for velocity sensing to locate certain moving targets, whereas Canal Neuromasts located below the epidermis enclosed in the canal utilize pressure gradient between the inlet and outlet for object detection and avoidance. Fishes use superficial neuromast for rheotaxis and station holding as well.

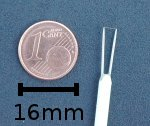
Simplified Hot-wire sensor

Out of all the sensing techniques employed, only hot-wire anemometry is non directional. This technique can accurately measure the particle motion in the medium but not the direction of flow. However hot wire anemometer and the data collected is adequate to determine particle motion up to hundreds of nanometers and as a result is comparable with a neuromast in similar flow. The figure is a depiction of a simplified hot-wire sensor. Current carrying conductors undergo increases in temperature due to Joule heating. The flow around the current carrying wire causes it to cool and the change in current required to restore the original temperature is the output. In another variant, the change in resistivity of the material with respect to the change in temperature of the hot wire is used at the output.

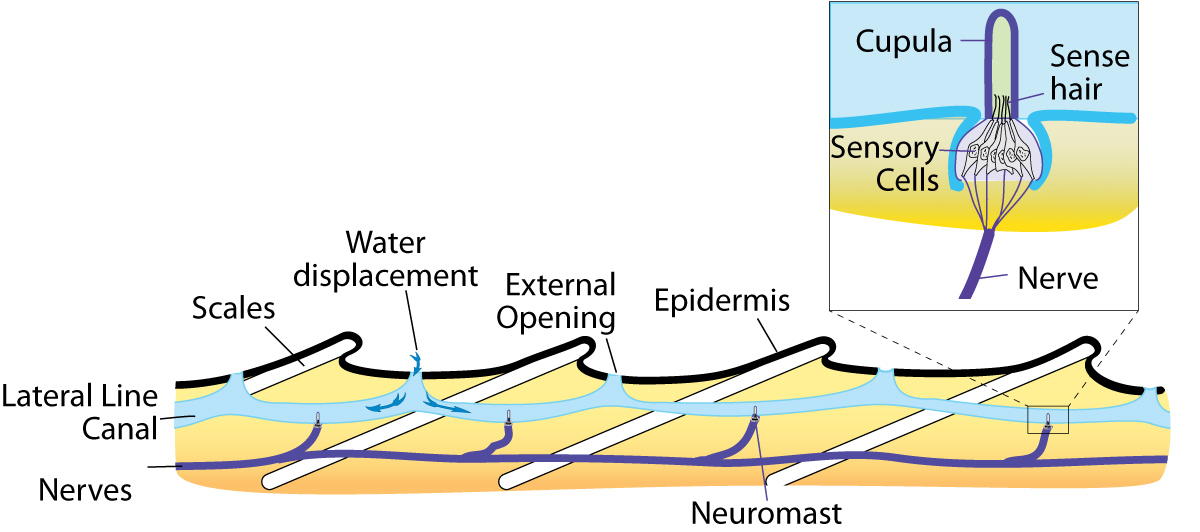
Figure 2: Sectional view of lateral line in fish and its components

=== Division of labor ===
There is a division of labor technique employed in these systems wherein superficial neuromasts located on the epidermis senses low frequencies as well as direct current (flow) while the canal neuromast located beneath the epidermis enclosed in canals detect alternating current using pressure gradients. In these systems wherein superficial neuromasts located on the epidermis sense low frequencies as well as direct current while the canal neuromast located beneath the epidermis enclosed in canals detect alternating current using pressure gradients

=== Cupula ===
Cupula is a gelatinous sack covering over hair like neuromast protruding from the skin. Cupula formed over neuromast is another feature that developed over time that provides a better response to the flow field. Cupular fibrils extend from the hair-like neuromast. Cupula helps attenuate low-frequency signals by virtue of its inertia and amplify higher frequency signals due to the leverage. In addition, these extended structures provide better sensitivity when the neuromast is submerged in the boundary layer. Recent studies uses drop casting, wherein dripping of HA-MA solution over the electrospun scaffolding to create a gravity driven prolate spheroid shaped cupula formation. Experimental comparison between the naked sensor and the newly developed sensor reveal positive results

=== Canals ===
Canal Neuromasts are enclosed in canals that run across the body. These canals filter out low-frequency flow that could saturate the system. A certain pattern is found in the concentration of neuromasts along the body among of aquatic species. The canal system is found to be running along the body in a single line that tend to branch out near the head. In fishes, the canal location is suggestive of the hydrodynamic information that is available during swimming. The exact placement of canals varies across species, a suggestive sign of functional role rather than developmental constraint

=== Canal distribution along the body ===
Commonly, the canal concentration peaks near the nose and drops significantly over the rest of the body. This trend is found in fish of varying sizes that occupy different habitats and across a variety of species. Some studies hypothesize the close connection between canal location and bone development and how they are morphologically constrained. The exact placement of canals varies across species and can be a suggestive sign of functional role rather than developmental constraint.

=== Canal flexibility ===
The flexibility of the canal system has a significant effect on low-frequency signal attenuation. The flexibility of the sensing element placed in the canal system may add to the sensitivity of the Canal Artificial Line (CALL) system. Experimental data proves that this factor creates a significant jump in the sensitivity of the system. Geometric improvements in the canal system and optimizing the sensing equipment for better results.

=== Constrictions in canals near neuromast ===
At higher pressure gradients, the voltage output of devices with wall constrictions near the sensors in the canal lateral line( CALL) were much more sensitive and according to Y Jiang, Z Ma, J Fu, et al their system could perceive a pressure gradient as low as 3.2 E−3 Pa/5 mm comparable to that of Cottus bairdii found in nature. Additionally, this feature attenuates low-frequency hydrodynamic signals.

== Applications ==
Navigation in shallow water bodies present a challenge especially for submersible vehicles. Flow fluctuations may adversely affect the trajectory of the craft making on-line detection and real time reaction an absolute necessity for adaptability.

Progress in the field of artificial lateral line has benefited various fields other than underwater navigation. A major example is the field of seismic imaging. The idea of selective frequency response in superficial neuromast has encouraged scientists to design new methods to develop seismic images of features under the ocean using half the data to generate images with higher resolution compared to traditional methods in addition to saving time required for processing

== Similar systems ==
Electrosensory lateral line (ELL) employs passive electrolocation except for certain groups of freshwater fish that utilize active electrolocation to emit and receive electric fields. It can be distinguished from LLS based on the acute difference in their operation besides similar roles

Integumentary Sensory Organs (ISO's) are other sensory dome-shaped organs found in the cranial region of crocodiles. It is a collection of sensory organs that can detect mechanical, ph and thermal changes. These mechanoreceptors are classified into two. The first of which is Slow Adapting receptors (SA) that sense steady flow. The second is Rapid Adapting receptors (RA) that sense oscillatory stimuli. ISO can potentially detect direction of disturbance with high accuracy in 3D space. Whiskers in harbor seal is another example. In addition some microorganisms use hydrodynamic imaging to predate.
