= Resonating device =

Vocal structure in animals

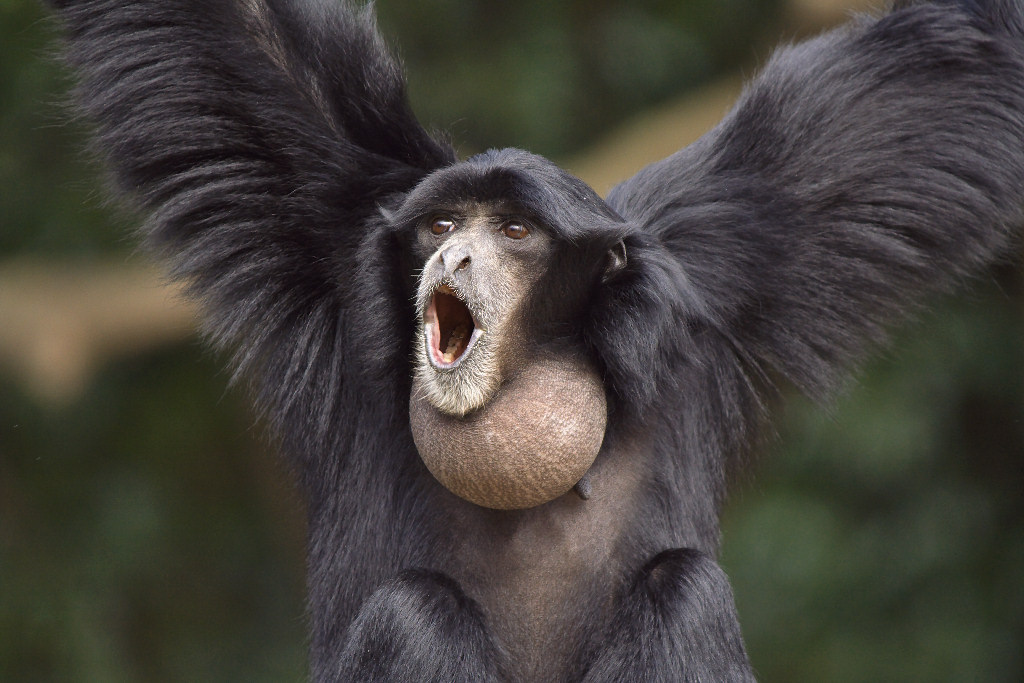
The gular sac of the siamang (Symphalangus syndactylus) is an example of a resonating chamber, here shown inflated mid-song

A resonating device is a structure used by an animal that improves the quality of its vocalizations through amplifying the sound produced via acoustic resonance. The benefit of such an adaptation is that the call's volume increases while lessening the necessary energy expenditure otherwise required to make such a sound. The resulting sound may also radiate more efficiently throughout the environment.

The resonator may take the form of a hollow (a resonant space), a chamber (referred to as a resonating chamber), or an otherwise air-filled cavity (such as an air sac) which may be part of, or adjacent to, the animal's sound-producing organ, or it may be a structure entirely outside of the animal's body (part of the environment). Such structures use a similar principle to wind instruments, in that both utilize a resonator to amplify the soundwave that will ultimately be uttered.

Such structures are widespread throughout the animal kingdom, as sound production is important in the social lives of various animals. Arthropods developed their resonating devices from various parts of their anatomy; bony fish often utilize their swim bladders as a resonating chamber; various tetrapods developed resonating devices in parts of their respiratory tract, and evidence suggests that dinosaurs possessed them as well. Vocalizations produced through zoological resonating devices act as mating calls, territorial calls, and other communication calls.

== In arthropods ==
=== Insects ===
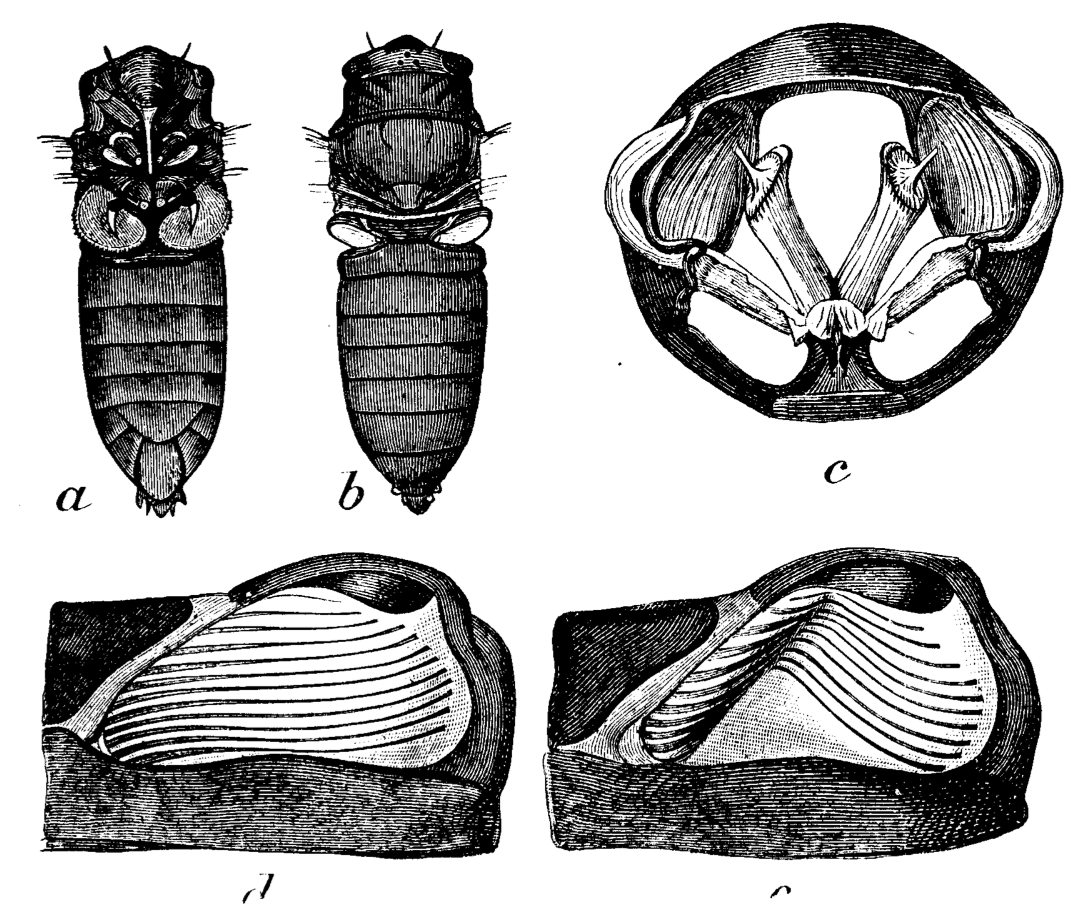
Anatomy of male cicada, including vocal organs

Cicadas produce songs as part of their courtship display; the males of a number of species possess an abdomen that is largely hollow. The sound producing organ, the tymbals, are connected to the abdomen, and as a consequence their calls are amplified significantly; cicadas have been recorded to emit sounds of around 100 decibels, which is enough to cause hearing loss after 15 minutes. A large australian species, Cyclochila australasiae, produces sounds of up to 120 decibels at close range. In contrast, the basal hairy cicadas (Tettigarcta) do not emit an audible, airborne sound; like related leafhoppers, they instead transmit their vibrations through their substrate, turning the plants they perch upon into resonators.

A species of aquatic bug, Micronecta scholtzi, has been recorded to produce sounds of 105 dB, the "highest ratio dB/body size". This sound is produced via stridulation of the paramere (genital appendage) on an abdominal ridge, and may be amplified by reflections and refractions within the layer of trapped air the bug uses as an air supply, though the use of the air bubble as such has not been proven.

Tree crickets (specifically, Oecanthus henryi) were found to create baffles by selecting appropriately sized leaves, then chewing a hole near the centre that was about the size of their wings. By calling from inside of these baffles, they were able to prevent acoustic short-circuiting and effectively increasing the loudness of its calls.

== In osteichthyans ==
Bony fish possess an air-filled organ called the swim bladder that is primarily used to regulate buoyancy. However, a number of species have adapted their swimbladders to be a part of a sound-producing organ. The sound-producing apparatus consists of fast-contracting striated muscles that vibrate the swim bladder, either entirely attached to the swimbladder or also attaching to adjacent structures like the vertebral column or occipital bones.

- The drums or croakers, family Sciaenidae, are named after the sounds that they produce through their specialized vocal apparati consisting of their swim bladder, which is surrounded by special sonic muscle fibers that vibrate against the resonant swim bladder.
- A number of catfish, including those in the families Doradidae and Pimelodidae, such as Platydoras and Pimelodus, also possess specialized drumming muscles attached to their swimbladders in order to produce sound.
- The minute cyprinids of the genus Danionella, such as Danionella cerebrum, are able to create sounds in excess of 140 decibels through a mechanism that "shoots" a drumming cartilage at the swimbladder at over 2000 g. This all occurs in a fish measuring up to 13.5 millimetres (0.53 in) in length, being one of the smallest extant vertebrates.

Other families of fish which have sound-generating mechanisms involving the swim bladder include:

- Mormyrids
- Characids
- Batrachoidids
- Triglids
- Gadids

== In amphibians ==
Frogs possess vocal sacs which serve to enhance their nuptial calls. To call, the frog closes its mouth, then expels air from its lungs, through its larynx, and into the vocal sac; the larynx's vibration causes the vocal sac to resonate. Additionally, some frogs may call from inside structures that further amplify their calls; Metaphrynella sundana call from inside tree hollows with water pooling at the bottom, tuning their own calls to the resonant frequency of their specific tree hollow. Mientien tree frogs (Kurixalus idiootocus) residing in urban areas utilize storm drains to improve their calls; frogs calling within the drains called louder and for longer periods.

== In amniotes ==
=== Mammals ===
==== Primates ====
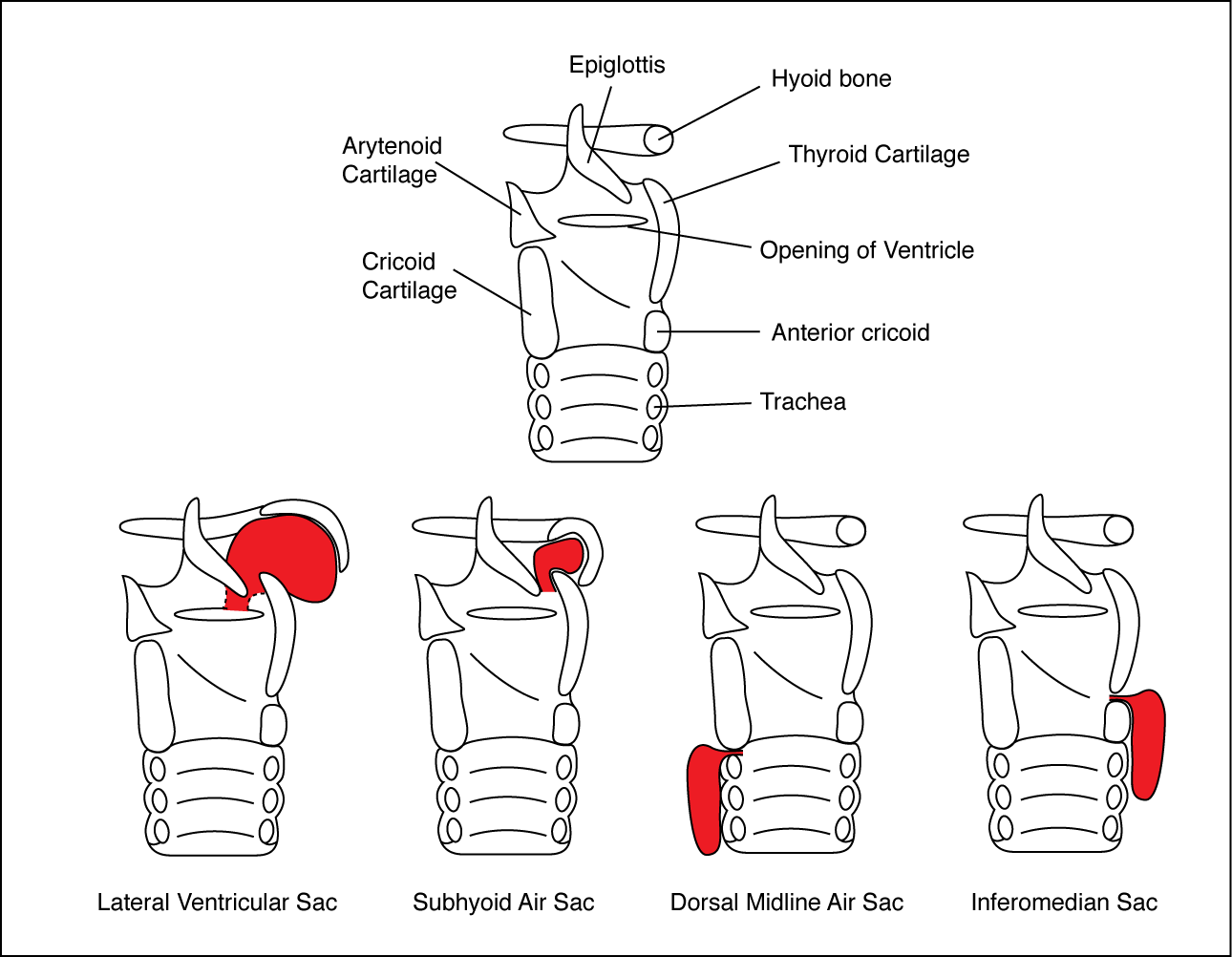
Laryngeal air sacs of nonhuman primates

The larynx is the primary vocal organ of mammals. In humans, it acts as a resonator only for high frequencies, due to its small volume; the pharynx, oral-, and nasal cavities, descending in order, are the most important resonators in humans.

Several non-human primates are adapted to producing loud calls, and they often rely on resonance chambers to produce it. The howler monkeys possess extralaryngeal airsacs along with a pneumatized (hollow) hyoid bone; it is suggested that the hollow hyoid acts as a resonating chamber, allowing the howler monkey to produce its namesake call. Gibbons are also well known for their loud territorial calls; the siamang has a particularly well developed gular sac that acts as a resonating chamber. Male orangutans also use their throat pouches for the purpose of enhancing their calls.

Male gorillas' airways have air sacs that penetrate into the soft tissue of the chest. These airsacs amplify the sound produced by his percussive chest-beating.

==== Laurasiatheres ====
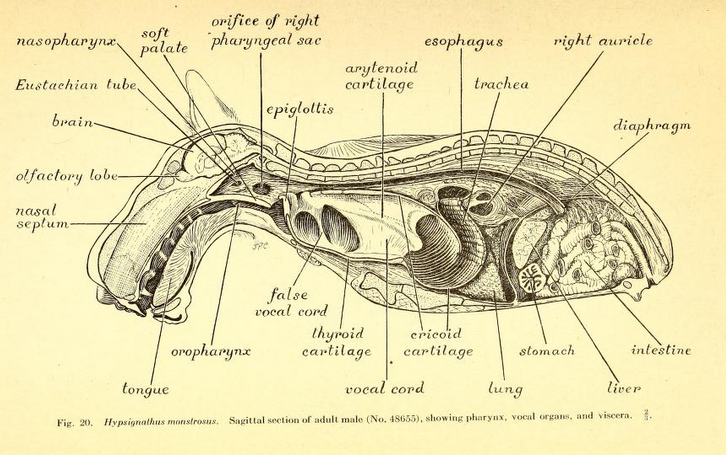
Internal organs of the hammerhead bat.

Horseshoe bats (of the family Rhinolophidae) are a bat genus that possess air pouches, or chambers, around their larynx which act as Helmholtz resonators. The male hammerhead bat has an extremely large larynx that extends through most of his thoracic cavity, displacing his other internal organs. A pharyngeal air sac connects to a large sinus in the bat's snout; these structures act as resonating chambers to further amplify the bat's voice. So specialized are these structures that scientists Herbert Lang and James Chapin remarked; "In no other mammal is everything so entirely subordinated to the organs of voice".

Pinnipeds have been noted to employ this structure; the expanded nasal chambers of elephant and hooded seals act as resonant spaces that enhance their calls. The expanded laryngeal lumen of California sea lions, the pharyngeal pouch of walrus, and the tracheal sacs of various phocids may also function in a similar manner.

Mysticetes, such as the blue whale, use their greatly expanded larynx as a resonant cavity. Even in juveniles, the larynx is bigger than either one of the whale's lungs. This organ, along with the nasal passages, act as resonant spaces that produce the signature drawn-out calls of the baleen whales.

=== Sauropsida ===
==== Crocodylians ====
The ghara of the indian gharial is a specialized organ that acts as a resonating chamber.

==== Lambeosaurines ====
The crests of a number of lambeosaurine dinosaurs have been hypothesized to act as resonating chambers; reconstructed upper airways, specifically, the nasal passages of Parasaurolophus, Lambeosaurus, Hypacrosaurus and Corythosaurus have been examined, and they were concluded to be able to enhance the vocalizations in life, and the different cranial crest shapes would have distinguished the sounds produced between genera.

==== Birds ====
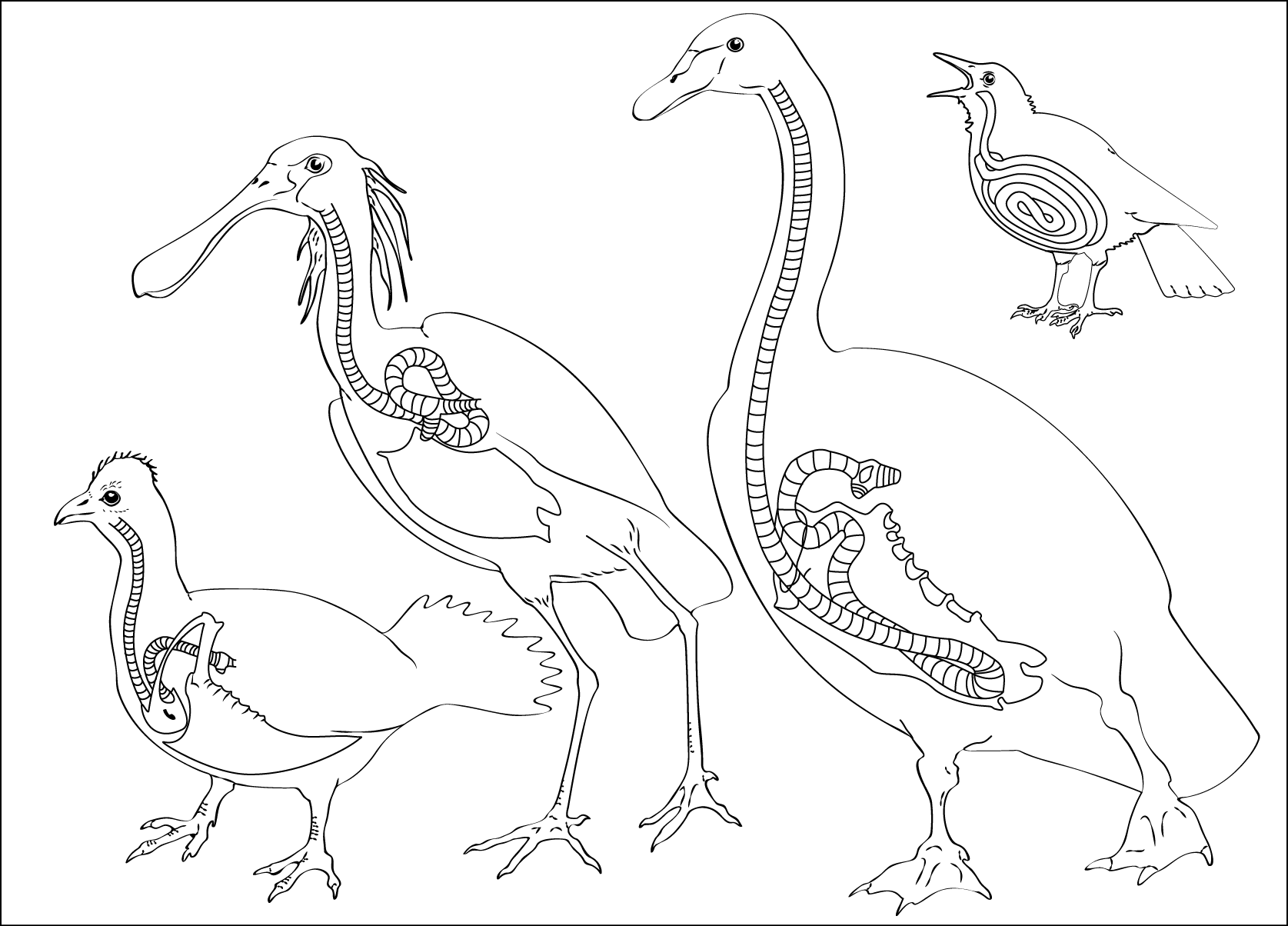
Birds exhibiting Tracheal Elongation (TE)

The avian syrinx is the primary vocal organ in most birds, with the trachea being the primary resonator in the system. In some birds, the trachea is grossly elongated, coiling or looping within the thorax; the trumpet manucode's trachea (pictured; top right) is 20 times longer than is predicted for birds of a comparable size. This condition of tracheal elongation (TE) is known in several orders of birds, and it seems to have evolved independently a number of times. W. T. Fitch hypothesizes that the function of such elongated trachea in birds may be to "exaggerate its apparent [body] size", through the lowering of the frequency (Hz) of its calls; larger individuals are preferentially selected as mates, and thus a "deeper" voice is selected for. Additionally, lower frequency calls travel farther, attracting mates from a wider area.

Additionally, the air sac system, which is part of the respiratory system in birds, may be an important resonator in certain birds, as is the inflated crop of columbiform pigeons and doves. The casques of hornbills may function as Helmholtz resonators, though do not seem to amplify the birds' calls; in at least Rhinoplax and Bucorvus it is thought that the throat pouch is the main resonating device.

Vocal organ in birds

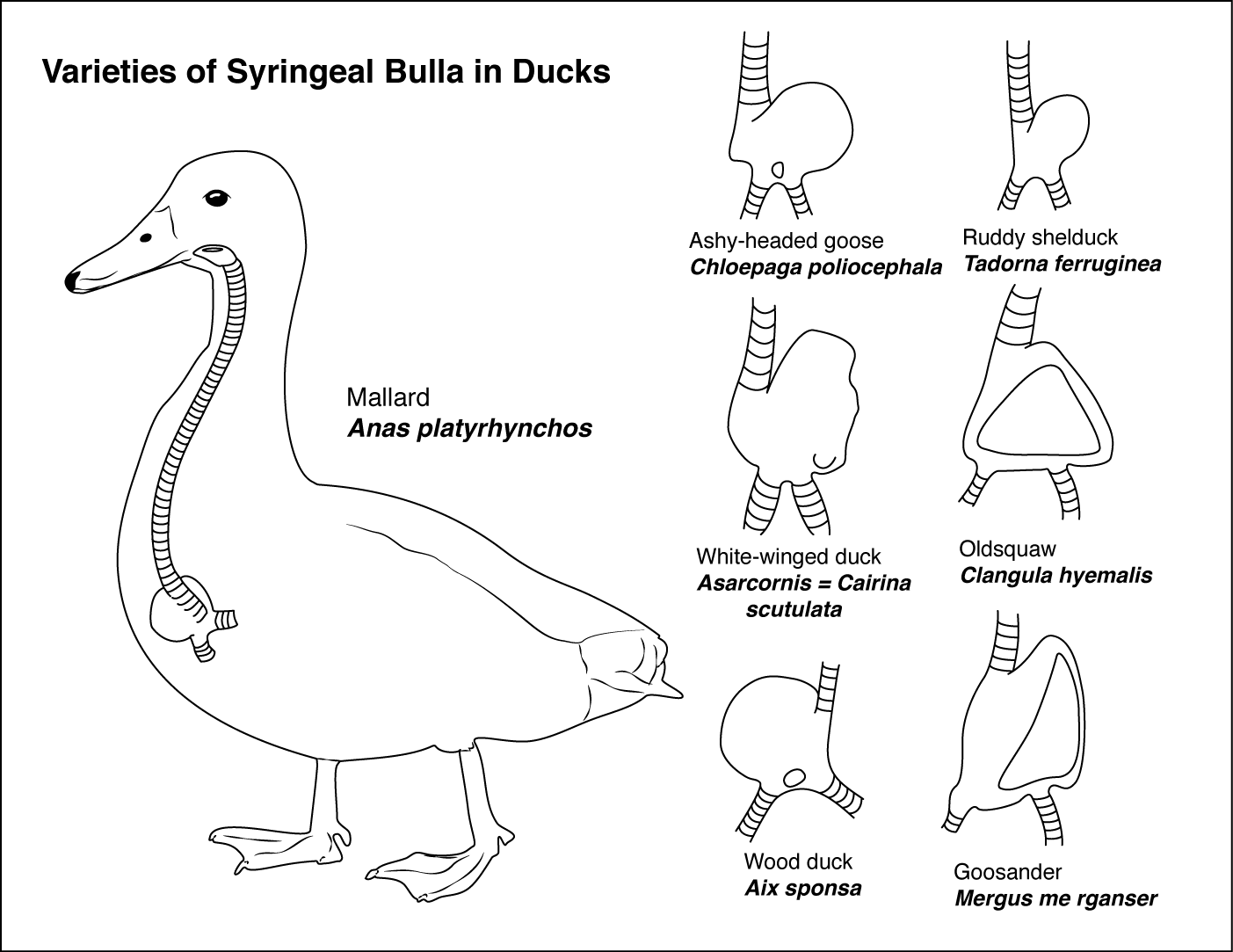
Syrinx of various ducks

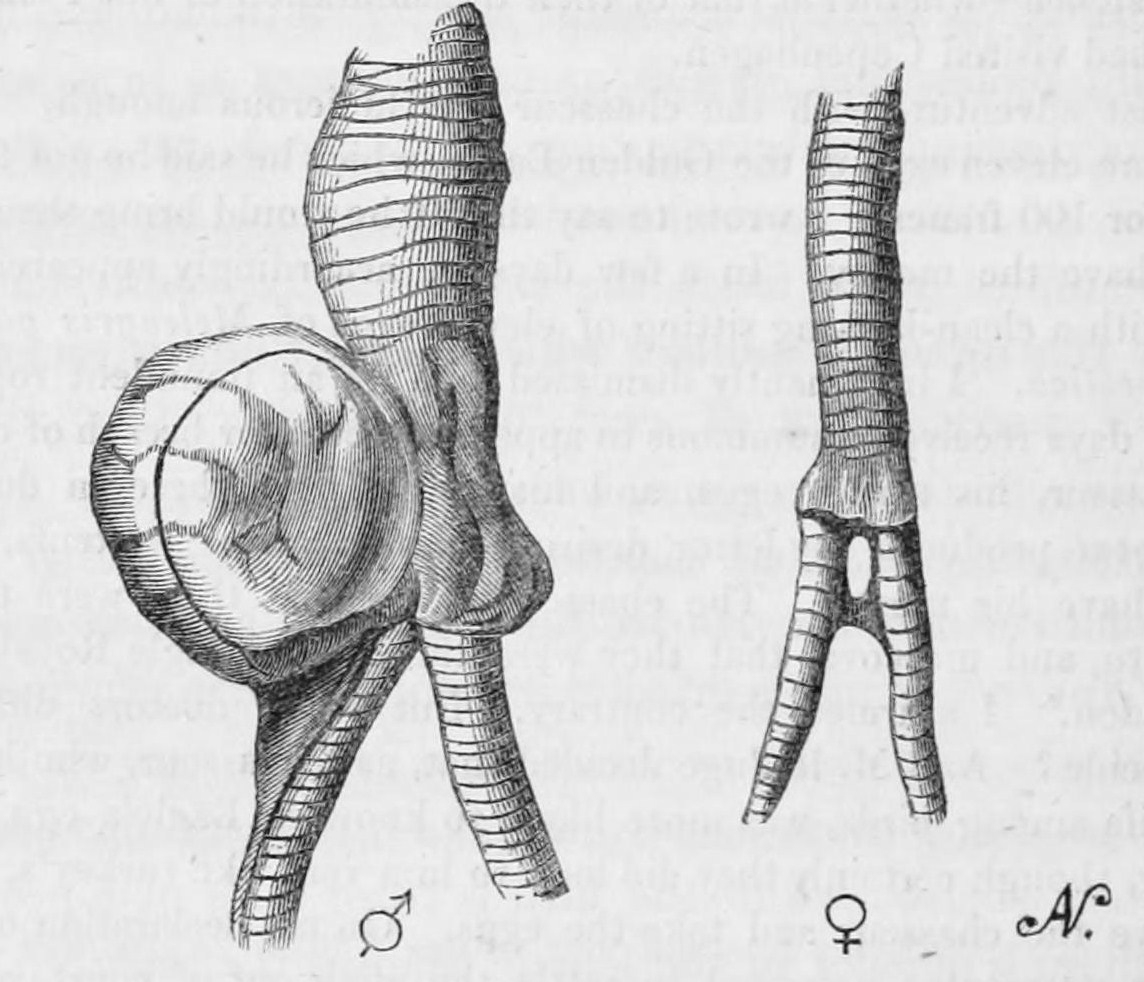
Sexual dimorphism in the syringial bulla of Histrionicus histrionicus, another duck

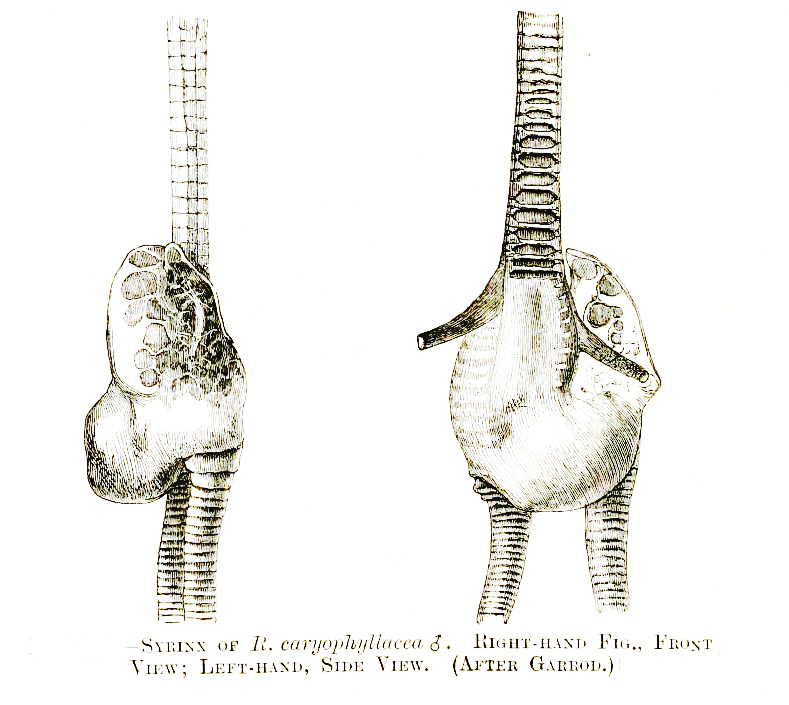
Syrinx of the possibly extinct pink-headed duck

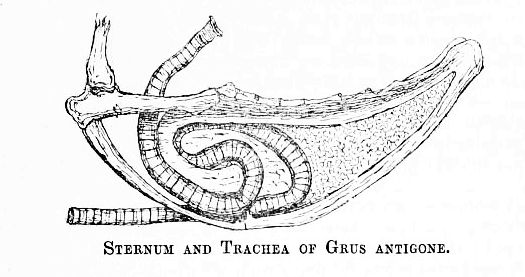
The complex looping trachea of the sarus crane, embedded within its sternum, produces the crane's signature trumpeting calls.

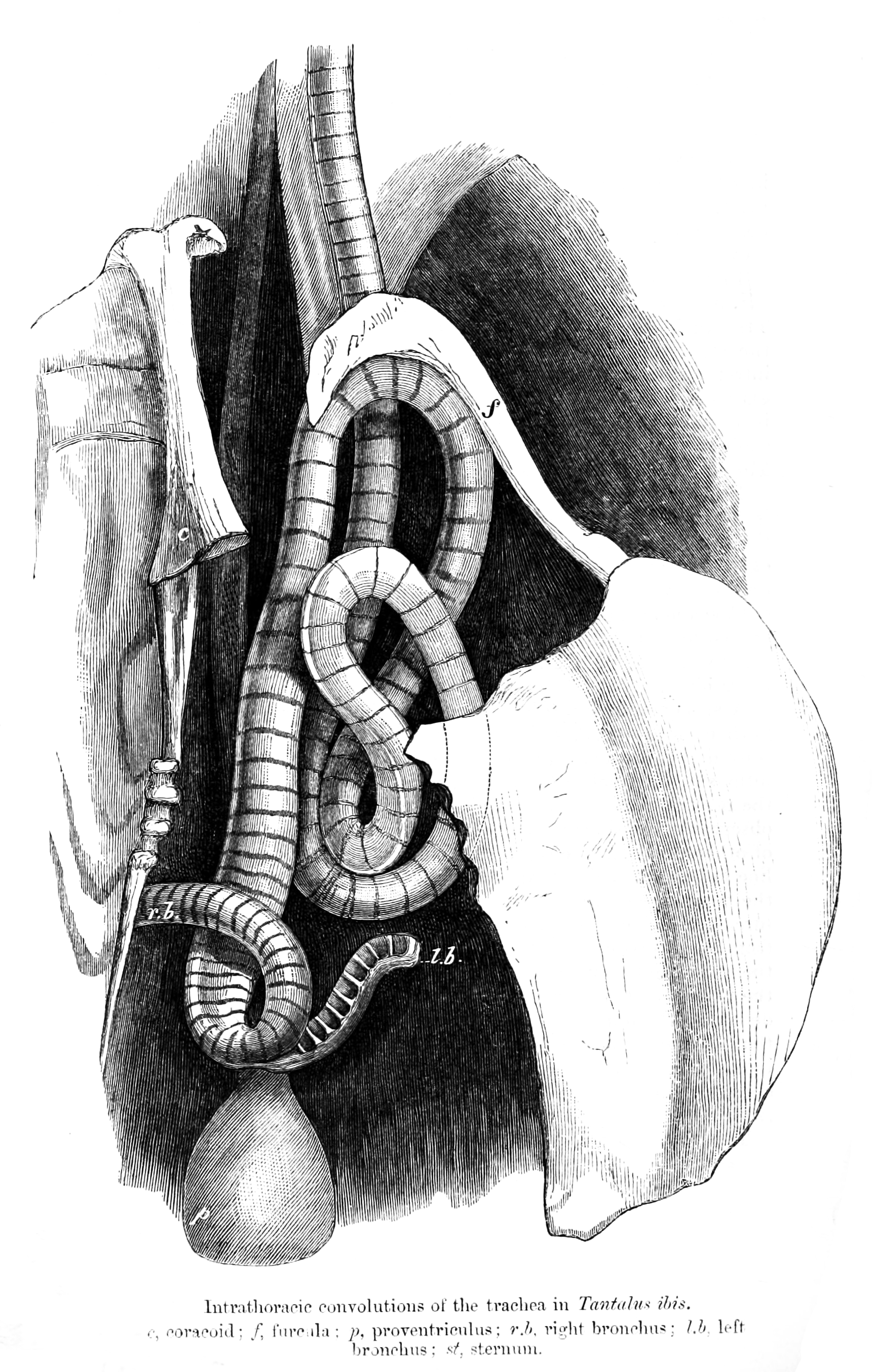
Looping trachea of the yellow-billed stork

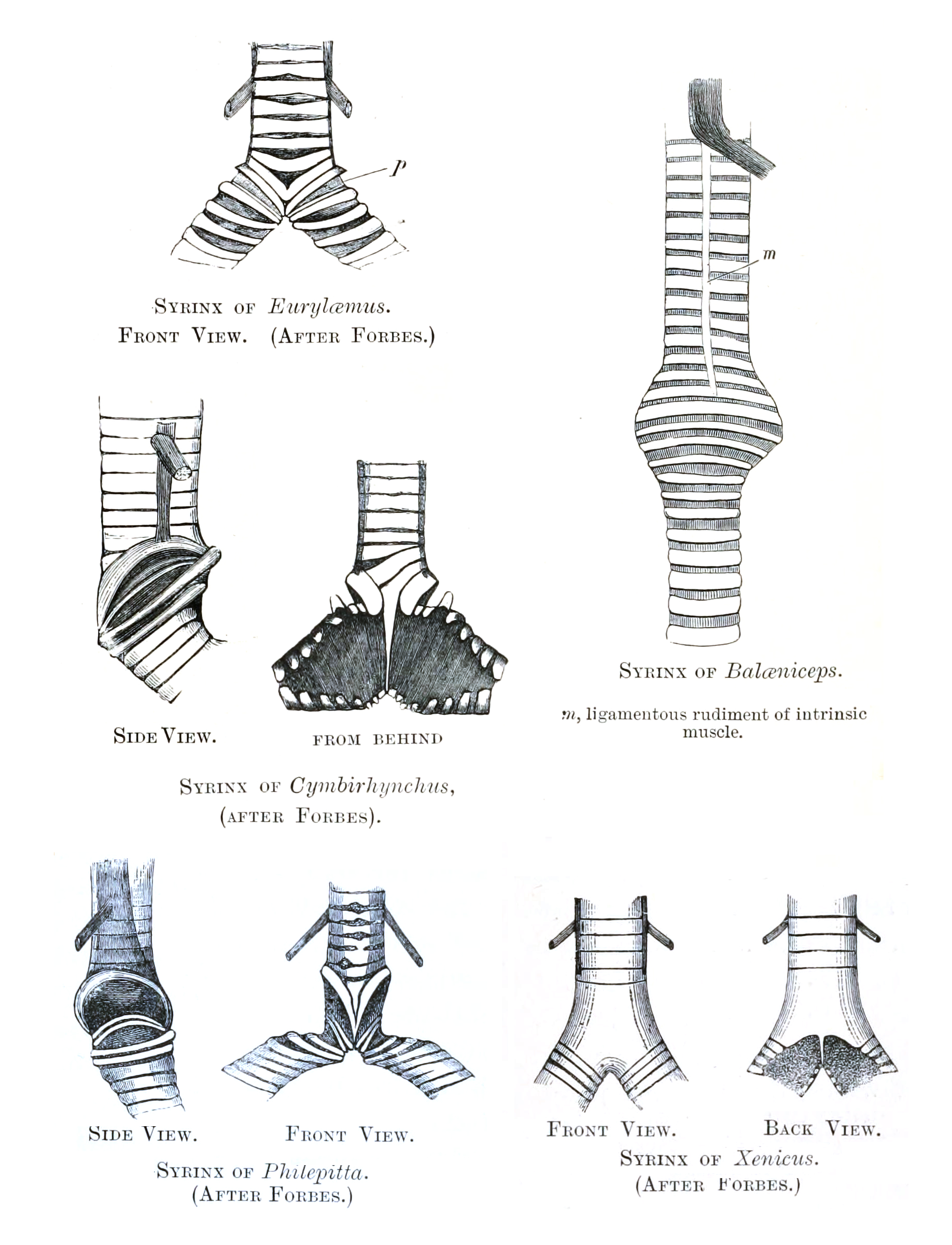
The syringes of various bird species

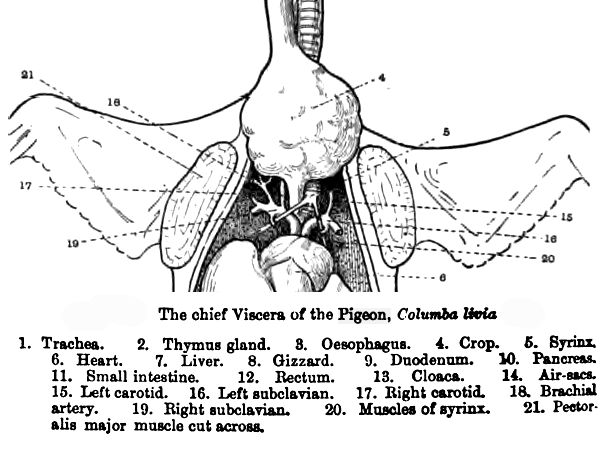
The crop of a pigeon (#4) is inflated when it coos, amplifying its call.
