= Acoustic short circuit =

Sound waves terms

An acoustic short circuit is a phenomenon in which sound waves interfere in such a way that both waves are canceled out. This occurs when the peak of one wave aligns with the trough of another, and the compressions and rarefactions of each wave neutralize each other. This occurs especially with improperly sealed loudspeakers, when the waves created on either side of the vibrating membrane are directly in opposition to each other.

== Loudspeakers ==
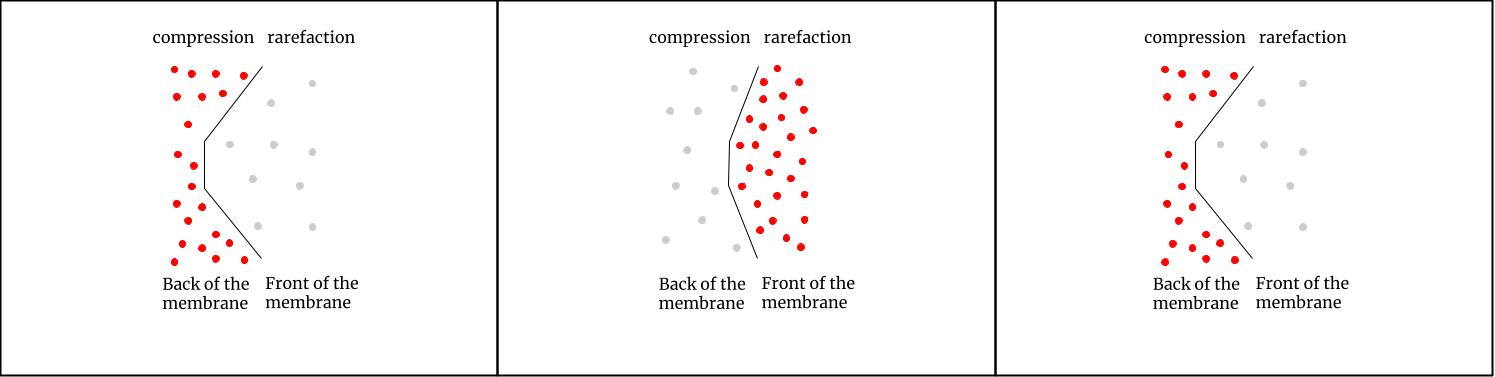
This diagram illustrates the compression of air by a loudspeaker's membrane. If the red compressed air is ever allowed to mix with the gray rarefied air, the air in the mixed region will return to normal density, and no sound wave will be emitted.

An engineering problem in the construction of loudspeakers is how to ensure that the sounds waves created behind the membrane do not cancel out the ones created in front. This means that the two waves must not interact while they are still in their current phases. There are two ways to ensure that this does not happen: sealing and baffling.

=== Sealing ===
As the name implies, sealing encloses the sound waves coming from the back of the speaker so that they cannot reach the sound waves in front. Sealing makes for a better articulated, more accurate sound, and requires less accuracy in construction, but does not play low notes with as much intensity or range.

=== Baffling ===
Baffling is the process of piping away the sound waves from the back of the membrane and thus preventing the waves from interfering. The tube down which these waves travel, or the baffle, is generally made of a thick, non-resonant material. Longer baffles protect more bass frequencies from cancelling, but baffles are somewhat imperfect: they often reinforce waves of some frequencies and fail to fully prevent others from negatively interfering with their counterparts from the front of the membrane.
