= Macrotristria dorsalis =

Scientific classification
- Kingdom: Animalia
- Phylum: Arthropoda
- Clade: Pancrustacea
- Class: Insecta
- Order: Hemiptera
- Suborder: Auchenorrhyncha
- Family: Cicadidae
- Genus: Macrotristria
- Species: M. dorsalis

Binomial name
- Macrotristria dorsalis Ashton, 1912

Species of cicada

Macrotristria dorsalis, also known as the little whiner, is a species of cicada in the true cicada family. It is endemic to Australia. It was described in 1912 by Australian entomologist Julian Howard Ashton

== Description ==
The length of the forewing is 31–38 mm. Adults may be either green or yellow-orange in colour.

== Distribution and habitat ==
The species occurs from Princess Charlotte Bay in Far North Queensland southwards to Innisfail and west to Georgetown. The syntype was collected at Kuranda. The habitat includes tropical bushland, open forest and eucalypt woodland.

== Behaviour ==
Adults are heard from December to March, clinging to the upper branches and trunks of eucalypts and other trees, uttering calls characterised by a continuous whine that develops a pulsing pattern.
