= Macrotristria doddi =

Scientific classification
- Kingdom: Animalia
- Phylum: Arthropoda
- Clade: Pancrustacea
- Class: Insecta
- Order: Hemiptera
- Suborder: Auchenorrhyncha
- Family: Cicadidae
- Genus: Macrotristria
- Species: M. doddi

Binomial name
- Macrotristria doddi Ashton, 1912

Species of cicada

Macrotristria doddi, also known as the Darwin whiner, is a species of cicada in the true cicada family. It is endemic to Australia. It was described in 1912 by Australian entomologist Julian Howard Ashton.

== Description ==
The length of the forewing is 46–61 mm.

== Distribution and habitat ==
The species occurs in the Top End of the Northern Territory. The holotype was collected at Darwin. The habitat includes tropical bushland and monsoon thickets, as well as parks and gardens.

== Behaviour ==
Adults are heard from November to February, clinging to the upper branches and main trunks of eucalypts, uttering calls characterised by a series of loud crackling phrases followed by a long drone.
