= Macrotristria stevewilsoni =

Scientific classification
- Kingdom: Animalia
- Phylum: Arthropoda
- Clade: Pancrustacea
- Class: Insecta
- Order: Hemiptera
- Suborder: Auchenorrhyncha
- Family: Cicadidae
- Genus: Macrotristria
- Species: M. stevewilsoni

Binomial name
- Macrotristria stevewilsoni Popple, 2016

Species of cicada

Macrotristria stevewilsoni, also known as the Shoalwater cherrynose, is a species of cicada in the true cicada family. It is endemic to Australia. It was described in 2016 by Australian entomologist Lindsay Popple.

== Description ==
The length of the forewing is 46–52 mm.

== Distribution and habitat ==
The species is known only from the Shoalwater Bay Military Training Area on the Capricorn Coast of Central Queensland. The holotype was collected some 4.5 km north-west of Cliff Point. The associated habitat includes coastal scrub and bushland with Acacia aulacocarpa and Melaleuca dealbata.

== Behaviour ==
Adults are heard from November to February, clinging to the trunks and upper branches of the vegetation, uttering calls characterised by a series of pulses developing into a strong whine.
