= Macrotristria frenchi =

Scientific classification
- Kingdom: Animalia
- Phylum: Arthropoda
- Clade: Pancrustacea
- Class: Insecta
- Order: Hemiptera
- Suborder: Auchenorrhyncha
- Family: Cicadidae
- Genus: Macrotristria
- Species: M. frenchi

Binomial name
- Macrotristria frenchi Ashton, 1914

Species of cicada

Macrotristria frenchi, also known as the northern steamer, is a species of cicada in the true cicada family. It is endemic to Australia. It was described in 1914 by Australian entomologist Julian Howard Ashton

== Description ==
The length of the forewing is 41–48 mm.

== Distribution and habitat ==
The species occurs in the Top End of the Northern Territory. The syntype was collected at the Katherine River. The habitat includes riverine woodland.

== Behaviour ==
Adults are heard from November to February, clinging to the upper branches and trunks of eucalypts, acacias and pandans, uttering strong pulsing calls.
