= Macrotristria maculicollis =

Scientific classification
- Kingdom: Animalia
- Phylum: Arthropoda
- Clade: Pancrustacea
- Class: Insecta
- Order: Hemiptera
- Suborder: Auchenorrhyncha
- Family: Cicadidae
- Genus: Macrotristria
- Species: M. maculicollis

Binomial name
- Macrotristria maculicollis Ashton, 1914

Species of cicada

Macrotristria maculicollis, also known as the false cherrynose, is a species of cicada in the true cicada family. It is endemic to Australia. It was described in 1914 by Australian entomologist Julian Howard Ashton

== Description ==
The length of the forewing is 45–52 mm.

== Distribution and habitat ==
The species occurs from the Connors River in inland Central Queensland southwards to the Pilliga Scrub in northern New South Wales. The syntype was collected at Dalby. The habitat includes brigalow and eucalypt woodland.

== Behaviour ==
Adults are heard from November to March, clinging to the upper branches of trees, uttering calls characterised by an alarm-like scream followed by a series of shrill pulses.
