= Macrotristria thophoides =

Scientific classification
- Kingdom: Animalia
- Phylum: Arthropoda
- Clade: Pancrustacea
- Class: Insecta
- Order: Hemiptera
- Suborder: Auchenorrhyncha
- Family: Cicadidae
- Genus: Macrotristria
- Species: M. thophoides

Binomial name
- Macrotristria thophoides Ashton, 1914

Species of cicada

Macrotristria thophoides, also known as the false drummer, is a species of cicada in the true cicada family. It is endemic to Australia. It was described in 1914 by Australian entomologist Julian Howard Ashton

== Description ==
The length of the forewing is 46–58 mm.

== Distribution and habitat ==
The species occurs in Western Australia from the Gascoyne River southwards to Yalgoo and Norseman. The syntype was collected at Norseman. The habitat includes low, open shrubland.

== Behaviour ==
Adults are heard from January to February, clinging to low trees in local aggregations, uttering loud metallic whines.
