= Parnquila magna =

Scientific classification
- Kingdom: Animalia
- Phylum: Arthropoda
- Clade: Pancrustacea
- Class: Insecta
- Order: Hemiptera
- Suborder: Auchenorrhyncha
- Family: Cicadidae
- Genus: Parnquila
- Species: P. magna

Binomial name
- Parnquila magna (Distant, 1913)

Synonyms
- Parnkalla magna Distant, 1913

Species of cicada

Parnquila magna, also known as the goldfields buzzer, is a species of cicada in the true cicada family. It is endemic to Australia. It was described in 1913 by English entomologist William Lucas Distant.

== Description ==
The length of the forewing is 21–26 mm.

== Distribution and habitat ==
The species occurs in central Western Australia between Menzies, Wiluna and Cue. The syntype was collected at Cue. The associated habitat is arid shrubland and woodland with scattered mallee.

== Behaviour ==
The cicadas are xylem feeders. Adults are heard from January to March, clinging to the stems of woody shrubs, uttering persistent, buzzing calls.
