= Parnquila unicolor =

Scientific classification
- Kingdom: Animalia
- Phylum: Arthropoda
- Clade: Pancrustacea
- Class: Insecta
- Order: Hemiptera
- Suborder: Auchenorrhyncha
- Family: Cicadidae
- Genus: Parnquila
- Species: P. unicolor

Binomial name
- Parnquila unicolor (Ashton, 1921)

Synonyms
- Arenopsaltria unicolor Ashton, 1921

Species of cicada

Parnquila unicolor, also known as the Perth buzzer, is a species of cicada in the true cicada family. It is endemic to Australia. It was described in 1921 by Australian entomologist Julian Howard Ashton.

== Description ==
The length of the forewing is 20–29 mm.

== Distribution and habitat ==
The species occurs in the Greater Perth region of south-west Western Australia. The associated habitat is low open forest with heath.

== Behaviour ==
The cicadas are xylem feeders. Adults are heard while clinging to the stems and foliage of low vegetation, uttering strong, buzzing calls.
