= Jassopsaltria cinnamomea =

Scientific classification
- Kingdom: Animalia
- Phylum: Arthropoda
- Clade: Pancrustacea
- Class: Insecta
- Order: Hemiptera
- Suborder: Auchenorrhyncha
- Family: Cicadidae
- Genus: Jassopsaltria
- Species: J. cinnamomea

Binomial name
- Jassopsaltria cinnamomea Moulds & Marshall, 2021

Species of cicada

Jassopsaltria cinnamomea, also known as the red bluff fizzer, is a species of cicada in the true cicada family. It is endemic to Australia. It was described in 2021 by Australian entomologists Maxwell Sydney Moulds and David Marshall.

== Description ==
The forewing length is 14–16 mm.

== Distribution and habitat ==
The species occurs in coastal Western Australia, between Kalbarri and Eneabba, in the Geraldton Sandplains bioregion. The holotype was collected some 16 km east of Eneabba. The cicadas are found in open shrubland habitats.

== Behaviour ==
Adults have been heard from November to January, clinging to the branches of shrubs such as Acacia, uttering continuous, whistle-like, buzzing calls.
