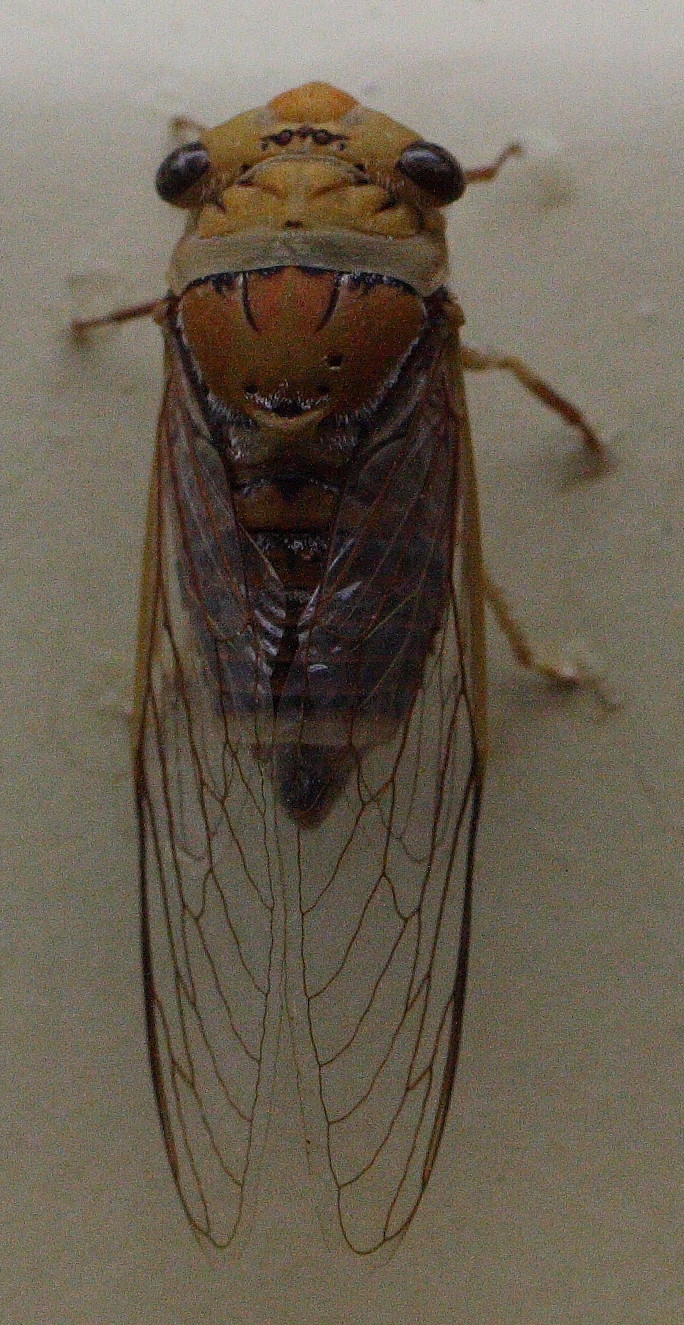

Scientific classification
- Kingdom: Animalia
- Phylum: Arthropoda
- Clade: Pancrustacea
- Class: Insecta
- Order: Hemiptera
- Suborder: Auchenorrhyncha
- Family: Cicadidae
- Genus: Macrotristria
- Species: M. intersecta

Binomial name
- Macrotristria intersecta (Walker, 1850)

Synonyms
- Fidicina intersecta Walker, 1850; Fidicina internata Walker, 1850; Fidicina prasina Walker, 1850; Cicada sylvanella Goding & Froggatt, 1904

= Macrotristria intersecta =

Species of cicada

Macrotristria intersecta, also known as the corroboree cicada (dark form) or green whizzer (green form), is a species of cicada in the true cicada family. It is endemic to Australia. It was described in 1850 by English entomologist Francis Walker.

== Description ==
The length of the forewing is 31–43 mm. Colours may vary from black to brown, orange and green.

== Distribution and habitat ==
The species occurs across northern Australia from the Kimberley region of far north Western Australia and the Top End of the Northern Territory to northern Queensland. The habitat includes tropical bushland, open forest, woodland and parkland.

== Behaviour ==
Adults are heard from September to February, clinging to the stems and branches of trees and shrubs, uttering calls characterised by a harsh, fizzing whine, at first continuous but then developing a pulsing component.
