= Macrotristria lachlani =

Scientific classification
- Kingdom: Animalia
- Phylum: Arthropoda
- Clade: Pancrustacea
- Class: Insecta
- Order: Hemiptera
- Suborder: Auchenorrhyncha
- Family: Cicadidae
- Genus: Macrotristria
- Species: M. lachlani

Binomial name
- Macrotristria lachlani Moulds, 1992

Species of cicada

Macrotristria lachlani, also known as the Cape York cherrynose, is a species of cicada in the true cicada family. It is endemic to Australia. It was described in 1992 by Australian entomologist Maxwell Sydney Moulds.

== Etymology ==
The specific epithet lachlani honours Robert Lachlan who collected the original specimens.

== Description ==
The length of the forewing is 42–47 mm.

== Distribution and habitat ==
The species is known only from the Cape York Peninsula of Far North Queensland. The holotype was collected just south of the Hann River crossing, 80 km north-west of Laura. The associated habitat includes open forest and tropical eucalypt woodland.

== Behaviour ==
Adults are heard from October to February, clinging to the trunks and upper branches of the eucalypts, especially Eucalyptus tetrodonta, uttering loud whining calls.
