= Parnquila hillieri =

Scientific classification
- Kingdom: Animalia
- Phylum: Arthropoda
- Clade: Pancrustacea
- Class: Insecta
- Order: Hemiptera
- Suborder: Auchenorrhyncha
- Family: Cicadidae
- Genus: Parnquila
- Species: P. hillieri

Binomial name
- Parnquila hillieri (Distant, 1906)

Synonyms
- Burbunga hillieri Distant, 1906

Species of cicada

Parnquila hillieri, also known as the cane grass buzzer, is a species of cicada in the true cicada family. It is endemic to Australia. It was described in 1906 by English entomologist William Lucas Distant.

== Description ==
The length of the forewing is 23–27 mm.

== Distribution and habitat ==
The species occurs in north-eastern South Australia in the Strzelecki Desert. The holotype was collected at Killalpanima, some 160 km east of Lake Eyre. The associated habitat is sandhill canegrass growing in thick shrub-like clumps on sand-dunes.

== Behaviour ==
Adults have been heard in January, clinging to canegrass stems, uttering persistent, buzzing calls.
