= Anapsaltoda =

Scientific classification
- Kingdom: Animalia
- Phylum: Arthropoda
- Clade: Pancrustacea
- Class: Insecta
- Order: Hemiptera
- Suborder: Auchenorrhyncha
- Infraorder: Cicadomorpha
- Superfamily: Cicadoidea
- Family: Cicadidae
- Subfamily: Cicadinae
- Genus: Anapsaltoda; Ashton, 1921

Genus of cicadas

Anapsaltoda is a genus of cicadas, commonly known as emperors, in the family Cicadidae, that is endemic to Australia. It was described in 1921 by Australian entomologist Julian Howard Ashton.

== Species ==
There are two species in the genus:

- Anapsaltoda cowanae Moulds & Popple, 2023
- Anapsaltoda pulchra (Ashton, 1921)
