= Samaecicada subolivacea =

Scientific classification
- Kingdom: Animalia
- Phylum: Arthropoda
- Clade: Pancrustacea
- Class: Insecta
- Order: Hemiptera
- Suborder: Auchenorrhyncha
- Family: Cicadidae
- Genus: Samaecicada
- Species: S. subolivacea

Binomial name
- Samaecicada subolivacea (Ashton, 1912)

Synonyms
- Pauropsalta subolivacea Ashton, 1912

Species of cicada

Samaecicada subolivacea is a species of cicada, also known as the red-eyed fairy, in the true cicada family, Cicadettinae subfamily and Cicadettini tribe. The species is endemic to Australia. It was described in 1912 by Australian entomologist Julian Howard Ashton.

== Description ==
The length of the forewing is 13–16 mm.

== Distribution and habitat ==
The species occurs in the Hawkesbury Sandstone region of New South Wales, encompassing Greater Sydney and the Blue Mountains, southwards to Nowra. The associated habitat is open heathy woodland. The cicadas are known to occupy Hakea shrubs.

== Behaviour ==
Adult males may be heard from December to March, emitting rapid ticking calls.
