= Macrotristria monteithi =

Scientific classification
- Kingdom: Animalia
- Phylum: Arthropoda
- Clade: Pancrustacea
- Class: Insecta
- Order: Hemiptera
- Suborder: Auchenorrhyncha
- Family: Cicadidae
- Genus: Macrotristria
- Species: M. monteithi

Binomial name
- Macrotristria monteithi Moulds, 2022

Species of cicada

Macrotristria monteithi, also known as the Maranoa cherrynose, is a species of cicada in the true cicada family. It is endemic to Australia. It was described in 2022 by Australian entomologist Maxwell Sydney Moulds.

== Description ==
The length of the forewing is 54–62 mm.

== Distribution and habitat ==
The species is known only from the vicinity of Carnarvon and Expedition National Parks in the Maranoa Region of Central Queensland. The holotype was collected at Mount Moffatt. The associated habitat is eucalypt woodland.

== Behaviour ==
Adults are heard from December to February, clinging to the trunks and upper branches of the eucalypts, uttering strong, penetrating, whining calls.
