= Jassopsaltria rufifacies =

Scientific classification
- Kingdom: Animalia
- Phylum: Arthropoda
- Clade: Pancrustacea
- Class: Insecta
- Order: Hemiptera
- Suborder: Auchenorrhyncha
- Family: Cicadidae
- Genus: Jassopsaltria
- Species: J. rufifacies

Binomial name
- Jassopsaltria rufifacies Ashton, 1914

Species of cicada

Jassopsaltria rufifacies, also known as the green fizzer, is a species of cicada in the true cicada family. It is endemic to Australia. It was described in 1914 by Australian entomologist Julian Howard Ashton.

== Description ==
The forewing length is 13–17 mm.

== Distribution and habitat ==
The species occurs in Western Australia, where it has been recorded from the Avon Wheatbelt, Geraldton Sandplains, Jarrah Forest and Swan Coastal Plain bioregions It is found in low shrubland habitats.

== Behaviour ==
Adults have been heard in January, February and May, clinging to the branches of shrubs such as Acacia, Baeckea and Dryandra, uttering continuous, buzzing calls.
