= Macrotristria kathhillodes =

Scientific classification
- Kingdom: Animalia
- Phylum: Arthropoda
- Clade: Pancrustacea
- Class: Insecta
- Order: Hemiptera
- Suborder: Auchenorrhyncha
- Family: Cicadidae
- Genus: Macrotristria
- Species: M. kathhillodes

Binomial name
- Macrotristria kathhillodes Olive, 2022

Species of cicada

Macrotristria kathhillodes, also known as the deafening cherrynose, is a species of cicada in the true cicada family. It is endemic to Australia. It was described in 2022 by Australian entomologist John C. Olive.

== Description ==
The length of the forewing is 48–64 mm.

== Distribution and habitat ==
The species occurs in Queensland from Herberton southwards to Nebo and Mount Moffatt. The habitat includes sclerophyll forest, especially riparian areas. The holotype was collected at Herberton.

== Behaviour ==
Adults are heard from November to February, clinging high to the upper branches of eucalypts, uttering loud, piercing screams that carry for large distances.
