= Jassopsaltria =

Scientific classification
- Kingdom: Animalia
- Phylum: Arthropoda
- Class: Insecta
- Order: Hemiptera
- Suborder: Auchenorrhyncha
- Superfamily: Cicadoidea
- Family: Cicadidae
- Subfamily: Cicadinae
- Tribe: Jassopsaltriini
- Genus: Jassopsaltria; Ashton, 1914

Genus of true bugs

Jassopsaltria is a genus of cicadas, also known as fizzers, in the family Cicadidae, found in Australia. It is the only genus in the tribe Jassopsaltriini.

== Species ==
As of 2025 there were six described species:

- Jassopsaltria aeroides Moulds & Marshall, 2021 (Shark Bay Fizzer)
- Jassopsaltria cinnamomea Moulds & Marshall, 2021 (Red Bluff Fizzer)
- Jassopsaltria danielsorum Moulds & Marshall, 2021 (Keep River Fizzer)
- Jassopsaltria gracilens Moulds & Marshall, 2021 (Caramel Fizzer)
- Jassopsaltria minilyaensis Moulds & Marshall, 2021 (Minilya Fizzer)
- Jassopsaltria rufifacies Ashton, 1914 (Green Fizzer)
