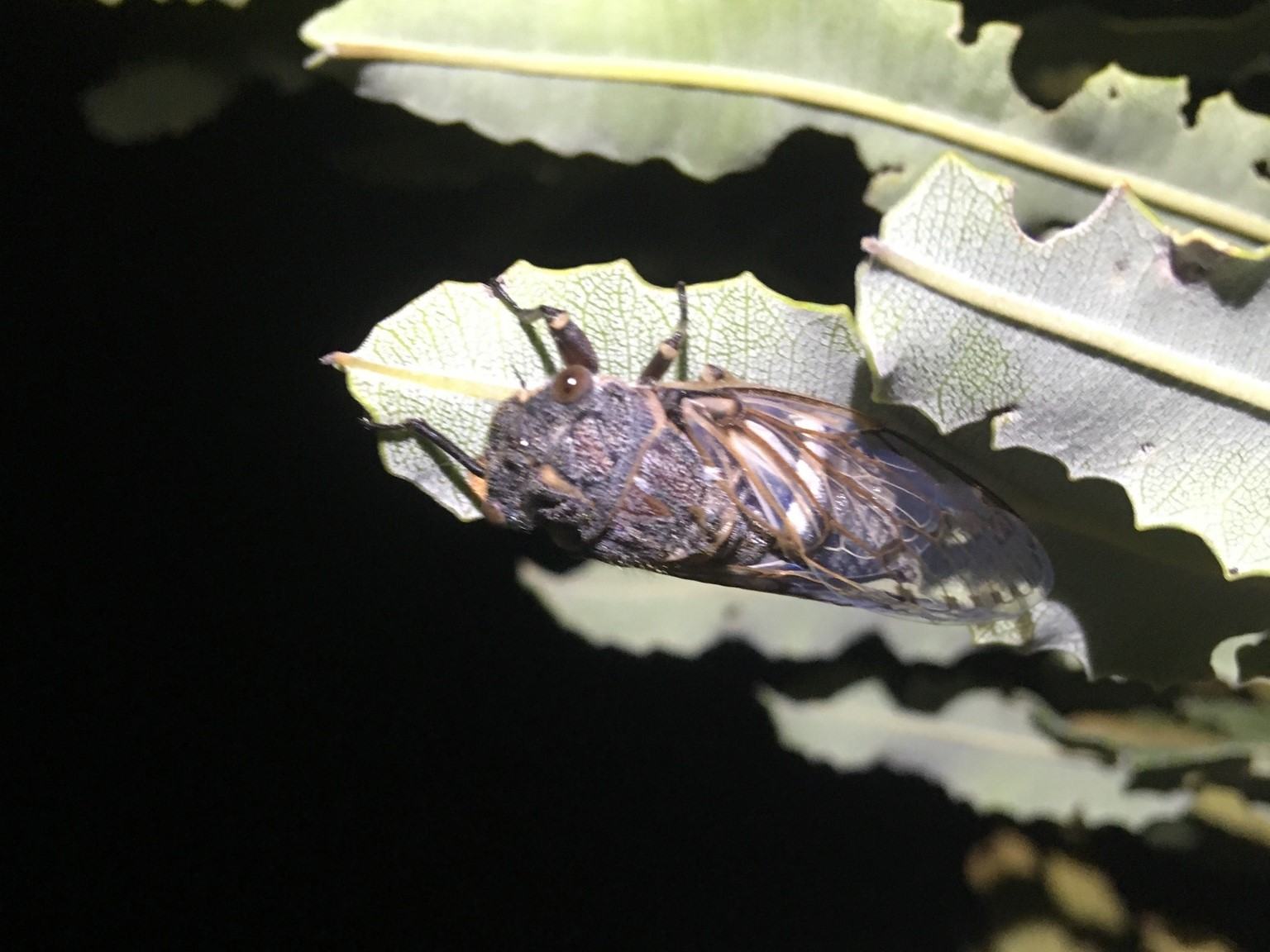
- Arenopsaltria fullo

Scientific classification
- Kingdom: Animalia
- Phylum: Arthropoda
- Class: Insecta
- Order: Hemiptera
- Suborder: Auchenorrhyncha
- Family: Cicadidae
- Subfamily: Cicadinae
- Tribe: Arenopsaltriini
- Genus: Arenopsaltria; Ashton, 1921

= Arenopsaltria =

Genus of insects

Arenopsaltria is a genus of cicadas, commonly known as sandgrinders, belonging to the family Cicadidae. The species of this genus are found in Australia.

== Species ==
- Arenopsaltria dryas Moulds & Marshall, 2025
- Arenopsaltria exmouthensis Moulds & Marshall, 2025
- Arenopsaltria fullo (F.Walker, 1850)
- Arenopsaltria nubivena (F.Walker, 1858)
- Arenopsaltria pygmaea (Distant, 1904)
