= Jassopsaltria aeroides =

Scientific classification
- Kingdom: Animalia
- Phylum: Arthropoda
- Clade: Pancrustacea
- Class: Insecta
- Order: Hemiptera
- Suborder: Auchenorrhyncha
- Family: Cicadidae
- Genus: Jassopsaltria
- Species: J. aeroides

Binomial name
- Jassopsaltria aeroides Moulds & Marshall, 2021

Species of cicada

Jassopsaltria aeroides, also known as the blue-eyed fizzer, is a species of cicada in the true cicada family. It is endemic to Australia. It was described in 2021 by Australian entomologists Maxwell Sydney Moulds and David Marshall.

== Description ==
The forewing length is 17–19 mm.

== Distribution and habitat ==
The species occurs in central western Western Australia, north of Shark Bay, in the Carnarvon bioregion. The holotype was collected some 43 km north of the Overlander Roadhouse. The cicadas are found in open shrubland habitats.

== Behaviour ==
Adults have been heard from January to February, clinging to the branches of shrubs such as Acacia, uttering continuous, buzzing calls.
