= Jassopsaltria minilyaensis =

Scientific classification
- Kingdom: Animalia
- Phylum: Arthropoda
- Clade: Pancrustacea
- Class: Insecta
- Order: Hemiptera
- Suborder: Auchenorrhyncha
- Family: Cicadidae
- Genus: Jassopsaltria
- Species: J. minilyaensis

Binomial name
- Jassopsaltria minilyaensis Moulds & Marshall, 2021

Species of cicada

Jassopsaltria minilyaensis, also known as the Minilya fizzer, is a species of cicada in the true cicada family. It is endemic to Australia. It was described in 2021 by Australian entomologists Maxwell Sydney Moulds and David Marshall.

== Description ==
The forewing length is 15–18 mm.

== Distribution and habitat ==
The species occurs in central-western Western Australia, in the Carnarvon bioregion. The holotype was collected 36 km south of the Minilya Roadhouse. The habitat is open shrubland.

== Behaviour ==
Adults have been heard from December to February, clinging to the branches of shrubs such as Acacia, uttering continuous, shivering, buzzing calls.
