= Macrotristria vittata =

Scientific classification
- Kingdom: Animalia
- Phylum: Arthropoda
- Clade: Pancrustacea
- Class: Insecta
- Order: Hemiptera
- Suborder: Auchenorrhyncha
- Family: Cicadidae
- Genus: Macrotristria
- Species: M. vittata

Binomial name
- Macrotristria vittata Moulds, 1992

Species of cicada

Macrotristria vittata, also known as the Jardine River cherrynose, is a species of cicada in the true cicada family. It is endemic to Australia. It was described in 1992 by Australian entomologist Maxwell Sydney Moulds.

== Etymology ==
The specific epithet vittata, from Latin vitta (‘band’ or ‘ribbon’), refers to the prominent green band formed by the pronotal collar.

== Description ==
The length of the forewing is 44–46 mm.

== Distribution and habitat ==
The species is known only from the Cape York Peninsula of Far North Queensland. The holotype was collected from riverine vegetation on the upper reaches of the Jardine River.

== Behaviour ==
Adults have been heard in October, clinging to the trunks and upper branches of the trees, uttering continuous whining calls.
