= Jassopsaltria gracilens =

Scientific classification
- Kingdom: Animalia
- Phylum: Arthropoda
- Clade: Pancrustacea
- Class: Insecta
- Order: Hemiptera
- Suborder: Auchenorrhyncha
- Family: Cicadidae
- Genus: Jassopsaltria
- Species: J. gracilens

Binomial name
- Jassopsaltria gracilens Moulds & Marshall, 2021

Species of cicada

Jassopsaltria gracilens, also known as the caramel fizzer, is a species of cicada in the true cicada family. It is endemic to Australia. It was described in 2021 by Australian entomologists Maxwell Sydney Moulds and David Marshall.

== Description ==
The forewing length is 15–17 mm.

== Distribution and habitat ==
The species occurs in northern Western Australia, from coastal districts between Broome and Port Hedland eastwards to near the Northern Territory border, in the Great Sandy Desert and Ord Victoria Plain bioregions. The holotype was collected 23 km north-east of the Sandfire Roadhouse. The habitat consists of low, open shrubland and bare areas with sparse vegetation.

== Behaviour ==
Adults have been heard from October to February, uttering high-pitched buzzing calls that vary in amplitude and end abruptly, followed by a series of chirps.
