= Macrotristria worora =

Scientific classification
- Kingdom: Animalia
- Phylum: Arthropoda
- Clade: Pancrustacea
- Class: Insecta
- Order: Hemiptera
- Suborder: Auchenorrhyncha
- Family: Cicadidae
- Genus: Macrotristria
- Species: M. worora

Binomial name
- Macrotristria worora Burns, 1964

Species of cicada

Macrotristria worora, also known as the Kimberley whiner, is a species of cicada in the true cicada family. It is endemic to Australia. It was described in 1964 by Australian entomologist Alexander Noble Burns

== Distribution and habitat ==
The species occurs in the Northern Kimberley bioregion of north-west Western Australia. The holotype was collected at Yampi.
