= Arenopsaltria exmouthensis =

Scientific classification
- Kingdom: Animalia
- Phylum: Arthropoda
- Clade: Pancrustacea
- Class: Insecta
- Order: Hemiptera
- Suborder: Auchenorrhyncha
- Family: Cicadidae
- Genus: Arenopsaltria
- Species: A. exmouthensis

Binomial name
- Arenopsaltria exmouthensis Moulds & Marshall, 2025

Species of cicada

Arenopsaltria exmouthensis is a species of cicada in the true cicada family. It is endemic to Australia. It was described in 2025 by entomologists Maxwell Sydney Moulds and David Marshall.

== Etymology ==
The specific epithet exmouthensis refers to the town of Exmouth near which the holotype was collected.

== Description ==
Measured forewing length was 30.5–33.6 mm in males, 28.8–34.3 mm in females; body length was 24.9–27.3 mm in males, 24.0–27.7 mm in females.

== Distribution and habitat ==
The species is found in coastal Western Australia from the North West Cape peninsula southwards to Coral Bay and Miaboolya Beach, in the Carnarvon bioregion. It occurs in dune grass habitats.

== Behaviour ==
Scattered records suggest that adults may be present in their habitat for much of the year.
