= Anapsaltoda pulchra =

Scientific classification
- Kingdom: Animalia
- Phylum: Arthropoda
- Clade: Pancrustacea
- Class: Insecta
- Order: Hemiptera
- Suborder: Auchenorrhyncha
- Family: Cicadidae
- Genus: Anapsaltoda
- Species: A. pulchra

Binomial name
- Anapsaltoda pulchra (Ashton, 1912)

Synonyms
- Psaltoda pulchra Ashton, 1912

Species of cicada

Anapsaltoda pulchra, also known as the golden emperor, is a species of cicada in the true cicada family. It is endemic to Australia. It was described in 1912 by Australian entomologist Julian Howard Ashton.

== Description ==
The species has a forewing length of 57–62 mm.

== Distribution and habitat ==
The species is found in the Wet Tropics of Queensland, from Mount Lewis southwards to the Kirrama Range, where it occurs in tropical rainforest habitats.

== Behaviour ==
Adults may be heard from late November to March, clinging to the trunks of rainforest trees, uttering loud, rich, yodelling calls.
