= Jassopsaltria danielsorum =

Scientific classification
- Kingdom: Animalia
- Phylum: Arthropoda
- Clade: Pancrustacea
- Class: Insecta
- Order: Hemiptera
- Suborder: Auchenorrhyncha
- Family: Cicadidae
- Genus: Jassopsaltria
- Species: J. danielsorum

Binomial name
- Jassopsaltria danielsorum Moulds & Marshall, 2021

Species of cicada

Jassopsaltria danielsorum, also known as the Keep River fizzer, is a species of cicada in the true cicada family. It is endemic to Australia. It was described in 2021 by Australian entomologists Maxwell Sydney Moulds and David Marshall.

== Description ==
The forewing length is 13–15 mm.

== Distribution and habitat ==
The species occurs in the Northern Territory, in the Victoria Bonaparte bioregion. The holotype was collected in the Keep River National Park some 400 km south-west of Darwin. The species is known only from the type locality. The habitat consists of sparse eucalypt woodland with an understorey of spinifex grassland.

== Behaviour ==
Adults have been observed in January. The call is unknown.
