= Macrotristria douglasi =

Scientific classification
- Kingdom: Animalia
- Phylum: Arthropoda
- Clade: Pancrustacea
- Class: Insecta
- Order: Hemiptera
- Suborder: Auchenorrhyncha
- Family: Cicadidae
- Genus: Macrotristria
- Species: M. douglasi

Binomial name
- Macrotristria douglasi Burns, 1964

Species of cicada

Macrotristria douglasi, also known as the Kimberley whiner, is a species of cicada in the true cicada family. It is endemic to Australia. It was described in 1964 by Australian entomologist Alexander Noble Burns

== Description ==
The length of the forewing is 32–38 mm.

== Distribution and habitat ==
The species occurs in the Kimberley region of far north Western Australia. The holotype was collected at Wotjulum at the mouth of the Fitzroy River. The habitat is low eucalypt woodland.

== Behaviour ==
Adults are heard during November and December, clinging to the branches and trunks of small trees, uttering strong, whining and pulsing calls.
