= Macrotristria kabikabia =

Scientific classification
- Kingdom: Animalia
- Phylum: Arthropoda
- Clade: Pancrustacea
- Class: Insecta
- Order: Hemiptera
- Suborder: Auchenorrhyncha
- Family: Cicadidae
- Genus: Macrotristria
- Species: M. kabikabia

Binomial name
- Macrotristria kabikabia Burns, 1964

Species of cicada

Macrotristria kabikabia, also known as the black cherrynose, is a species of cicada in the true cicada family. It is endemic to Australia. It was described in 1964 by Australian entomologist Alexander Noble Burns

== Description ==
The length of the forewing is 42–52 mm.

== Distribution and habitat ==
The species occurs in inland central-southern Queensland and has also been recorded from Mungindi in far north New South Wales. The holotype was collected at Yabba. The habitat is tall Acacia shrubland, eucalypt woodland and cypress-pine forest.

== Behaviour ==
Adults are heard from December to February, clinging to the upper branches and main trunks of the trees, uttering continuous, weakly-modulated, buzzing whines.
