= Macrotristria kulungura =

Scientific classification
- Kingdom: Animalia
- Phylum: Arthropoda
- Clade: Pancrustacea
- Class: Insecta
- Order: Hemiptera
- Suborder: Auchenorrhyncha
- Family: Cicadidae
- Genus: Macrotristria
- Species: M. kulungura

Binomial name
- Macrotristria kulungura Burns, 1964

Species of cicada

Macrotristria kulungura, also known as the coastal whiner, is a species of cicada in the true cicada family. It is endemic to Australia. It was described in 1964 by Australian entomologist Alexander Noble Burns

== Description ==
The length of the forewing is 31–44 mm. Adults are often green in colour.

== Distribution and habitat ==
The species occurs in coastal eastern Queensland from the islands of Torres Strait southwards to Clairview beach. The holotype was collected at Bowen. The habitat includes littoral rainforest, low shrubland and mangrove forest.

== Behaviour ==
Adults are heard from November to May, clinging to the upper branches and stems of trees and shrubs, uttering loud, pulsating whines.
