= Anapsaltoda cowanae =

Scientific classification
- Kingdom: Animalia
- Phylum: Arthropoda
- Clade: Pancrustacea
- Class: Insecta
- Order: Hemiptera
- Suborder: Auchenorrhyncha
- Family: Cicadidae
- Genus: Anapsaltoda
- Species: A. cowanae

Binomial name
- Anapsaltoda cowanae Moulds & Popple, 2023

Species of cicada

Anapsaltoda cowanae, also known as the green emperor, is a species of cicada in the true cicada family. It is endemic to Australia. It was described in 2023 by Australian entomologists Maxwell Sydney Moulds and Lindsay Popple.

== Description ==
The species has a forewing length of 51–58 mm.

== Distribution and habitat ==
The species is found in the Wet Tropics of north-eastern Queensland, from the vicinity of Cooktown southwards to Kuranda and Mareeba, where it occurs in the ecotones of tropical rainforest and sclerophyll forest habitats.

== Behaviour ==
Adults may be heard in December and January, sitting high in the forest's mid canopy, uttering pleasant yodelling calls.
