= Macrotristria bindalia =

Scientific classification
- Kingdom: Animalia
- Phylum: Arthropoda
- Clade: Pancrustacea
- Class: Insecta
- Order: Hemiptera
- Suborder: Auchenorrhyncha
- Family: Cicadidae
- Genus: Macrotristria
- Species: M. bindalia

Binomial name
- Macrotristria bindalia Burns, 1964

Species of cicada

Macrotristria bindalia is a species of cicada in the true cicada family. It is endemic to Australia. It was described in 1964 by Australian entomologist Alexander Noble Burns

== Distribution and habitat ==
The species occurs in North Queensland. The holotype was collected in the Haughton Valley in the Leichhardt Range.
