= Arenopsaltria nubivena =

Scientific classification
- Kingdom: Animalia
- Phylum: Arthropoda
- Clade: Pancrustacea
- Class: Insecta
- Order: Hemiptera
- Suborder: Auchenorrhyncha
- Family: Cicadidae
- Genus: Arenopsaltria
- Species: A. nubivena

Binomial name
- Arenopsaltria nubivena (Walker, 1858)

Synonyms
- Fidicina nubivena Walker, 1858

Species of cicada

Arenopsaltria nubivena, also known as the eastern sandgrinder, is a species of cicada in the true cicada family. It is endemic to Australia. It was described in 1858 by English entomologist Francis Walker.

== Description ==
The species has a forewing length of 21–28 mm.

== Distribution and habitat ==
The species is found across a wide swathe of southern inland Australia, having been recorded from all mainland states and the Northern Territory. It occurs in arid shrubland and mallee habitats on sandy soils.

== Behaviour ==
Adults may be heard from December to March, clinging to the branches of low vegetation, including the trunks of mallee eucalypts, uttering continuous, coarse, grating calls.
