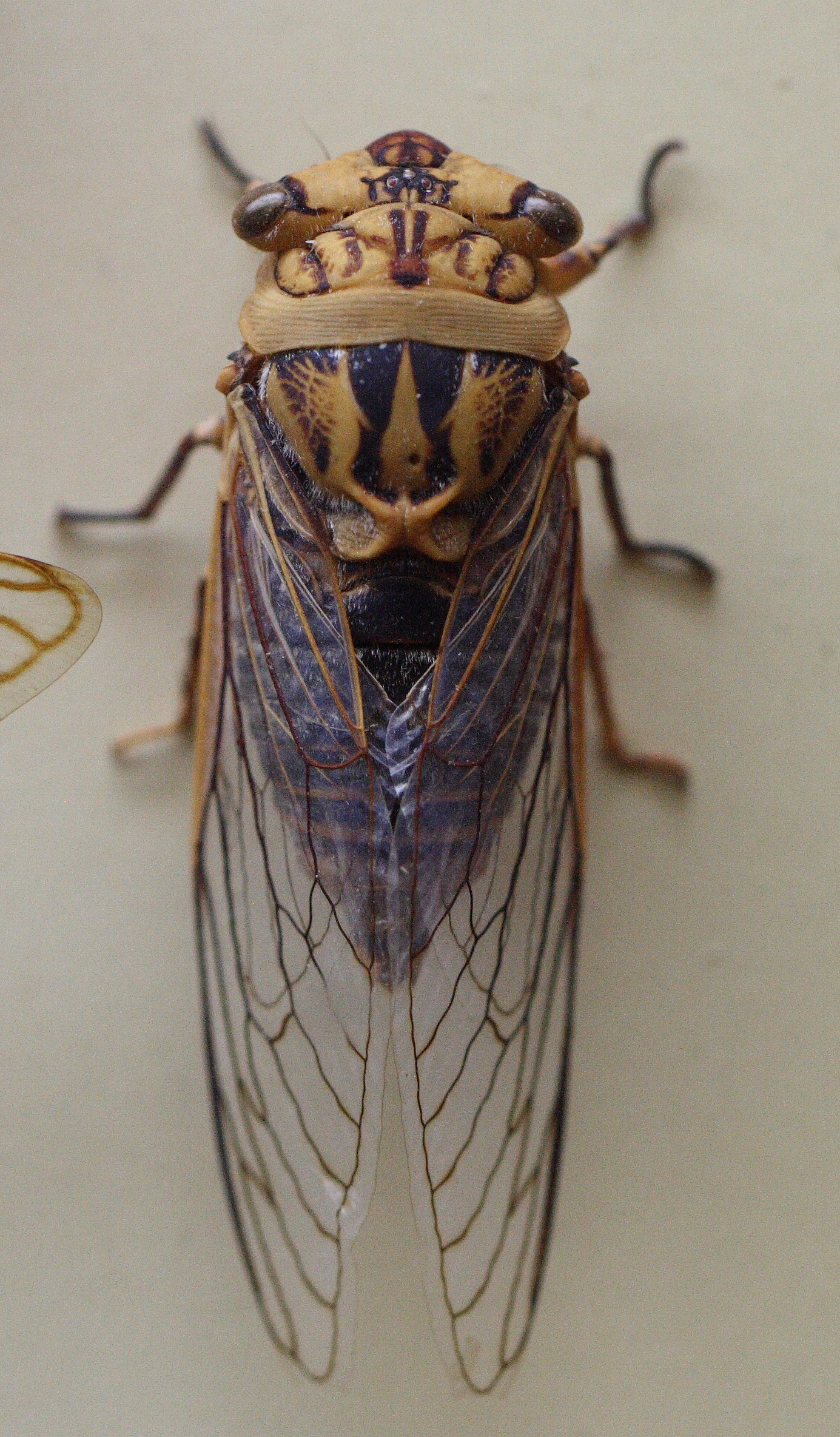

Scientific classification
- Kingdom: Animalia
- Phylum: Arthropoda
- Clade: Pancrustacea
- Class: Insecta
- Order: Hemiptera
- Suborder: Auchenorrhyncha
- Family: Cicadidae
- Genus: Macrotristria
- Species: M. godingi

Binomial name
- Macrotristria godingi Distant, 1907

= Macrotristria godingi =

Species of cicada

Macrotristria godingi, also known as the tiger cherrynose or tiger prince, is a species of cicada in the true cicada family. It is endemic to Australia. It was described in 1907 by English entomologist William Lucas Distant

== Description ==
The length of the forewing is 46–58 mm.

== Distribution and habitat ==
The species occurs in northern Queensland from the McLeod River south to Charters Towers, west to the Gilbert River, and east to Townsville and Bowen. The habitat includes tropical eucalypt woodland.

== Behaviour ==
Adults are heard from November to January, clinging to the main trunks and branches of trees, uttering calls characterised by a raucous, rumbling whine, followed by a series of pulses and finishing with an abrupt twang.
