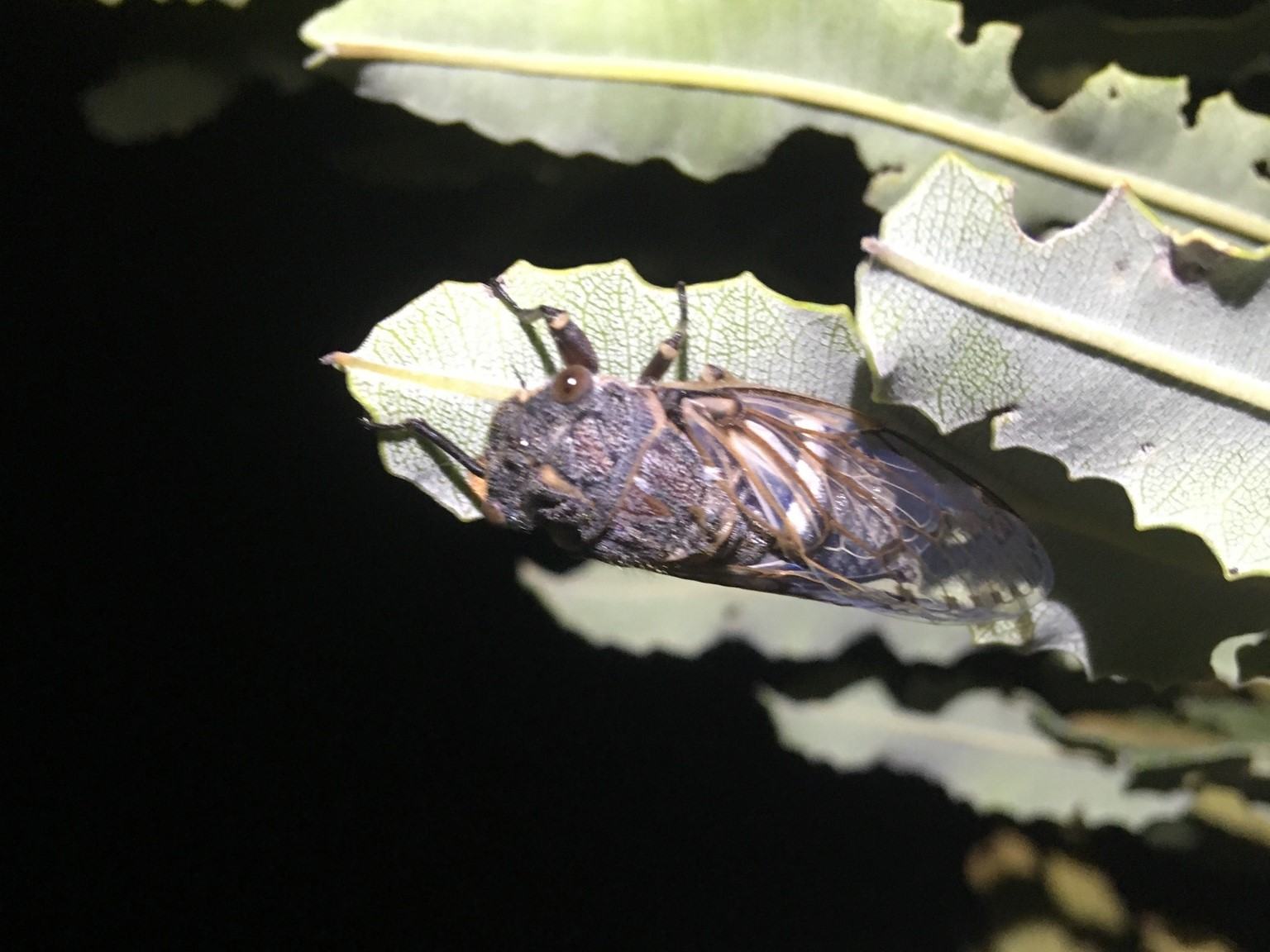

Scientific classification
- Kingdom: Animalia
- Phylum: Arthropoda
- Clade: Pancrustacea
- Class: Insecta
- Order: Hemiptera
- Suborder: Auchenorrhyncha
- Family: Cicadidae
- Genus: Arenopsaltria
- Species: A. fullo

Binomial name
- Arenopsaltria fullo (Walker, 1850)

Synonyms
- Fidicina fullo Walker, 1850

= Arenopsaltria fullo =

Species of cicada

Arenopsaltria fullo, also known as the sandgrinder, is a species of cicada in the true cicada family. It is endemic to Australia. It was described in 1850 by English entomologist Francis Walker.

== Description ==
The species has a forewing length of 28–34 mm.

== Distribution and habitat ==
The species is found in coastal Western Australia, from the mouth of the Murchison River southwards to Augusta, where it occurs in open heath habitats on sandy soils.

== Behaviour ==
Adults may be heard from September to March, clinging to the branches of small trees, uttering continuous, coarse, grating calls.
