= Arenopsaltria pygmaea =

Scientific classification
- Kingdom: Animalia
- Phylum: Arthropoda
- Clade: Pancrustacea
- Class: Insecta
- Order: Hemiptera
- Suborder: Auchenorrhyncha
- Family: Cicadidae
- Genus: Arenopsaltria
- Species: A. pygmaea

Binomial name
- Arenopsaltria pygmaea (Distant, 1904)

Synonyms
- Henicopsaltria pygmaea Distant, 1904

Species of cicada

Arenopsaltria pygmaea, also known as the pygmy sandgrinder, is a species of cicada in the true cicada family. It is endemic to Australia. It was described in 1904 by English entomologist William Lucas Distant.

== Description ==
The species has a forewing length of 14–18 mm.

== Distribution and habitat ==
The species is found in Western Australia from the Murchison River district near Geraldton south-east to near Corrigin. It occurs in tall heathland habitats on sandy soils.

== Behaviour ==
Adults may be heard from November to January, clinging to the branches of heath vegetation, uttering continuous, high-pitched, hissing calls.
