= Parnquila venosa =

Scientific classification
- Kingdom: Animalia
- Phylum: Arthropoda
- Clade: Pancrustacea
- Class: Insecta
- Order: Hemiptera
- Suborder: Auchenorrhyncha
- Family: Cicadidae
- Genus: Parnquila
- Species: P. venosa

Binomial name
- Parnquila venosa (Distant, 1907)

Synonyms
- Burbunga venosa Distant, 1907

Species of cicada

Parnquila venosa, also known as the spinifex buzzer, is a species of cicada in the true cicada family. It is endemic to Australia. It was described in 1907 by English entomologist William Lucas Distant.

== Description ==
The length of the forewing is 22–28 mm.

== Distribution and habitat ==
The species occurs in arid central Australia from west of Alice Springs in the MacDonnell Ranges of the Northern Territory, eastwards to the eastern margin of the Simpson Desert in western Queensland. The associated habitat is spinifex grassland.

== Behaviour ==
The cicadas are xylem feeders. Adults are heard in January and February, clinging to the blades of spinifex grasses, uttering clean, pulsing, buzzing calls.
