= Samaecicada mallee =

Scientific classification
- Kingdom: Animalia
- Phylum: Arthropoda
- Clade: Pancrustacea
- Class: Insecta
- Order: Hemiptera
- Suborder: Auchenorrhyncha
- Family: Cicadidae
- Genus: Samaecicada
- Species: S. mallee

Binomial name
- Samaecicada mallee Popple, 2023

Species of cicada

Samaecicada mallee is a species of cicada, also known as the mallee fairy, in the true cicada family, Cicadettinae subfamily and Cicadettini tribe. The species is endemic to Australia. It was described in 2023 by Australian entomologist Lindsay Popple.

== Description ==
The length of the forewing is 16–21 mm.

== Distribution and habitat ==
The species is known only from south-eastern South Australia in the vicinity of Meningie, Malinong and the Messent Conservation Park. The habitat includes mallee and heath communities.

== Behaviour ==
Adult males may be heard in December and January, emitting rapid ticking calls in flight.
