= Arenopsaltria dryas =

Scientific classification
- Kingdom: Animalia
- Phylum: Arthropoda
- Clade: Pancrustacea
- Class: Insecta
- Order: Hemiptera
- Suborder: Auchenorrhyncha
- Family: Cicadidae
- Genus: Arenopsaltria
- Species: A. dryas

Binomial name
- Arenopsaltria dryas Moulds & Marshall, 2025

Species of cicada

Arenopsaltria dryas is a species of cicada in the true cicada family. It is endemic to Australia. It was described in 2025 by entomologists Maxwell Sydney Moulds and David Marshall.

== Etymology ==
The specific epithet dryas refers to the wood-nymphs of Greek mythology known as dryads.

== Description ==
Measured forewing length was 31.8–38.3 mm in males, 33.0–38.9 mm in females; body length 24.5–31.0 mm in males, 25.9–32.7 mm in females

== Distribution and habitat ==
The species is found in the arid Mid West region of Western Australia where it has been recorded from the Murchison and Yalgoo bioregions.

== Behaviour ==
Adults occupy Acacia, Eucalyptus and Grevillea trees, uttering coarse, whining, buzzing calls.
