= Samaecicada =

Scientific classification
- Kingdom: Animalia
- Phylum: Arthropoda
- Clade: Pancrustacea
- Class: Insecta
- Order: Hemiptera
- Suborder: Auchenorrhyncha
- Family: Cicadidae
- Subfamily: Cicadettinae
- Genus: Samaecicada; Popple & Emery, 2010

Genus of cicadas

Samaecicada is a genus of cicadas, also known as fairies, in the family Cicadidae, subfamily Cicadettinae and tribe Cicadettini. It is endemic to Australia. It was described in 2010 by entomologists Lindsay Popple and David L. Emery.

== Species ==
As of 2025 there were two described species in the genus:

- Samaecicada mallee Popple, 2023 (Mallee Fairy)
- Samaecicada subolivacea (Ashton, 1912) (Red-eyed Fairy)
