= Macrotristria hieroglyphicalis =

Scientific classification
- Kingdom: Animalia
- Phylum: Arthropoda
- Clade: Pancrustacea
- Class: Insecta
- Order: Hemiptera
- Suborder: Auchenorrhyncha
- Family: Cicadidae
- Genus: Macrotristria
- Species: M. hieroglyphicalis

Binomial name
- Macrotristria hieroglyphicalis (Kirkaldy, 1909)

Synonyms
- Cicada hieroglyphica Goding & Froggatt, 1904

Species of cicada

Macrotristria hieroglyphicalis, also known as the Derby whiner, is a species of cicada in the true cicada family. It is endemic to Australia. It was described in 1909 by English entomologist George Willis Kirkaldy.

== Description ==
The length of the forewing is 42–45 mm.

== Distribution and habitat ==
The species occurs in the Kimberley region of far north Western Australia, in the vicinity of the town of Derby, including Lennard River and Pinnacle Creek. The habitat includes open woodland and low shrubland with scattered trees.

== Behaviour ==
Adults are heard from December to April, clinging to the stems and branches of trees, uttering metallic whining calls.
