= Parnquila =

Scientific classification
- Kingdom: Animalia
- Phylum: Arthropoda
- Clade: Pancrustacea
- Class: Insecta
- Order: Hemiptera
- Suborder: Auchenorrhyncha
- Infraorder: Cicadomorpha
- Superfamily: Cicadoidea
- Family: Cicadidae
- Subfamily: Cicadinae
- Genus: Parnquila; Moulds, 2012

Genus of cicadas

Parnquila is a genus of cicadas, commonly called buzzers, in the family Cicadidae and tribe Tamasini. It is found across much of arid and semi-arid Australia. It was described in 2012 by Australian entomologist Maxwell Sydney Moulds.

== Species ==
As of 2025 there were four described species in the genus:

- Parnquila hillieri (Distant, 1906) - Cane Grass Buzzer
- Parnquila magna (Distant, 1913) - Goldfields Buzzer
- Parnquila unicolor (Ashton, 1921) - Perth Buzzer
- Parnquila venosa (Distant, 1907) - Spinifex Buzzer
