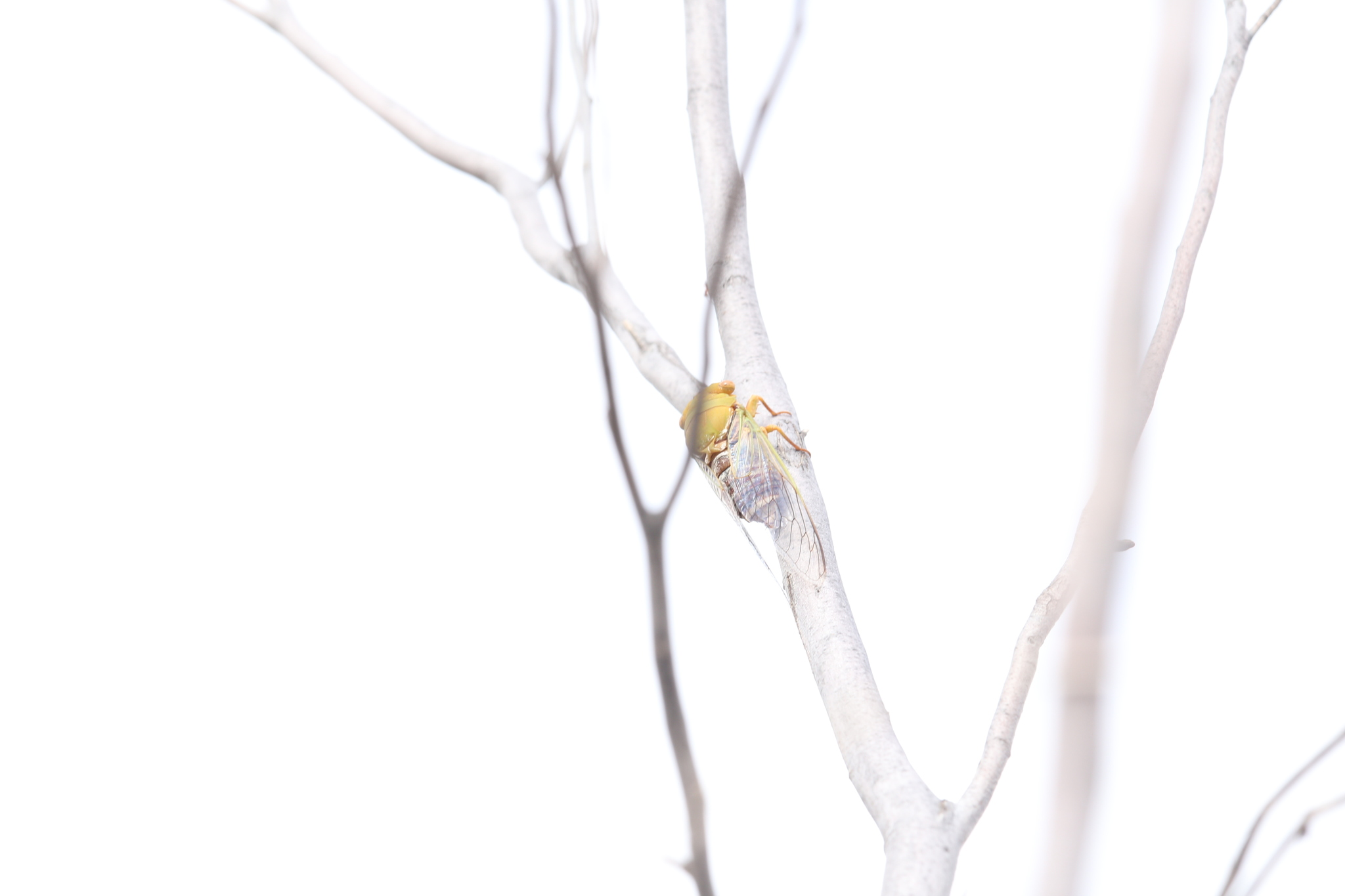

Scientific classification
- Kingdom: Animalia
- Phylum: Arthropoda
- Clade: Pancrustacea
- Class: Insecta
- Order: Hemiptera
- Suborder: Auchenorrhyncha
- Family: Cicadidae
- Genus: Macrotristria
- Species: M. extrema

Binomial name
- Macrotristria extrema (Distant, 1892)

Synonyms
- Cicada extrema Distant, W.L. 1892

= Macrotristria extrema =

Species of cicada

Macrotristria extrema, also known as the western whiner, is a species of cicada in the true cicada family. It is endemic to Australia. It was described in 1892 by English entomologist William Lucas Distant

== Description ==
The length of the forewing is 34–38 mm.

== Distribution and habitat ==
The species occurs in coastal and subcoastal north-western Western Australia from Carnarvon north-eastwards to Sandfire, and inland to Marble Bar and Wittenoom. The habitat includes low open shrubland with scattered trees and dune vegetation.

== Behaviour ==
Adults are heard from October to May, clinging to the stems and branches of trees and shrubs, uttering continuous harsh whines.
