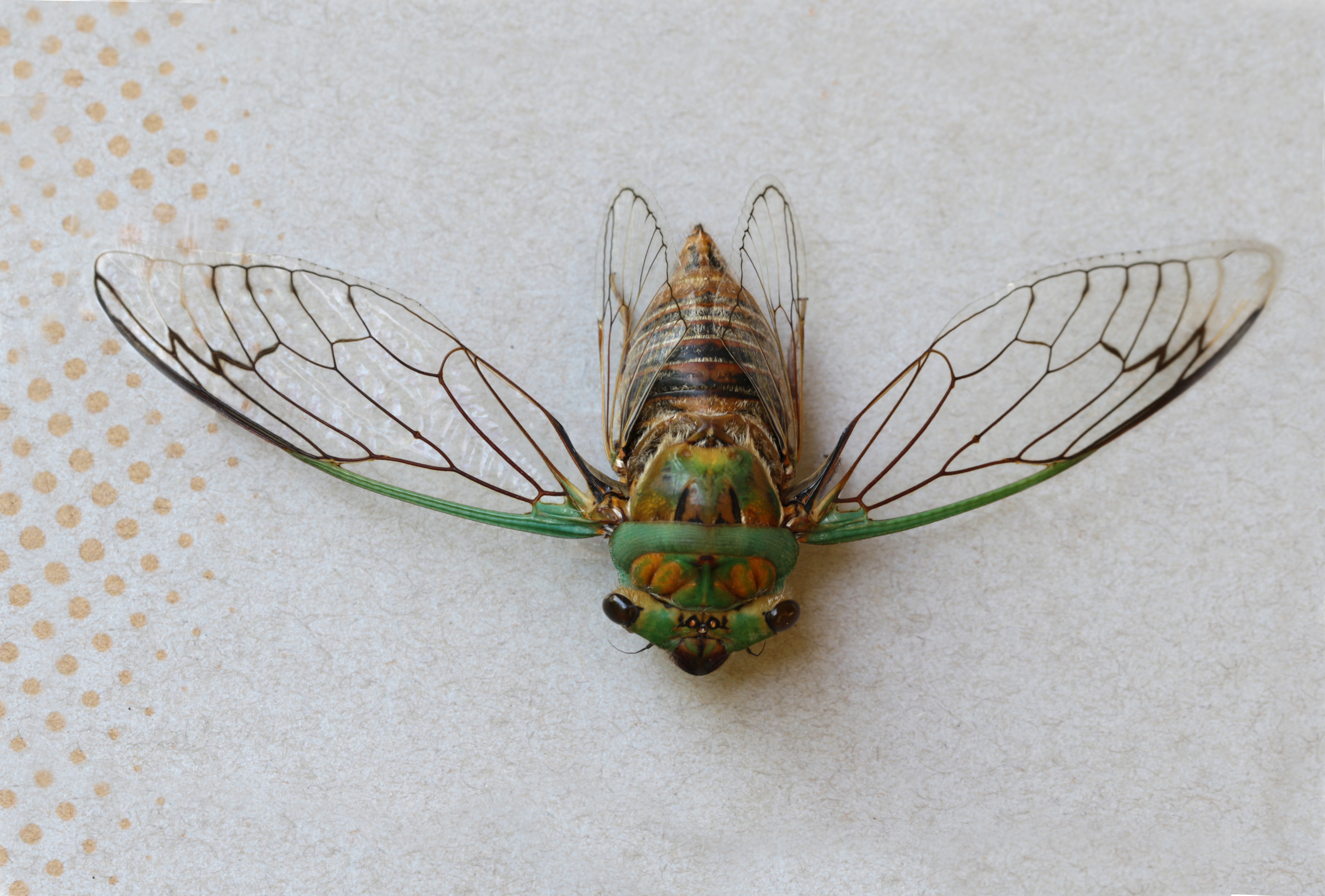
- Macrotristria sylvara

Scientific classification
- Kingdom: Animalia
- Phylum: Arthropoda
- Clade: Pancrustacea
- Class: Insecta
- Order: Hemiptera
- Suborder: Auchenorrhyncha
- Family: Cicadidae
- Subfamily: Cicadinae
- Tribe: Macrotristriini
- Genus: Macrotristria; Stål, 1870

Species
- See text

= Macrotristria =

Genus of true bugs

Macrotristria is a genus of cicadas, also known as cherrynoses or whiners, in the Macrotristriini tribe of the Cicadinae subfamily.

== Species ==
As of 2025, twenty-one species were listed in the Australian Faunal Directory:

- Macrotristria angularis (Germar, 1834) - cherrynose
- Macrotristria bindalia Burns, 1964 - corroboree cicada
- Macrotristria doddi Ashton, 1912 - Darwin whiner
- Macrotristria dorsalis Ashton, 1912 - little whiner
- Macrotristria douglasi Burns, 1964 - Kimberley whiner
- Macrotristria extrema (Distant, 1892) - western whiner
- Macrotristria frenchi Ashton, 1914 - northern steamer
- Macrotristria godingi Distant, 1907 - tiger cherrynose, tiger prince
- Macrotristria hieroglyphicalis (Kirkaldy, 1909) - Derby whiner
- Macrotristria intersecta (Walker, 1850) - corroboree cicada, green whizzer
- Macrotristria kabikabia Burns, 1964 - black cherrynose
- Macrotristria kathhillodes Olive, 2022 deafening cherrynose
- Macrotristria kulungura Burns, 1964 - coastal whiner
- Macrotristria lachlani Moulds, 1992 - Cape York cherrynose
- Macrotristria maculicollis Ashton, 1914 - false cherrynose
- Macrotristria monteithi Moulds, 2022 - Maranoa cherrynose
- Macrotristria stevewilsoni Popple, 2016 - Shoalwater cherrynose
- Macrotristria sylvara (Distant, 1901) - northern cherrynose
- Macrotristria thophoides Ashton, 1914 - false drummer
- Macrotristria worora Burns, 1964 - Kimberley whiner
- Macrotristria vittata Moulds, 1992 - Jardine River cherrynose
