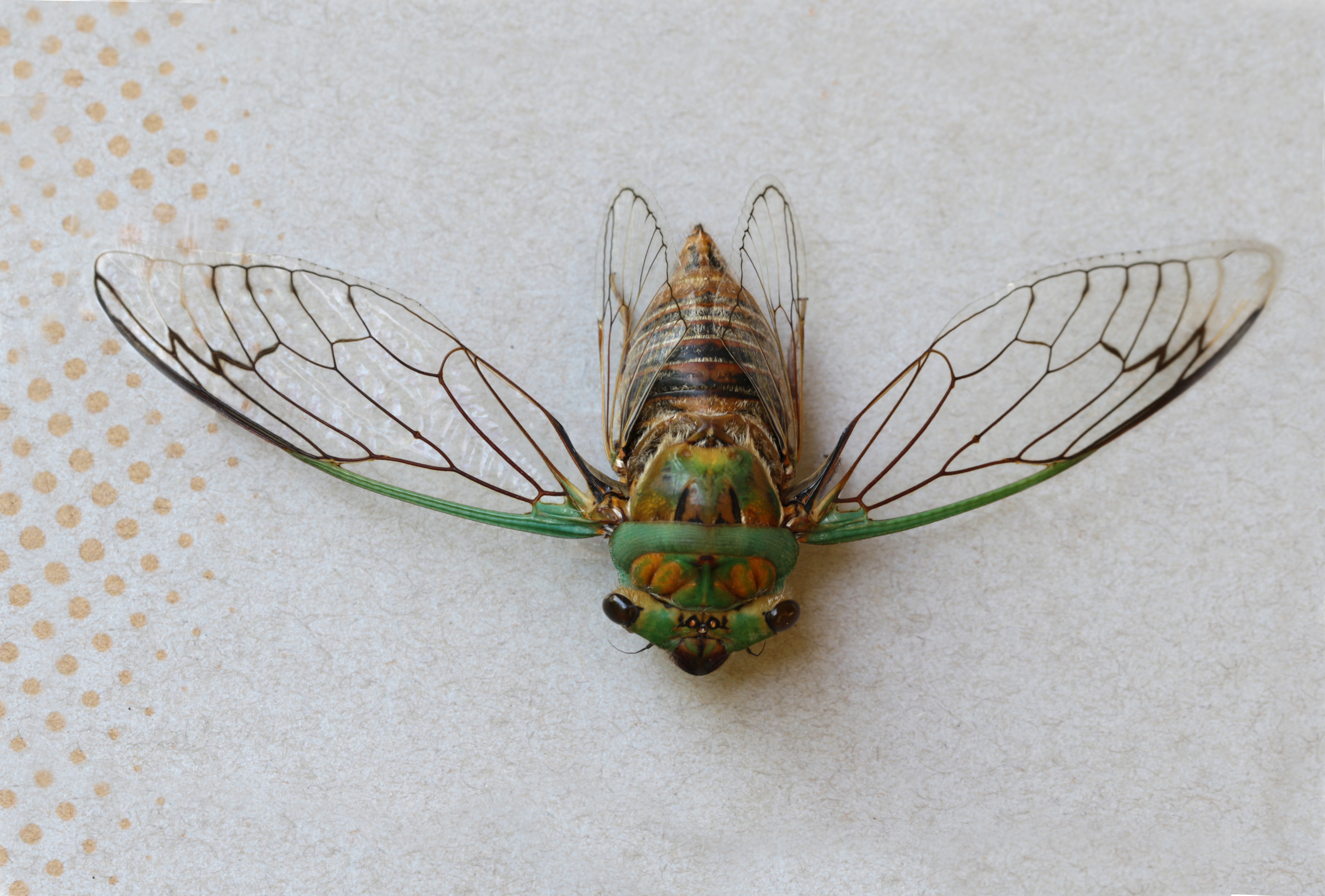

Scientific classification
- Kingdom: Animalia
- Phylum: Arthropoda
- Clade: Pancrustacea
- Class: Insecta
- Order: Hemiptera
- Suborder: Auchenorrhyncha
- Family: Cicadidae
- Genus: Macrotristria
- Species: M. sylvara

Binomial name
- Macrotristria sylvara (Distant, 1901)

= Macrotristria sylvara =

Species of cicada

Macrotristria sylvara is an Australian species of cicada in the family Cicadidae, commonly known as the northern cherrynose or green cherrynose.

== Description ==
Adults have green markings on the face, thorax and forewing costal vein, with yellow and brown on the thorax and abdomen. The forewing length is 48–62 mm.

== Distribution and habitat ==
The species is distributed from the Torres Strait down the Queensland coast to about Ingham. Its habitat includes coastal bushland, open forest and parks.

== Behaviour ==
Adults appear from December until March, clinging to the upper branches of eucalypts and other trees, uttering strong and continuous, rattling calls, with intervals of pulsing and revving.
