= Bushland =

Natural ecosystem in Australia

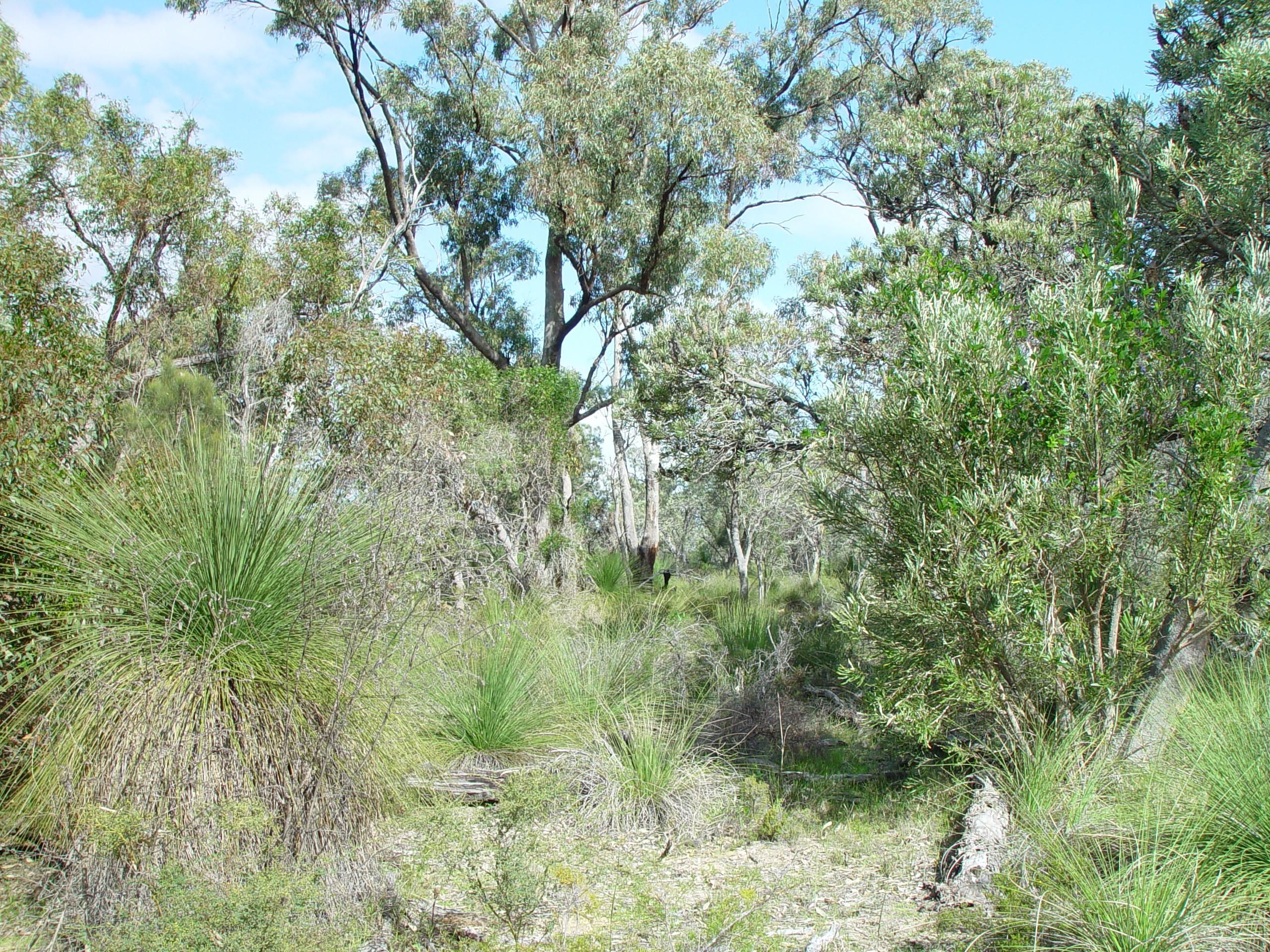
Bushland in Western Australia

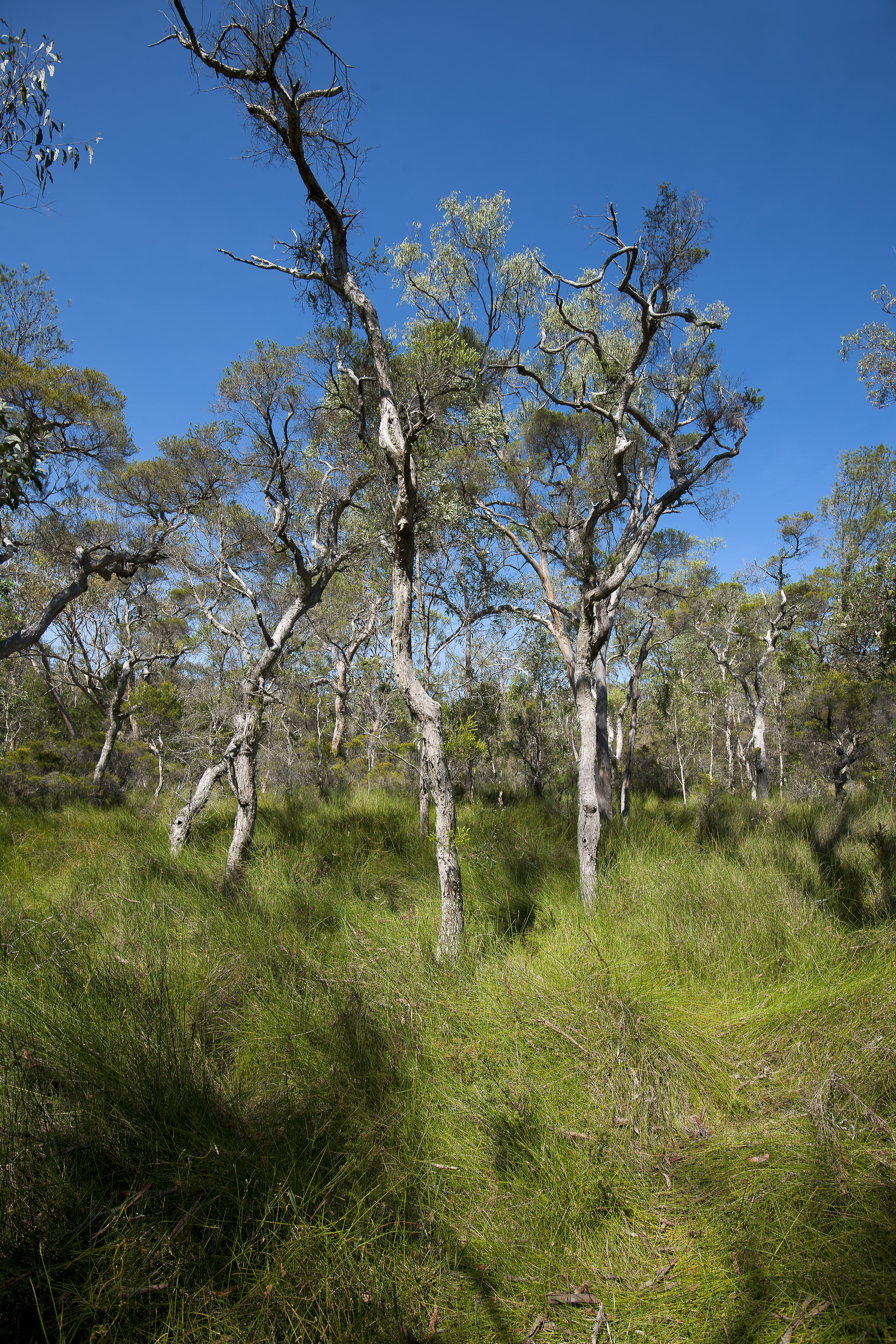
Bushland in Brisbane set aside for the protection of koalas

In Australia, bushland is a blanket term for land which supports remnant vegetation or land which is disturbed but still retains a predominance of the original floristics and structure.

Human survival in bushland has a whole mythology evolving around it, with the stories of Aboriginal trackers and bushrangers deeply entrenched in Australian folklore. Bushland has been a traditional source of wood for fuel and bushfood.

Bushland provides a number of ecosystem services including the protection of water quality, stopping erosion, acting as a windbreak, and trapping nutrients. Bushland is prone to bushfires. This presents a challenge to authorities as infrastructure and habitations encroach into bushland areas.

== Preservation ==
Until recently Australia had a very high rate of land clearing, which resulted in the destruction of bushland. Since 2006 the rate of land clearing has declined significantly. This is partially attributed to legislation that placed a ban on broad scale clearing of mature bushland in Queensland in 2006 and an expansion of those bans to regrowing bushland with a high conservation value in 2009. In New South Wales bushfires cause the greatest destruction of bushland, followed by land clearing for crops, grazing, road and buildings.

Bushland preservation has become the focus of some conservation efforts. In Brisbane, the Brisbane City Council has established a Bushland Acquisition Program, which is funded by a small levy paid by rate-payers. The program began in 1990 and aims to protect koala habitat from urban development. It is estimated that the koala population in the area had declined from 6,240 in 1996 to 1,500 in 2012.

== See also ==
- Bush regeneration
- The Bush
- Bushveld
