= Julian Howard Ashton =

English journalist, writer, artist and critic (1877–1964)

- Born: 9 August 1877; Islington, London, England
- Died: 30 April 1964 (aged 86); New South Wales, Australia
- Occupations: Writer; journalist; artist, critic
- Spouse: Mary Ethel Roberts
- Children: Three sons, one daughter
- Parent(s): Julian Rossi Ashton (father), Eliza Ann Pugh (mother)

Julian Howard Ashton (9 August 1877 – 30 April 1964), often referred to as Howard Ashton, was a journalist, writer, artist and critic born in England, who had a considerable career in Australia.

== History ==
Ashton was born in Islington, London, a son of Julian Rossi Ashton and his wife Eliza Ann Pugh, who with their family moved to Melbourne in 1878, and Sydney five years later, where his father founded his famous art school.

Ashton became a junior shipping reporter of The Sydney Morning Herald but, two years later, he moved to Melbourne, where he was given the position of reporter by The Argus. He also drew portraits for the Sydney Daily Telegraph in his late teenage years and early adulthood. By his early twenties, Ashton had become a well-known figure in the local media and newspaper companies, writing music, literary and art reviews. He was given the title of music critic in 1910. Ashton was celebrated for his short stories in The Bulletin, following which success he began selling his paintings in art galleries, then began writing for British magazines such as Pall Mall Gazette and Chambers's Journal.

He became a respected and dedicated member of magazines and newspaper companies. He resumed his criticism of music, and other arts in 1926, when he was made an associate editor.

Ashton had never worked as a full-time artist; however despite this, in 1938 he won the Sydney sesquicentenary prize for landscape drawings. Ashton was, as well as an artist, a musician who had been known to entertain guests and lodgers at his Mosman house; it was because of this that the suggestion of forming the first Sydney String Quartet was put forward.

Ashton was an amateur entomologist specialising in cicadas.

He was president of the Royal Art Society from 1942 to 1945 or later (his father held that office 1897–1898 and 1907–1921).

Ashton died at age 86 in New South Wales and was cremated.

== Family ==
Ashton was the eldest child of artist Julian Rossi Ashton and Eliza Ann, née Pugh, his first wife. While attending his father's art school, Ashton began a relationship with Mary Ethel Roberts (died 18 December 1945), whom he married on 24 January 1908. Together, they had three sons and one daughter. A month after his wife's death, Ashton resigned from The Sun in order to devote his time to painting and reading, and to be closer to his family.

Their third son, J(ulian) Richard Ashton, and his wife Edith Wendrida "Wenda" Ashton, née Smith, ran the Julian Ashton Art School from 1960.

== Sources ==
- Australia Dictionary of Biography: Online edition, for Ashton, Julian Howard. Retrieved on 01/10/2007
