= Scientific collection =

Systematic collection of objects

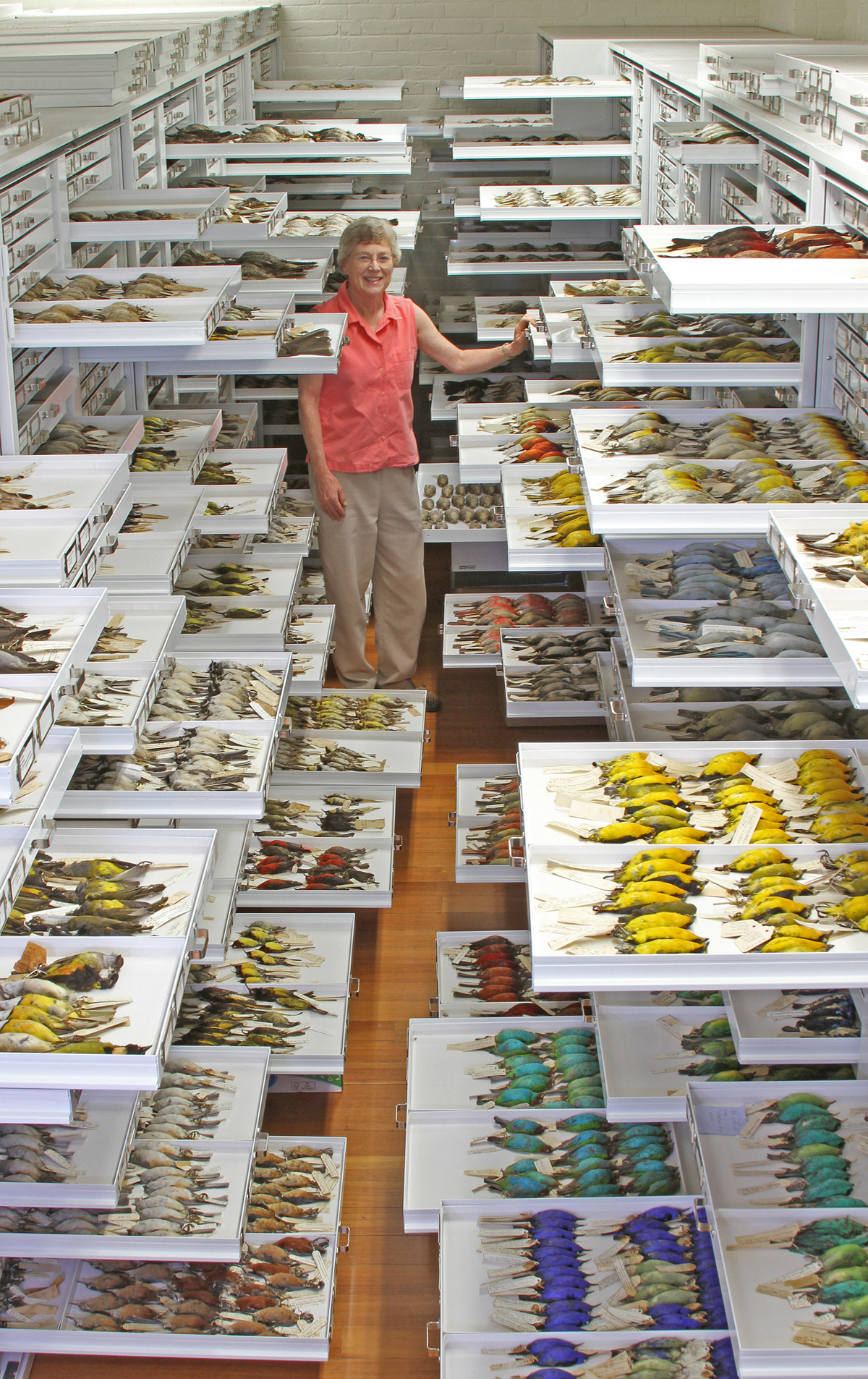
Ornithological collection at the Museum of Comparative Zoology of Natural history of Harvard Museum of Natural History. Museum collections are tremendous repositories of specimens and data of many sorts, including phenotypes, tissue samples, vocal recordings, geographic distributions, parasites, and diet.

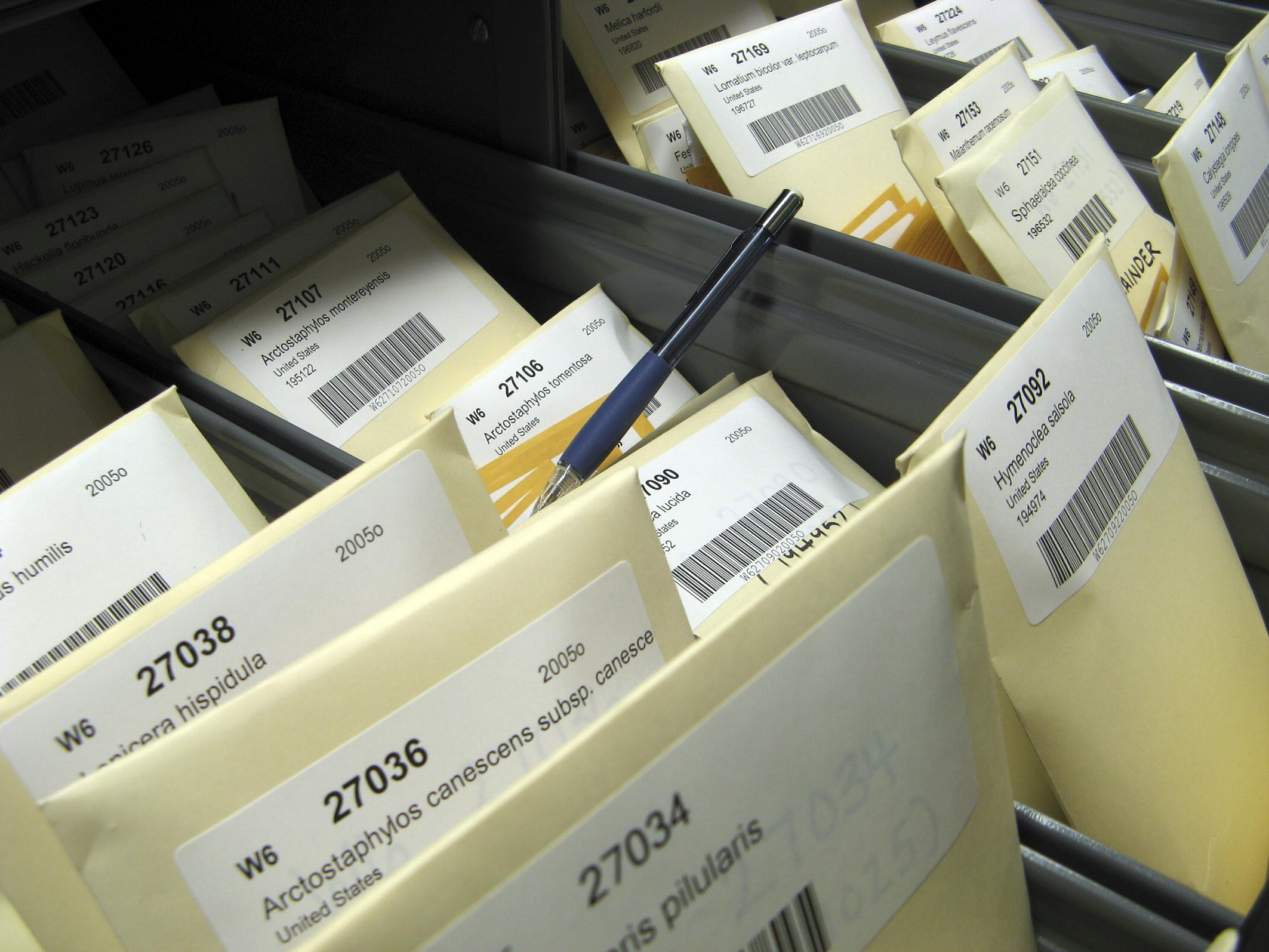
View in a Seedbank at the Western Regional Plant Introduction Station

A scientific collection is a collection of items that are preserved, catalogued, and managed for the purpose of scientific study.

Scientific collections dealing specifically with organisms plants, fungi, animals, insects and their remains, may also be called natural history collections or biological collections. The latter may contain either living stocks or preserved repositories of biodiversity specimens and materials.

Scientific collections hold a tangible portion of the cumulative evidence base in such fields as biology (especially taxonomy and evolutionary biology), geology, and archaeology. They may be stored and managed by governments´ large natural history museums and herbaria, by educational institutions (e.g. colleges and universities), private organizations (including museums), or individuals.

Prominent uses of scientific collections include the systematic description and identification of biological species, the study and prediction of long-term historical trends (including impacts of climate change), the dating and analysis of historical objects (e.g. via wood samples and ice cores with annual rings), and the maintenance of teaching resources.

== Indexing ==
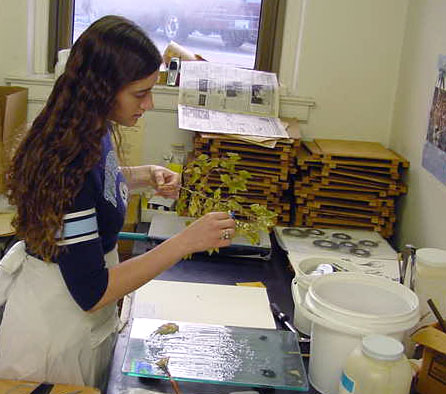
Preparation of a plant for a Herbarium

The indexing of the collections was historically made by directories, catalogs, index cards, today supplemented by or replaced by databases with information such as e.g. scientific description, including picture, name, location, find circumstances, fund age, scientific analysis, phylogenetic relationships, DNA and isotope analysis results, analysis of pollutants, references, condition of the property, owner changes and name changes.. A global registry for indexing published series of herbarium specimens, so-called exsiccatae, is the database IndExs – Index of Exsiccatae.

Many organizations support the indexing and handling of their collections by specialist libraries.

== Institutions ==
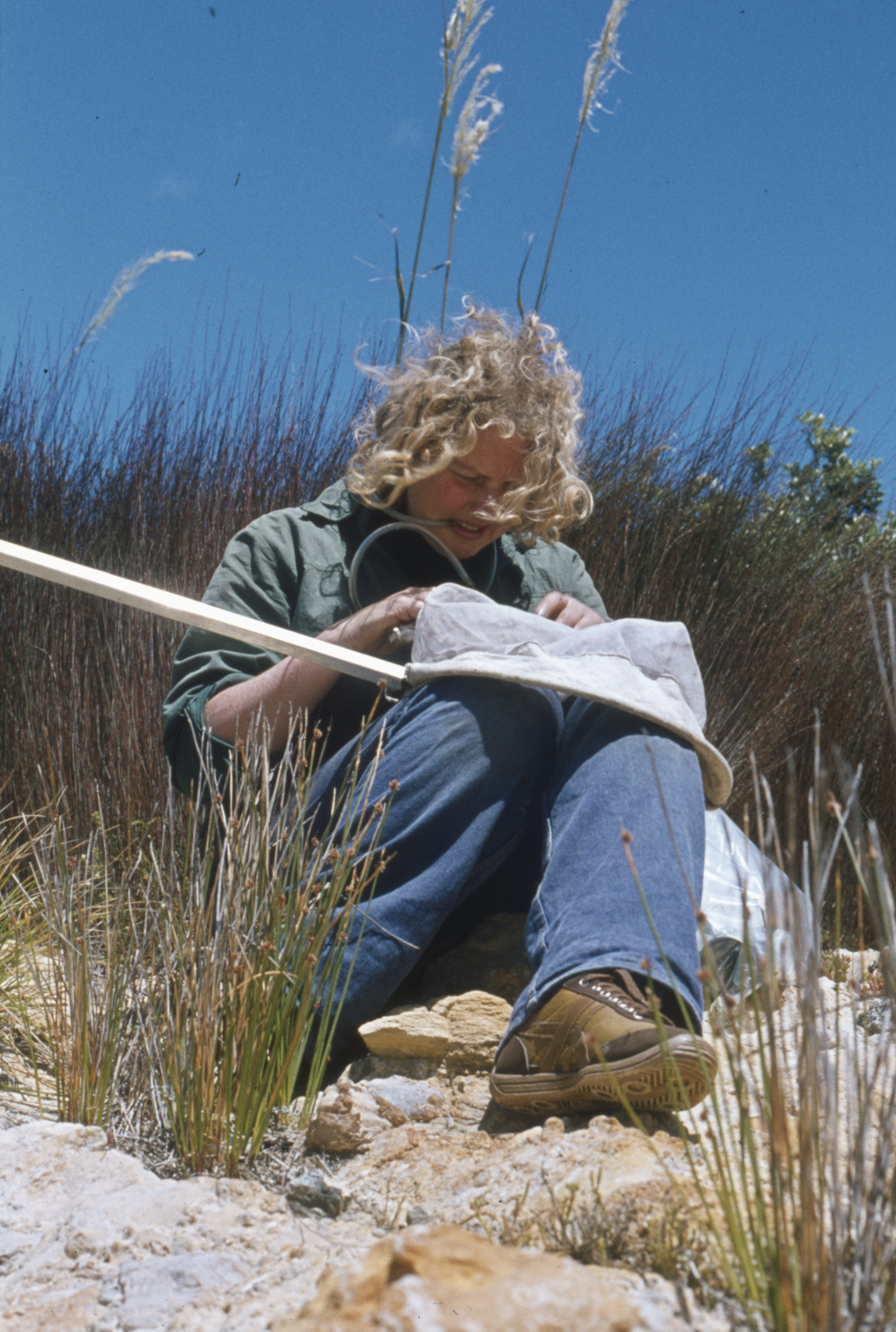
Entomologist Clare Butcher collecting specimens for the New Zealand Arthropod Collection.

Research collections hold especially museums, notably natural history museums, botanical gardens, universities and other research institutions. There are also independent research collections, such as the Zoological State Collection Munich with over 20 million stuffed animals for research purposes. Public authorities such as national geological agencies or police units hold partly research collections too.

The Natural History Museum in London - with one of the biggest collections worldwide - is home to life and earth science specimens comprising some 70 million items within five main collections: botany, entomology, mineralogy, palaeontology and zoology.

Largest German Natural History Museum is the Museum für Naturkunde, Berlin, with over 30 million objects, including 9 million beetles and 275,000 jars with preserved in alcohol animals.

== Geology / Earth Sciences collections ==
Remarkable Earth Sciences collections:

- In Germany the Technische Universität Bergakademie Freiberg has particularly rich geological research collections. This includes 80,000 minerals in the Mineralogical Collection, 120,000 samples from deposits in the deposit collection, 16,000 rocks in the petrological collection, 114,000 macro - and almost a million micro-fossils in the fossil collection, 70,000 macro - and microfossils 12,000 and 15,000 lithostratigraphically or facies relevant rock samples and about 14,000 specimens and sections in the Stratigraphic collection, 30,000 pieces of evidence and 30,000 preparations and cuts in Fuel Geological Collection and 34,000 objects in the central body of evidence Lithothek.
- The IODP/ODP - Kernlager / Bremen Core Repository (BCR) at the University of Bremen has a collection of 140 km of drill core from the Ocean Drilling Program with 190,000 individual pieces, which are stored in a 1.100m ² large cold storage at 4 °C.
- The Musée de Minéralogie a museum of mineralogy operated by the École nationale supérieure des mines de Paris (Mines ParisTech) containing some 100,000 samples including 80,000 minerals, 15,000 rocks, 4,000 ores, 400 meteorites, 700 gems, and 300 artificial minerals.
- The most important geological collections in Europe include the Museum of the Earth of Polish Academy of Sciences in Warsaw With more than 170,000 minerals, meteorites, fossil and an amber collection.

== Biological collections / Life Sciences collections ==
Biological collections are a requirement for species descriptions, following the International Code of Zoological Nomenclature. That is, if a new species is described in the literature, at least one specimen of that species (the "holotype") needs to be deposited in a collection (Article 72.3).

Typical collection objects in biology are fossils of organisms, preserved samples of extant animals and plants (protected from decay by drying or preparation), but also live plants, animals, bacteria and active viruses.

Plant collections are referred to as herbaria. Live plants are collected in the Botanical gardens, (trees ) in arboretums, aquariums, and partly in seedbanks, as well as e.g. algae from the Culture Collection of Algae Göttingen. Live animals are collected in zoos and aquariums. The great Old Botanical Garden of the University of Göttingen e.g. represents about a collection of 17,000 species.

=== Notable collections ===
Particularly well known in Germany are the major research collections of the Naturmuseum Senckenberg of Senckenberg Society for Nature Research in Frankfurt am Main with over 22 million natural objects (Herbaria 1 Million). Senckenberg offers to open up his collection to the SESAM database.

The Macaulay Library is the world's largest archive of animal sounds. It includes more than 175,000 audio recordings covering 75 percent of the world's bird species. There are an ever increasing numbers of insect, fish, frog, and mammal recordings. The video archive includes over 50,000 clips, representing over 3,500 species.

An example for a special collection are the objects of the Deutsche Sammlung von Mikroorganismen und Zellkulturen (German Collection of Microorganisms and Cell Cultures).

==== Selected large collections (more than 1,000,000 specimens) in Europe ====
- in France: Muséum National d'Histoire Naturelle, Paris contains 9,500,000 specimens; Université Montpellier contains 4,000,000 specimens; Université Claude Bernard Lyon 1 contains 4,000,000 specimens
- in Russia: Komarov Botanical Institute in St. Petersburg contains 7,160,000 specimens,
- in Great Britain: Royal Botanic Gardens Kew contains 7,000,000 specimens; British Museum of Natural History contains 80,000,000 specimens; Royal Botanic Garden Edinburgh contains 2,000,000 specimens; University of Cambridge contains 1,000,000 specimens; University of Manchester contains 1,000,000 specimens;
- in Switzerland: Conservatoire et Jardin botaniques de la Ville de Genève contains 6,000,000 specimens; Eidgenössische Technische Hochschule Zürich contains 1,500,000 specimens,
- in Austria: Naturhistorisches Museum Wien contains 5,000,000 specimens; Universität Wien contains 1,400,000 specimens,
- in Sweden: Swedish Museum of Natural History (Naturhistoriska riksmuseet) contains 4,400,000 specimens; Uppsala University contains 3,000,000 specimens, Botanical Museum, Lund contains 2,500,000 specimens, University of Gothenburg contains 1,600,000 specimens,
- in Netherlands: National Herbarium of the Netherlands (Nationaal Herbarium Nederland) contains 4,000,000 specimens
- in Italy: Museo di Storia Naturale dell'Università, Florence contains 3,650,000 specimens; Università degli Studi di Roma La Sapienza, Rome contains 1,120,000 specimens; Università degli Studi di Torino contains 1,000,000 specimens,
- in Belgium: National Botanic Garden of Belgium contains 3,500,000 specimens,
- in Germany: Botanischer Garten und Botanisches Museum Berlin-Dahlem, Zentraleinrichtung der Freien Universität Berlin contains 3,000,000 specimens, University of Jena contains 3,000,000 specimens; Botanische Staatssammlung München contains 2,500,000 specimens; Biozentrum Klein-Flottbek, Hamburg contains 1,400,000 specimens; Staatliches Museum für Naturkunde, Stuttgart contains 1,000,000 specimens
- in Finland: University of Helsinki contains 3,000,000 specimens,
- in Denmark: University of Copenhagen contains 2,510,000 specimens,
- in Norway: Botanical Museum, Oslo contains 1,800,000 specimens,

==== Selected large biological collections (more than 1,000,000 specimens) in the Americas ====
- in United States: New York Botanical Garden Herbarium contains 7,200,000 specimens; Missouri Botanical Garden Herbarium contains 6,231,000 specimens; Harvard University Herbaria contains 5,005,000 specimens; United States National Herbarium, Washington contains 4,340,000 specimens; Field Museum, Chicago contains 2,650,000 specimens; University and Jepson Herbaria of University of California, Berkeley contains 2,200,000 specimens; California Academy of Sciences Herbarium of California Academy of Sciences contains 1,850,000 specimens; University of Michigan Herbarium, Ann Arbor contains 1,700,000 specimens; Academy of Natural Sciences Herbarium of Academy of Natural Sciences, Philadelphia contains 1,430,000 specimens; Wisconsin State Herbarium of University of Wisconsin-Madison, Madison contains 1,100,000 specimens; Rancho Santa Ana Botanic Garden Herbarium of Rancho Santa Ana Botanic Garden, Claremont contains 1,084,000 specimens; Plant Resources Center of University of Texas at Austin contains 1,006,000 specimens; Botanical Research Institute of Texas, Fort Worth contains 1,000,000 specimens
- in Canada: Agriculture and Agri-Food Canada, Vascular Plant Herbarium contains 1,335,000 specimens,
- in Mexico: Universidad Nacional Autónoma de México, Mexico City contains 1,120,000 specimens.

== Collection permit ==
Many, if not most countries have strict regulations for collecting. This is often a consequence of past, colonial exploitation, when foreign countries exported biological or other materials in large quantities without permission or compensation for local people. Over the past decades, many countries have become very sensitive of such exploitations and national laws now regulate what can be collected by whom.

Collecting biological (or other) specimens usually requires a research or collection permit. For instance, Indonesia passed a law in 2019 that includes strict requirements on foreign scientists doing research in the country, including the need to include local collaborators and effectively a ban on exporting specimens. Researchers are not allowed to take samples or even digital information out of the country, except for procedures that cannot be done in Indonesia. Scientists who work in Indonesia without a proper permit will be blacklisted for 5 years; repeat offenders have to pay a $290,000 fine. Working without a material transfer agreement (MTA) is punishable by 2 years in prison or a $145,000 fine.

Other rules have been documented in the Nagoya Protocol which specifically regulates access to genetic resources and their fair and equitable sharing.

Examples for national research permit applications:

- Indonesia (National Research and Innovation Agency, Badan Riset dan Inovasi Nasional, or BRIN)
- Namibia (Ministry of Environment, Forestry & Tourism)

== History / Human Heritage collections ==
Dendrochronology is located on the border between biology and history. An annual ring table or tree-ring calendar is a time series of tree ring s of dendrochronological art tree. Because of the specific growth of each tree species and regional differences of climate, such a table must always refer to a single species from the same region. Important tree chronologies are:

- Hohenheimer Jahrringkalender (Hohenheim tree-ring calendar), complete 12,483 years back to 10,480 BC in the Younger Dryas
- Aegean Dendrochronology Project to 1800 BC, Bronze Age
- Belfast Chronology 5474 BC
- English standard curve to 5,012 BC
- Bristlecone Pine Chronology extends back 8500 years exists for the bristlecone pine in the Southwest US (White Mountains of California)
- Sequoiadendron giganteum Chronology

Remerkable History collections:

- The National Numismatic Collection is the national coin cabinet of the United States. The collection is part of the Smithsonian Institution's National Museum of American History. the collection contains over 1.6 million objects, including 450,000 coins, medals and decorations and 1.1 million pieces of paper money.
- The Norwegian folk music series is a scientific collection of traditional Norwegian dance music.

== Literature ==
- Pamela Ebert Flattau (Project Leader), Margaret Boeckmann, Paul Lagassla, Nyema Mitchell, Darius Singpurwalla: Preliminary Findings from the NSF Survey of Object-Based Scientific Collections: 2008 (pdf)

== See also ==
- Chemical library
- Collecting
- List of herbaria
- List of herbaria in Europe
- List of herbaria in North America

== Links ==
- http://wissenschaftliche-sammlungen.de/de/netzwerk/initiativen/
- http://www.plastercastcollection.org/en/index.php
