= Character =

Character or Characters may refer to:

== Arts, entertainment, and media ==
=== Literature ===
- Character (novel), a 1936 Dutch novel by Ferdinand Bordewijk
- Characters (Theophrastus), a classical Greek set of character sketches attributed to Theophrastus

=== Music ===
- Character (Dark Tranquillity album), 2005
- Character (Julia Kent album), 2013
- Character, an album by Rachael Sage, 2020
- Characters (John Abercrombie album), 1977
- Characters (Stevie Wonder album), 1987
- "Character", a song by Ryokuoushoku Shakai, 2022

=== Types of entity ===
- Character (arts), an agent within a work of art, including literature, drama, cinema, opera, etc.
  - Character actor, an actor known for playing unusual, eccentric or interesting characters in supporting roles
  - Character sketch or character, a literary description of a character type
- Game character (disambiguation), various types of characters in a video game or role playing game
  - Player character, as above but who is controlled or whose actions are directly chosen by a player
  - Non-player character, as above but not player-controlled, frequently abbreviated as NPC

=== Other uses in arts, entertainment, and media ===
- Character (film), a 1997 Dutch film based on Bordewijk's novel
- Charaktery, a monthly magazine in Poland
- Netflix Presents: The Characters, an improvised sketch comedy show on Netflix

== Mathematics ==
- Character (mathematics), a homomorphism from a group to a field
- Characterization (mathematics), the logical equivalency between objects of two different domains.
- Character theory, the mathematical theory of special kinds of characters associated to group representations
- Dirichlet character, a type of character in number theory
- Multiplicative character, a homomorphism from a group to the multiplicative subgroup of a field

== Morality and social science ==
- Character education, a US term for values education
- Character structure, a person's traits
- Moral character, an evaluation of a particular individual's durable moral qualities

== Symbols ==
- Character (symbol), a sign or symbol
  - Character (computing), a unit of information roughly corresponding to a grapheme

== Other uses ==
- Character (biology), the abstraction of an observable physical or biochemical trait of an organism
- Character (income tax), a type of income for tax purposes in the US
- Sacramental character, a Catholic teaching
- Neighbourhood character, the look and feel of a built environment

== See also ==
- (character) (disambiguation)
- Virtual character (disambiguation)
