= List of things described as virtual =

In various contexts, things are often described as "virtual" when they share important functional aspects with other things (real or imagined) that are or would be described as "more real".

These include the following:

== Computing ==
- Virtual airline
- Virtual appliance
- Virtual artifact
- Virtual community
- Virtual function
- Virtual inheritance
- Virtual intelligence
- Virtual machine
- Virtual memory
- Virtual reality
- Virtual world

== Education and business ==
- Virtual business
- Virtual economy
- Virtual education
- Virtual learning environment
- Virtual museum
- Virtual school
- Virtual team
- Virtual tradeshow
- Virtual university
- Virtual volunteering
- Virtual water
- Virtual workplace

== Entertainment and recreation ==
- Virtual actor
- Virtual art
- Virtual band
- Virtual character (disambiguation)
- Virtual cinematography
- Virtual concert
- Virtual event
- Virtual host
- Virtual humans
- Virtual influencer
- Virtual sex
- Virtual studio
- Virtual YouTuber

== Mathematics, physics, and medicine ==
- Virtual colonoscopy
- Virtual displacement
- Virtual image
- Virtual particle
- Virtual patient
- Virtual screening
- Virtual surgery
- Virtual work

== Philosophy ==
- Virtual (philosophy)
- Virtual artifact

== Telecommunications and electronics ==
- Virtual channel
- Virtual circuit
- Virtual ground
- Virtual queue
- Virtual touch screen

== See also ==
- Virtuality (disambiguation)
- Virtualization
- Virtually, used to modify a property in abstract algebra so that it need only hold for a subgroup of finite index
