= Humanoid =

Entity with human form or characteristics

A humanoid (/ˈhjuːmənɔɪd/; from English human and -oid "resembling") is a non-human entity with human form or characteristics. By the 20th century, the term came to describe fossils which were morphologically similar, but not identical, to those of the human skeleton.

Although this usage was common in the sciences for much of the 20th century, it is now considered rare. More generally, the term can refer to anything with distinctly human characteristics or adaptations, such as possessing opposable anterior forelimb-appendages (i.e. thumbs), visible spectrum-binocular vision (i.e. having two eyes), or biomechanic plantigrade-bipedalism (i.e., the ability to walk on heels and metatarsals in an upright position). Humanoids may also include human-animal hybrids (where each cell has partly human and partly animal genetic contents). Science fiction media frequently present sentient extraterrestrial lifeforms as humanoid as a byproduct of convergent evolution.

== In theoretical convergent evolution ==
Although there are no known humanoid species outside the genus Homo, the theory of convergent evolution speculates that different species may evolve similar traits, and in the case of a humanoid these traits may include intelligence and bipedalism and other humanoid skeletal changes, as a result of similar evolutionary pressures. American psychologist and Dinosaur intelligence theorist Harry Jerison suggested the possibility of sapient dinosaurs. In a 1978 presentation at the American Psychological Association, he speculated that dromiceiomimus could have evolved into a highly intelligent species like human beings. In his book, Wonderful Life, Stephen Jay Gould argues if the tape of life were re-wound and played back, life would have taken a very different course. Simon Conway Morris counters this argument, arguing that convergence is a dominant force in evolution and that since the same environmental and physical constraints act on all life, there is an "optimum" body plan that life will inevitably evolve toward, with evolution bound to stumble upon intelligence, a trait of primates, crows, and dolphins, at some point.

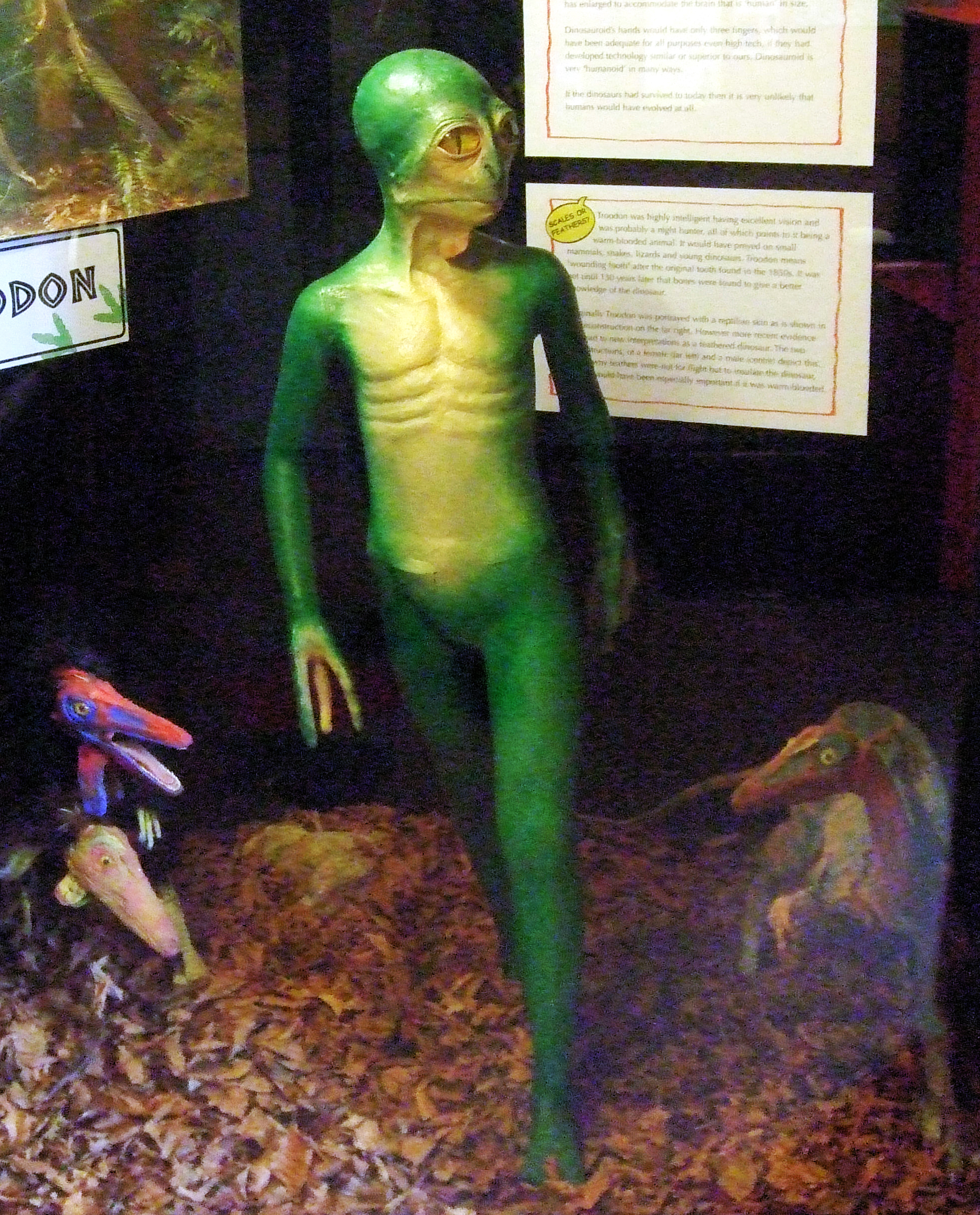
A model of the hypothetical Dinosauroid, Dinosaur Museum, Dorchester

In 1982, Dale Russell, curator of vertebrate fossils at the National Museum of Canada in Ottawa, conjectured a possible evolutionary path that might have been taken by the dinosaur Troodon had it not perished in the Cretaceous–Paleogene extinction event 66 million years ago, suggesting that it could have evolved into intelligent beings similar in body plan to humans, becoming a humanoid of dinosaur origin. Over geologic time, Russell noted that there had been a steady increase in the encephalization quotient or EQ (the relative brain weight when compared to other species with the same body weight) among the dinosaurs. Russell had discovered the first Troodontid skull, and noted that, while its EQ was low compared to humans, it was six times higher than that of other dinosaurs. If the trend in Troodon evolution had continued to the present, its brain case could by now measure 1,100 cm^{3}; comparable to that of a human. Troodontids had semi-manipulative fingers, able to grasp and hold objects to a certain degree, and binocular vision.

Russell proposed that this "Dinosauroid", like most dinosaurs of the troodontid family, would have had large eyes and three fingers on each hand, one of which would have been partially opposed. As with most modern reptiles (and birds), he conceived of its genitalia as internal. Russell speculated that it would have required a navel, as a placenta aids the development of a large brain case. However, it would not have possessed mammary glands and would have fed its young, as birds do, on regurgitated food. He speculated that its language would have sounded somewhat like bird song.

Russell's thought experiment has been met with criticism from other paleontologists since the 1980s, many of whom point out that his Dinosauroid is overly anthropomorphic. Gregory S. Paul (1988) and Thomas R. Holtz, Jr., consider it "suspiciously human" (Paul, 1988) and Darren Naish has argued that a large-brained, highly intelligent troodontid would retain a more standard theropod body plan, with a horizontal posture and long tail, and would probably manipulate objects with the snout and feet in the manner of a bird, rather than with human-like "hands". (Although bipedal dinosaurs often do have hands, if they don't turn them into wings.)

== In robotics ==
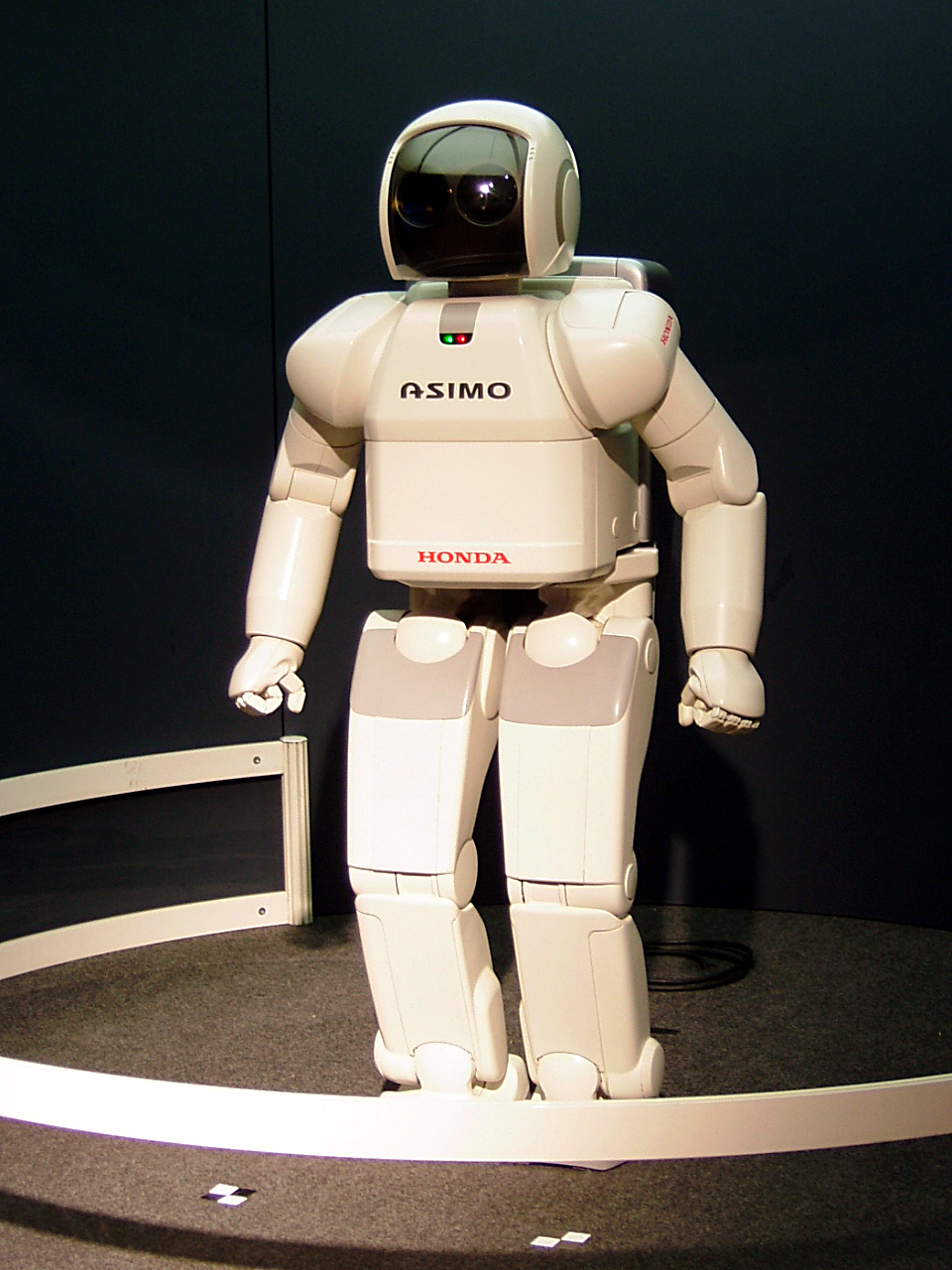
Honda's ASIMO is an example of a humanoid robot.

A humanoid robot is a robot that is based on the general structure of a human, such as a robot that walks on two legs and has an upper torso, or a robot that has two arms, two legs and a head. A humanoid robot does not necessarily look convincingly like a real person, for example, the ASIMO humanoid robot has a helmet instead of a face.

An android (male) or gynoid (female) is a humanoid robot designed to look as much like a real person as possible, although these words are frequently perceived to be synonymous with a humanoid.

While there are many humanoid robots in fictional stories, some real humanoid robots have been developed since the 1990s, and some real human-looking android robots have been developed since 2002.

Similarly to robots, virtual avatars or characters may also be called humanoid when resembling humans.

== In mythology ==
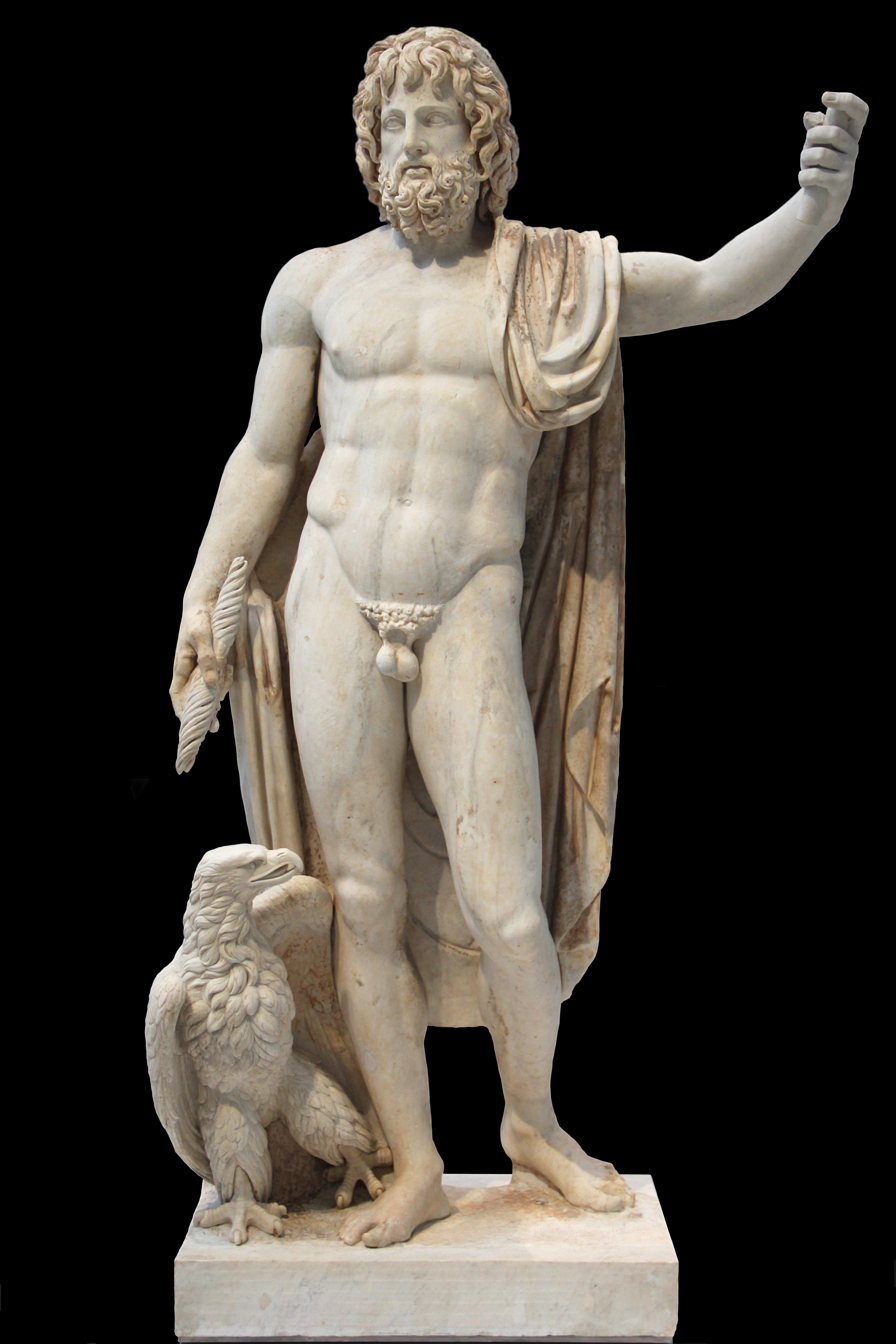
Marble statue of Jupiter

Deities are often imagined in human shape (also known as "anthropotheism"), sometimes as hybrids (especially the gods of Ancient Egyptian religion). A fragment by the Greek poet Xenophanes describes this tendency,

...Men make gods in their own image; those of the Ethiopians are black and narrow-nosed, those of the Thracians have blue eyes and red hair.

In animism in general, the spirits innate in certain objects (like the Greek nymphs) are typically depicted in human shape, e.g. spirits of trees (Dryads), of the woodlands (the hybrid fauns), of wells or waterways (Nereids, Necks), etc.

== In ufology ==
In the field of ufology, humanoid refers to many of the claimed extraterrestrials (including those which abduct human victims), such as the Greys, the Reptilians, Nordics, and Martians.

== In fiction ==
=== Fantasy ===
In fantasy settings the term humanoid is used to refer to a human-like fantastical creature, such as a dwarf, elf, gnome, halfling, goblin, troll, orc or an ogre, and Bigfoot. In some cases, such as older versions of the game Dungeons & Dragons, a distinction is made between demi-humans, which are relatively similar to humans, and humanoids, which exhibit larger differences from humans. Animals that are humanoid are also shown in fantasy. Humanoids are also used in some old horror movies, for example in Creature From the Black Lagoon, made in 1954 by Jack Arnold.

Humanoid characters are defined by their human-like physical characteristics and forms, which can vary. In fictional media, humanoid characters can appear entirely human (e.g., Saiyans from Dragon Ball Z), predominantly human-like (e.g., Gems from Steven Universe), or they may possess general non-human traits combined with human traits (e.g., anthropomorphic animals, notably characters from The Amazing World of Gumball).

=== Science fiction ===
With regard to extraterrestrials in fiction, the term humanoid is most commonly used to refer to alien beings with a body plan that is generally like that of a human, including upright stance and bipedalism, as well as intelligence.

In much of science fiction, humanoid aliens are abundant. One explanation is that authors use the only example of intelligent life that they know, humans. In live-action television and films, using humanoid aliens makes it easier to cast human actors to portray alien characters. A study by the zoologist Sam Levin suggests that aliens might indeed resemble humans, given that they are presumably subject to natural selection. Levin argues that this can be expected to produce a hierarchy of cooperating systems that make up any organism. Luis Villazon points out that animals that move necessarily have a front and a back; as with animals on Earth, sense organs tend to gather at the front as they encounter stimuli there, forming a head. Legs reduce friction, and with legs, bilateral symmetry makes coordination easier. Sentient organisms will, Villazon argues, likely use tools, in which case they need hands and at least two other limbs to stand on. In short, a generally humanoid shape is likely, though octopus or starfish-like bodies are also possible. An opposing view is given by Mike Wall, who argues that intelligent extraterrestrials able to contact humans would most likely have reached a phase allowing them to develop themselves into machines.

Several in-universe explanations have been offered for the abundance of humanoids. One of the more common is that the humanoids in the story have evolved on an Earth-like planet or natural satellite, totally independently from humans on Earth. However, some works have offered alternative explanations:

In Star Trek, the explanation is given that a primordial humanoid civilization, the Ancient humanoids, seeded the Milky Way Galaxy with genetically engineered cells to guide the evolution of life on a multitude of worlds toward a humanoid form. In the television series Stargate SG-1, the Jaffa are explained as being a hundred-thousand year offshoot of humanity bred by the Goa'uld to suit their purposes, hence their almost-human appearance and physiology, while many other "alien" characters are actually the descendants of human-slaves who were removed from Earth by the Goa'uld. Any humans isolated on multiple planets after 100,000+ years of adaptations would most certainly seem "alien" to Earthlings. Similarly, in its spin-off show Stargate Atlantis, the explanation offered for the humanoid appearance of the Wraith is that the Wraith evolved from a parasite which incorporated human DNA into its own genome after feeding on humans, giving the Wraith their present form.

=== Other fiction ===
Vampires are fictional humanoid creatures with their origins in European folklore and mythology. Vampires are light-skinned human like creatures that prey on humans and other animals by sucking their blood with two sharp fangs. Vampires usually dress in dark suits with capes (e.g., Dracula from Hotel Transylvania)

Mary Shelley's novel "Frankenstein; or, The Modern Prometheus" (1818) is about an artificially created being with a human like form. Victor Frankenstein assembles the creature from human remains and brings it to life. Although the creature initially seeks affection, rejection and isolation lead it to turn against its creator.

== See also ==
- Primate
- Anthropomorphism
- Hominid (term)
- Human disguise
- Panspermia
- Race (fantasy)
- Robotics

Lists

- Lists of humanoids
  - List of humanoid aliens
  - List of avian humanoids
  - List of piscine and amphibian humanoids
  - List of reptilian humanoids
