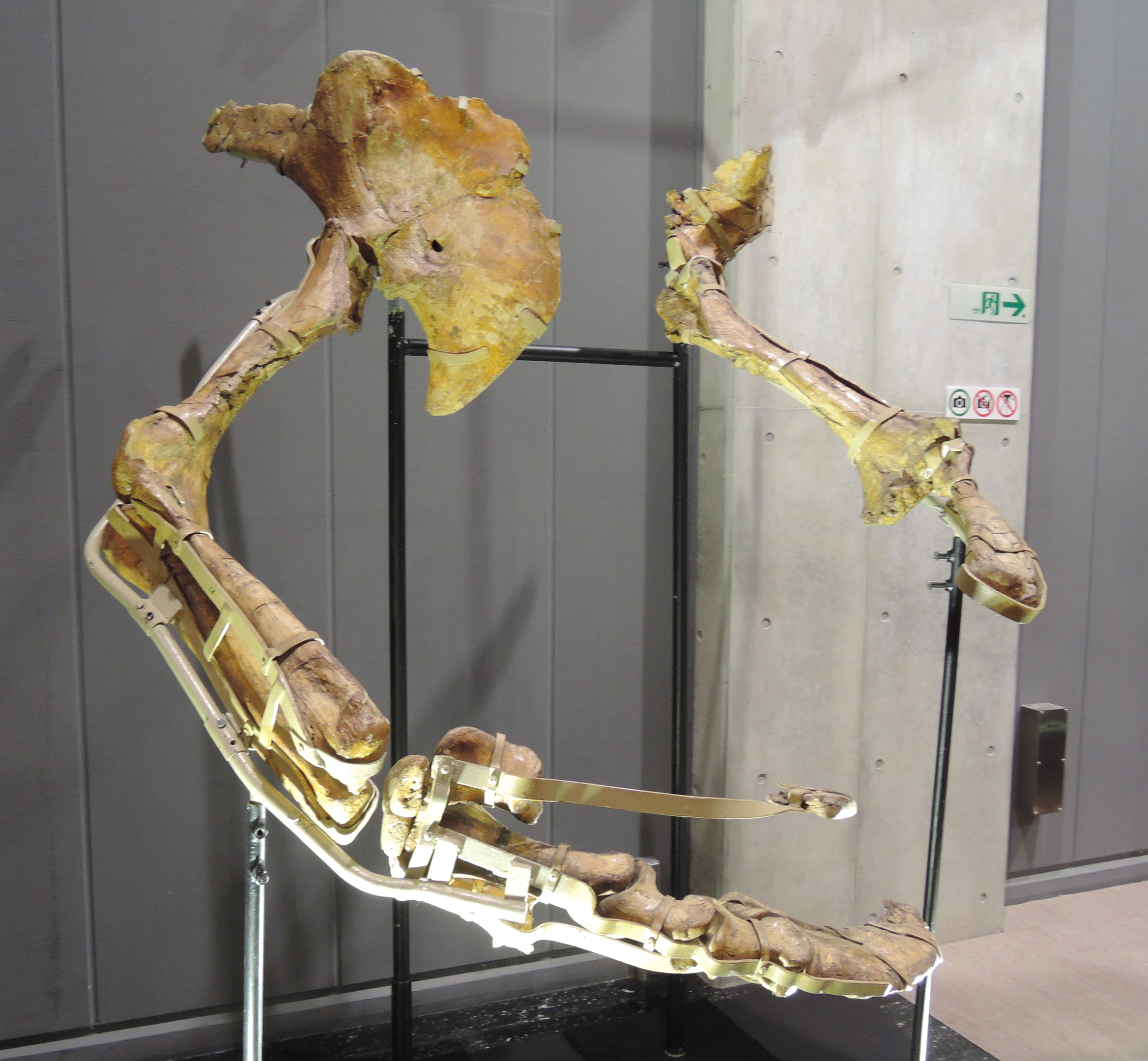
- Mounted forelimbs of specimen MPC-D 100/15 at Nagoya City Science Museum

Scientific classification
- Kingdom: Animalia
- Phylum: Chordata
- Class: Reptilia
- Clade: Dinosauria
- Clade: Saurischia
- Clade: Theropoda
- Superfamily: †Therizinosauroidea
- Family: †Therizinosauridae
- Genus: †Therizinosaurus; Maleev, 1954

Type species
- †Therizinosaurus cheloniformis Maleev, 1954

= Therizinosaurus =

Therizinosaurus Temporal range: Late Cretaceous, Maastrichtian

Dinosaur genus from the Late Cretaceous period

Therizinosaurus (/ˌθɛrəˌzɪnoʊˈsɔːrəs/; meaning 'scythe lizard') is a genus of very large therizinosaurid dinosaurs that lived in the Maastrichtian age during the Late Cretaceous period in what is now Asia roughly 69-66 million years ago. It contains a single species, Therizinosaurus cheloniformis, known from the fossiliferous Nemegt Formation. The first remains of Therizinosaurus were found in 1948 by a Mongolian field expedition in the Gobi Desert and later described by Evgeny Maleev in 1954. The genus is only known from a few bones, including gigantic manual unguals (claw bones), from which it gets its name, and additional findings comprising fore and hindlimb elements that were discovered from the 1960s through the 1980s.

Therizinosaurus was a colossal therizinosaurid that could grow up to 9–10 m (30–33 ft) long and 4–5 m (13–16 ft) tall, and weigh possibly over 5 t (5.5 short tons). Like other therizinosaurids, it would have been a slow-moving, long-necked, high browser equipped with a rhamphotheca (beak) and a wide torso for food processing. Its forelimbs were particularly robust and had three fingers that bore unguals which, unlike other relatives, were very stiffened, elongated, and only had significant curvatures at the tips. Therizinosaurus had the longest known manual unguals of any land animal, reaching above 50 cm (20 in) in length. Its hindlimbs ended in four functionally weight-bearing toes differing from other theropod groups in which the first toe was reduced to a dewclaw and also resembling the very distantly related sauropodomorphs.

It was one of the last and the largest representative of its unique group, the Therizinosauria (formerly known as Segnosauria; the segnosaurs). During and after its original description in 1954, Therizinosaurus had rather complex relationships due to the lack of complete specimens and relatives at the time. Maleev thought the remains of Therizinosaurus to belong to a large turtle-like reptile, and also named a separate family for the genus: Therizinosauridae. Later on, with the discovery of more complete relatives, Therizinosaurus and kin were thought to represent some kind of Late Cretaceous sauropodomorphs or transitional ornithischians, even though at some point it was suggested that it may have been a theropod. After years of taxonomic debate, nevertheless, they are now placed in one of the major dinosaur clades, Theropoda, specifically as maniraptorans. Therizinosaurus is widely recovered within Therizinosauridae by most analyses.

The unusual arms and body anatomy (extrapolated after relatives) of Therizinosaurus have been cited as an example of convergent evolution with chalicotheriines and other primarily herbivorous mammals like ground sloths, suggesting similar feeding habits. The elongated hand claws of Therizinosaurus were possibly more efficient at pulling vegetation within reach than being used for active attack or defense because it has been believed they would have been relatively fragile. However, Its arms were found to have been particularly resistant to stress, which suggests a robust and versatile use of these limbs ranging from both foraging and self defense. Therizinosaurus was a very tall animal, likely having a reduced competition over the foliage in its habitat and rivalling predators like the tyrannosaurid Tarbosaurus in size.

== History of discovery ==
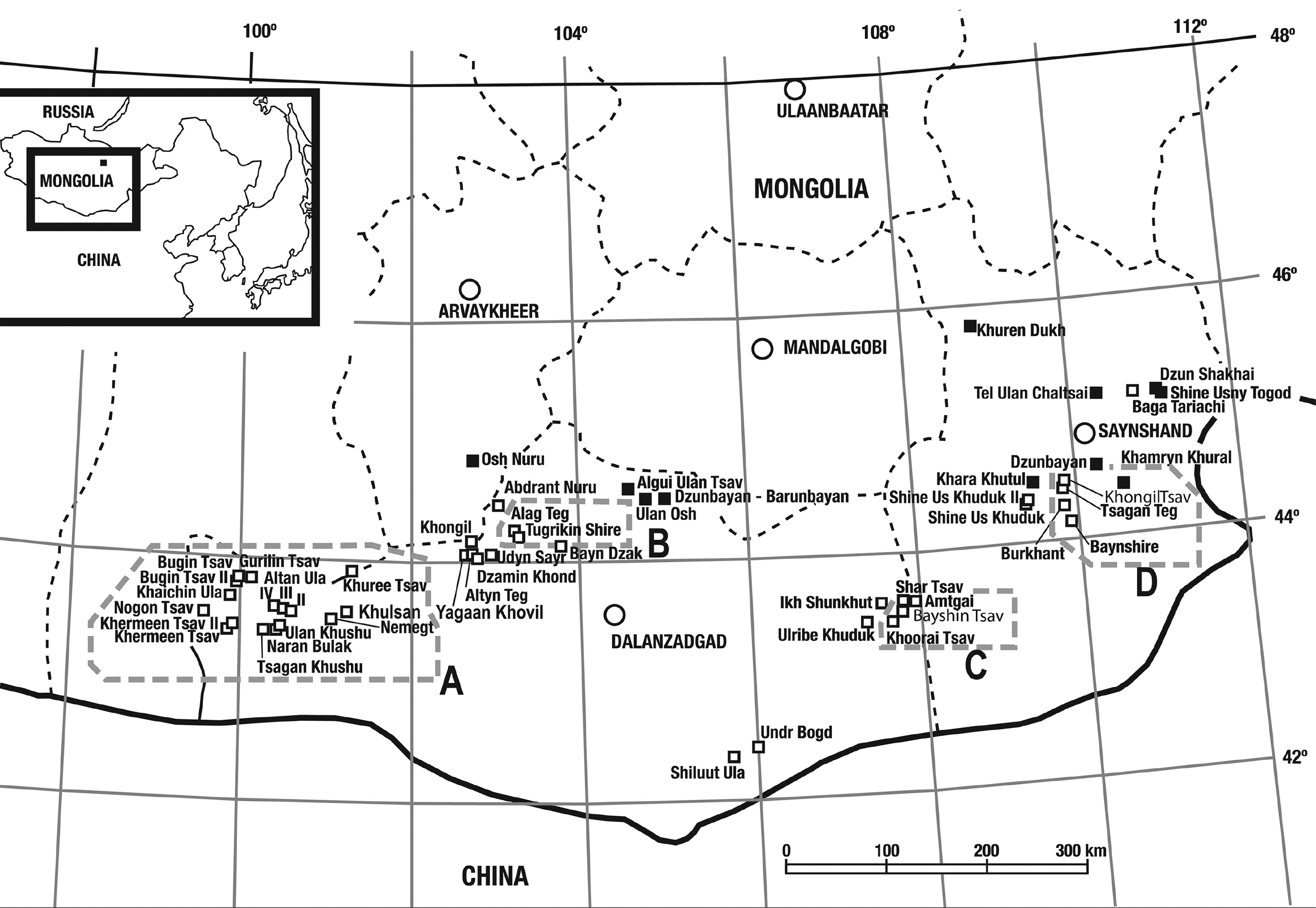
Cretaceous fossil localities of Mongolia; Therizinosaurus fossils have been collected from the Altan Uul, Hermiin Tsav, and Nemegt localities at the area A (Nemegt Formation)

In 1948, several Mongolian Paleontological expeditions organized by the USSR Academy of Sciences were conducted in the Nemegt Formation of the Gobi Desert, Southwestern Mongolia, with the main objective of new fossils findings. The expeditions unearthed numerous dinosaur and turtle fossil remains from the stratotype locality Nemegt (also known as Nemegt Valley), but the most notable elements collected were three partial manual unguals (claw bones) of considerable size. This set of unguals was found on a subdivision of the Nemegt locality designated as Quarry V near the skeleton of a large theropod, but also in association with other elements including a metacarpal fragment and several ribs fragments. It was labelled under the specimen number PIN 551-483 and later on, these fossils were described by the Russian paleontologist Evgeny Maleev in 1954 who used them to scientifically name the new genus and type species Therizinosaurus cheloniformis, becoming the holotype specimen. The generic name, Therizinosaurus, is derived from the Greek θερίζω (therízo, meaning scythe, reap or cut) and σαῦρος (sauros, meaning lizard) in reference to the enormous manual unguals, and the specific name, cheloniformis, is taken from the Greek χελώνη (chelóni, meaning turtle) and Latin formis as the remains were thought to belong to a turtle-like reptile. Maleev also coined a separate family for this new and enigmatic taxon: Therizinosauridae. Since little was known of Therizinosaurus at the time of the original description, Maleev thought PIN 551-483 belonged to a large, 4.5 m (15 ft) long turtle-like reptile that relied on its giant hand claws to harvest seaweed.

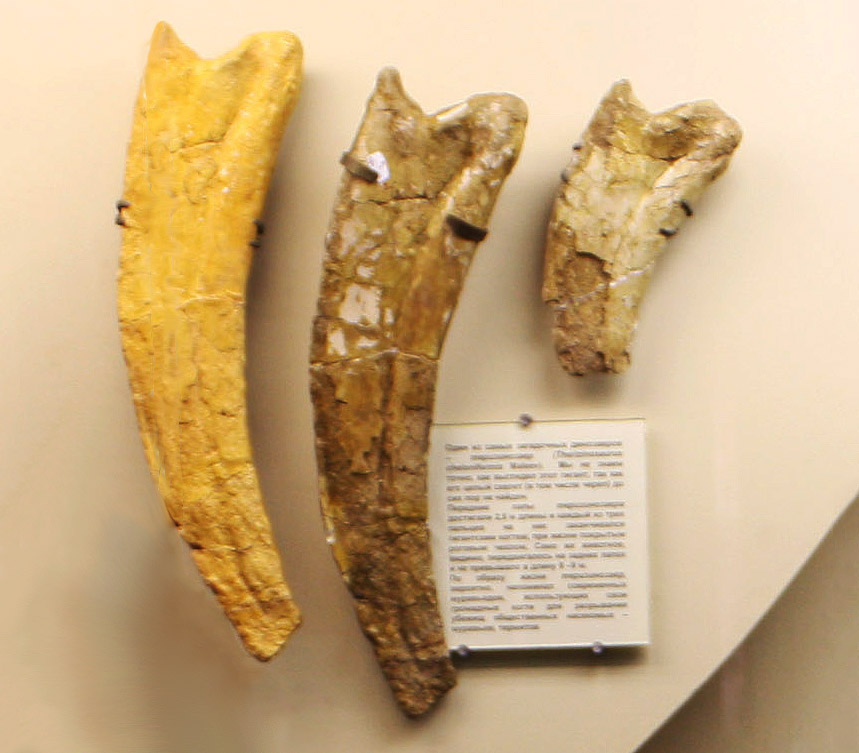
Holotype unguals PIN 551–483 at the Moscow Paleontological Museum; note left ungual cast

Though it was not fully understood to what general kind of animal these fossils belonged, in 1970, the Russian paleontologist Anatoly K. Rozhdestvensky was one of the first authors to suggest that Therizinosaurus was a theropod and not a turtle. He made comparisons between Chilantaisaurus and the holotype unguals of Therizinosaurus to propose that the appendages actually came from a carnosaurian dinosaur, thereby interpreting Therizinosaurus as a theropod. Rozhdestvensky also illustrated the three holotypic manual unguals and re-identified the metacarpal fragment as a metatarsal bone, and based on the unusual shape of both metatarsal and ribs fragments he listed them as sauropod remains. These theropodan affinities were also followed by the Polish paleontologist Halszka Osmólska and co-author Ewa Roniewicz in 1970 during their naming and description of Deinocheirus—another large and enigmatic theropod from the formation that was initially known from partial arms. Similar to Rozhdestvensky, they suggested that the holotype unguals were more likely to have belonged to a carnosaurian theropod, rather than a large marine turtle.

=== Additional specimens ===
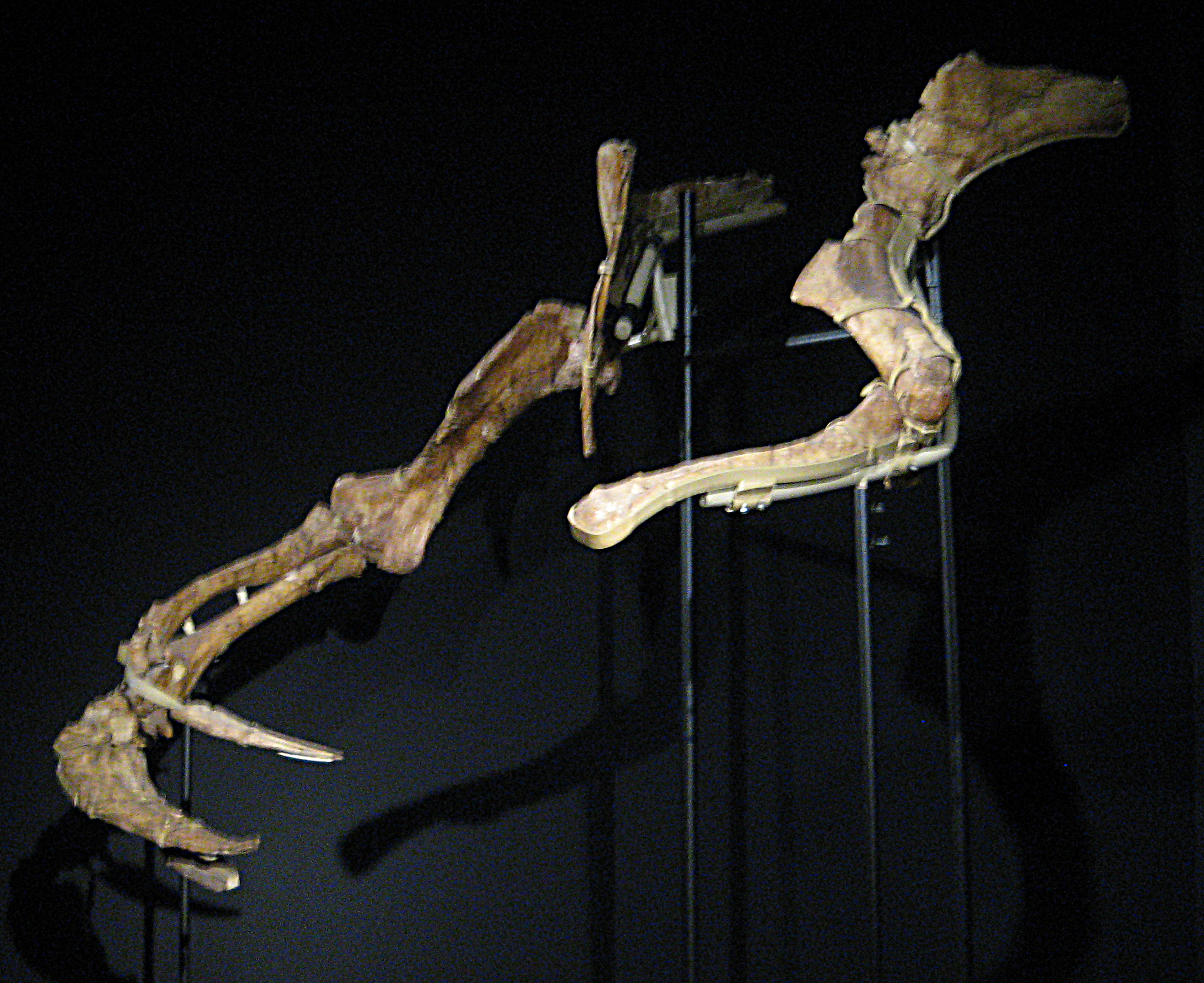
Arms of specimen MPC-D 100/15 with unguals 100/16 and 100/17 at CosmoCaixa Barcelona

Further expeditions in the Nemegt Formation unearthed more fossils of Therizinosaurus. In 1968 prior to Rozhdestvensky, Osmólska and Roniewicz statements, the upper portion of a manual ungual was found in the Altan Uul locality and labeled as MPC-D 100/17 (formerly IGM or GIN). In 1972, another fragmented ungual (specimen MPC-D 100/16) was discovered at the Upper White Beds of the Hermiin Tsav locality, only preserving its lower portion. During the year 1973, a much more complete, larger, and articulated specimen was collected also from Hermiin Tsav. This specimen was labelled as MPC-D 100/15 and consists of both left and right arms including the scapulocoracoids, both humeri (upper arm bones), right ulna with radius and left ulna, two right carpals, the right metacarpus including a complete digit Il, and some ribs with gastralia (belly ribs). As common with fossils, some elements were not entirely preserved such as the scapulocoracoids with broken ends, and the left arm is less complete than the right one. All of these specimens were first described and referred to Therizinosaurus by the Mongolian paleontologist Rinchen Barsbold in 1976. In this new monograph, he pointed out that the rib fragments in MPC-D 100/15 were more slender than the ones from the holotype, and identified MPC-D 100/16 and 100/17 as pertaining to digits I and III, respectively. It was clear to Barsbold that MPC-D 100/15 represented Therizinosaurus as the ungual in this specimen shared the elongation and flattened morphology of all previous specimens. He concluded that Therizinosaurus was a theropod taxon since MPC-D 100/15 matched multiple theropodan characters.

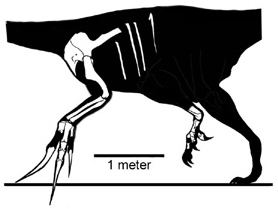
Composite skeletal of the known remains of Therizinosaurus

Also during the year 1973, the specimen MPC-D 100/45 was discovered by the Joint Soviet-Mongolian Paleontological Expedition at the Hermiin Tsav locality. Unlike the previous findings, MPC-D 100/45 is represented by a right hindlimb composed of a very fragmented femur with the lower end of the tibia, astragalus, calcaneum, tarsal IV, a functional tetradactyl feet (four-toed) compromising four partial metatarsals, partially preserved digits I and III, and nearly complete digits II and IV. These newer remains were described by the also Mongolian paleontologist Altangerel Perle in 1982. He regarded the referral of Therizinosaurus and Therizinosauridae to Chelonia (turtles order) to be unlikely, and hypothesized Therizinosaurus and Segnosaurus—at the time of this description regarded as a theropod dinosaur—to be particularly similar based on their respective scapulocoracoid morphology, only differing in size. Perle referred MPC-D 100/45 to Therizinosaurus given that this specimen was found near the location of MPC-D 100/15 and was virtually similar to the described pes for Segnosaurus. In 1990, Barsbold and Teresa Maryanska agreed with Perle in that the hindlimb material from Hermiin Tsav he described in 1982 was therizinosaurian (then called segnosaurians) given that the metatarsus was stocky and the astragalus had a laterally arched ascending process (bony extension), but cast doubt with his referral of it to Therizinosaurus and the segnosaurian identity for this taxon since it was only known from the pectoral girdle and other forelimb elements, making direct comparisons between specimens impossible. They considered this specimen to represent a Late Cretaceous representative of the Segnosauria, but not Therizinosaurus.

In 2010 however, the North American paleontologist Lindsay E. Zanno in her large taxonomic reevaluation of Therizinosauria considered the referral of MPC-D 100/45 to Therizinosaurus to be likely based on the rationale that it was collected in the same stratigraphic context (Nemegt Formation) as the holotype, and shared the robust and four-toed morphology of other therizinosaurids such as Segnosaurus. She also excluded the rib material from the holotype as it was re-identified by Rozhdestvensky to likely have come from a sauropod dinosaur, and not Therizinosaurus itself.

== Description ==
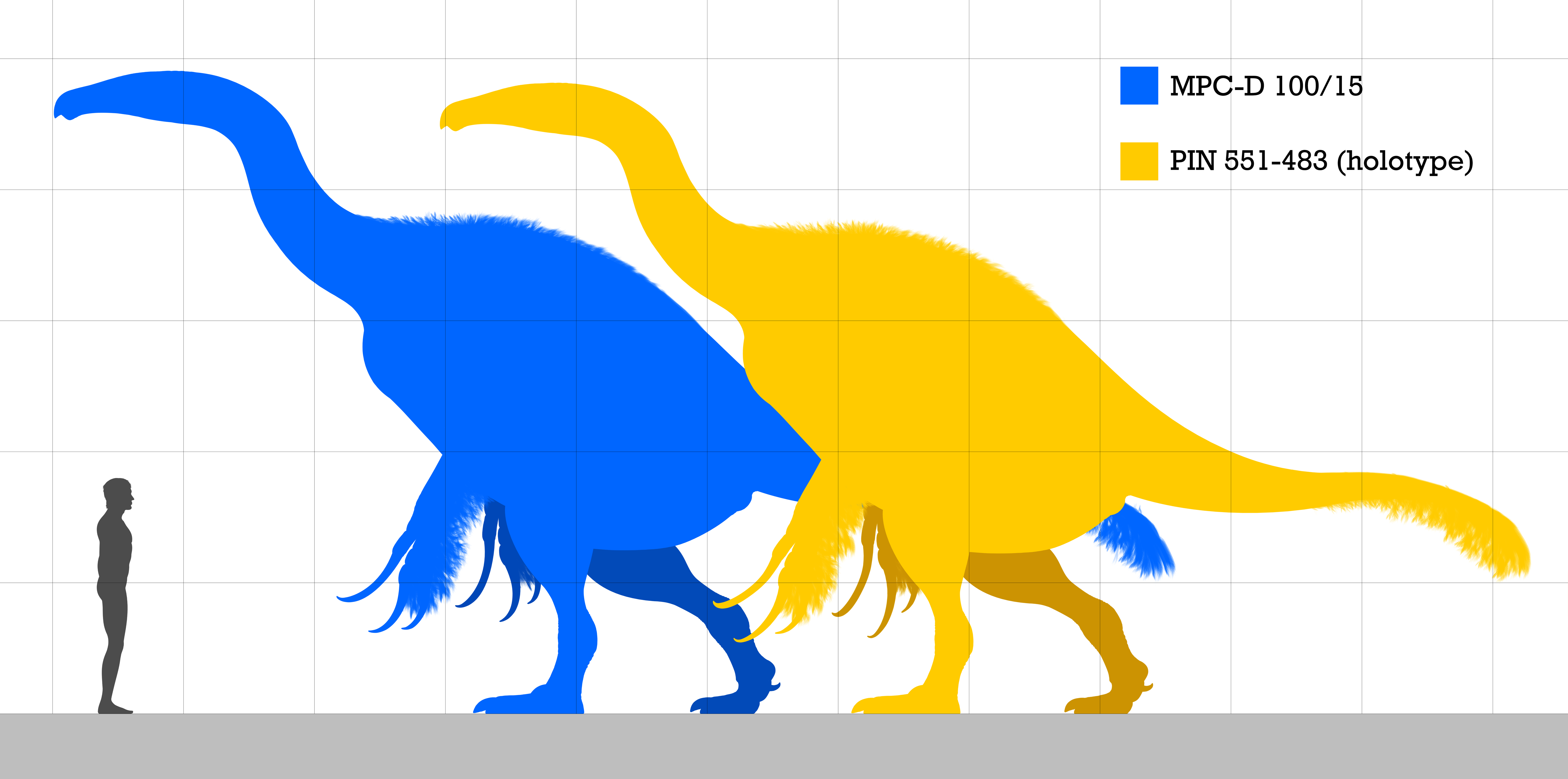
Size of two specimens (holotype in yellow, right) compared to a 1.8 m (5.9 ft) tall human

By maniraptoran standards, Therizinosaurus attained enormous sizes, estimated to have reached 9 to 10 m (30 to 33 ft) in length. In 2010, Gregory S. Paul estimated in his book The Princeton Field Guide to Dinosaurs that the animal weighed around 3 tons. However, the estimate was revised to 5 to 10 t (5.5 to 11.0 short tons) in a subsequent edition. In 2012, Thomas R. Holtz Jr. claimed that the animal weighs as much as an elephant. In 2013, Lindsay E. Zanno and Peter J. Makovicky estimated that Therizinosaurus weighed around 6.6 t (7.3 short tons). These dimensions make Therizinosaurus the largest known therizinosaur and the largest known maniraptoran. Along with the contemporaneous ornithomimosaur Deinocheirus, it was the largest maniraptoriform. Though body remains of Therizinosaurus are relatively incomplete, inferences can be made about its physical characteristics based on more complete relatives. Like other members of its family, Therizinosaurus had a proportionally small skull, bearing a rhamphotheca (horny beak), atop a long neck; a semi-erect, bipedal gait; a large gut for foliage processing; and sparse feathering. Other traits that were likely present in Therizinosaurus include a heavily pneumatized (air-filled) vertebral column and a robustly-built, ophistopubic (backwards oriented) pelvis.

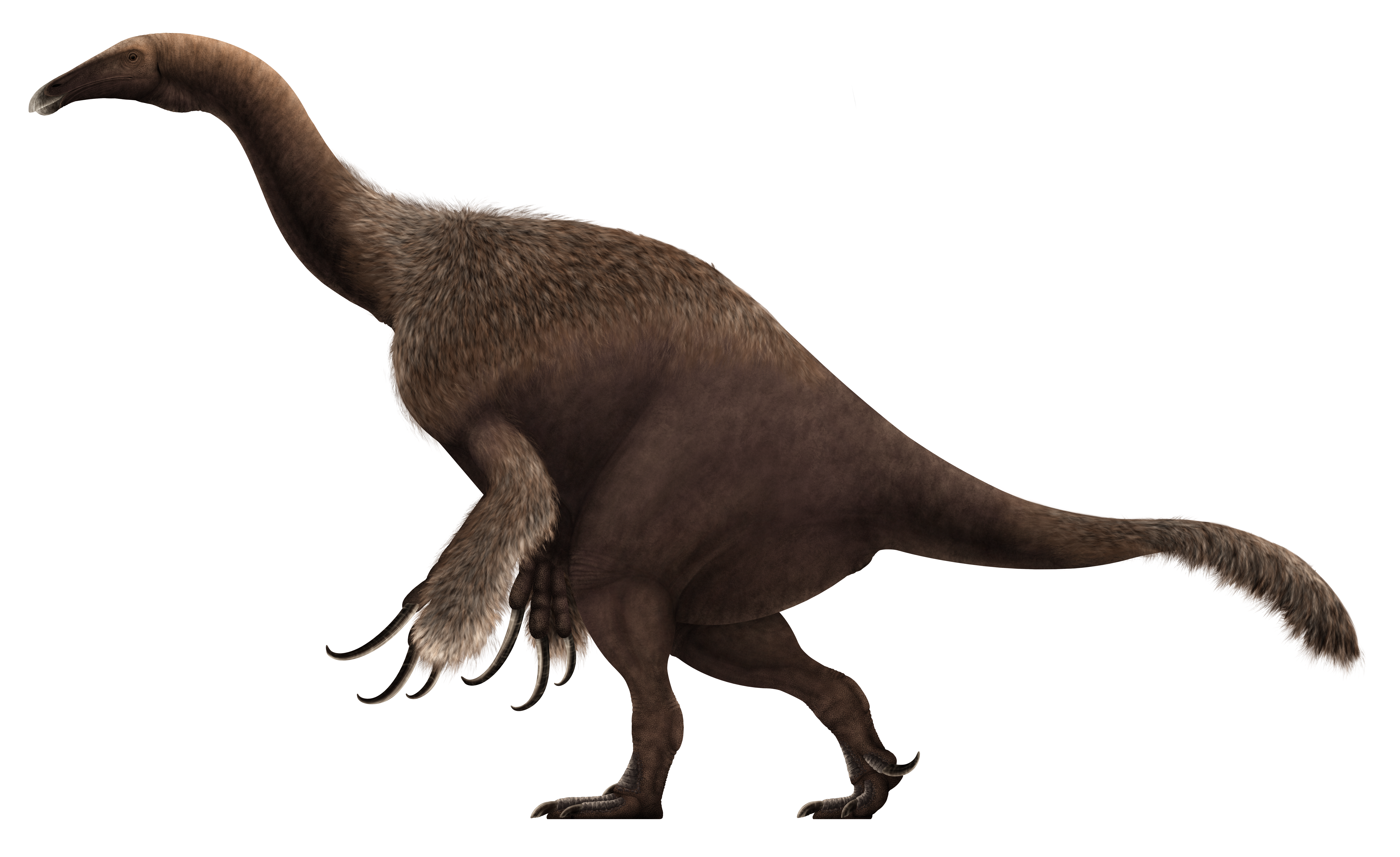
Life restoration

In 2010, Senter and James used hindlimb length equations to predict the total length of the hindlimbs in Therizinosaurus and Deinocheirus. They concluded that an average Therizinosaurus may have had approximately 3 m (9.8 ft) long legs. More recently, Mike Taylor and Matt Wedel suggested that the whole neck would be 2.9 times the size of the humerus, which was 76 cm (760 mm), resulting in a 2.2 m (7.2 ft) long neck based on comparisons with the cervical vertebrae series of Nanshiungosaurus. The most distinctive feature of Therizinosaurus was the presence of gigantic unguals on each of the three digits of its hands. These were common among therizinosaurs but particularly large and stiffened in Therizinosaurus, and they are considered as the longest known from any terrestrial animal.

=== Forelimbs ===
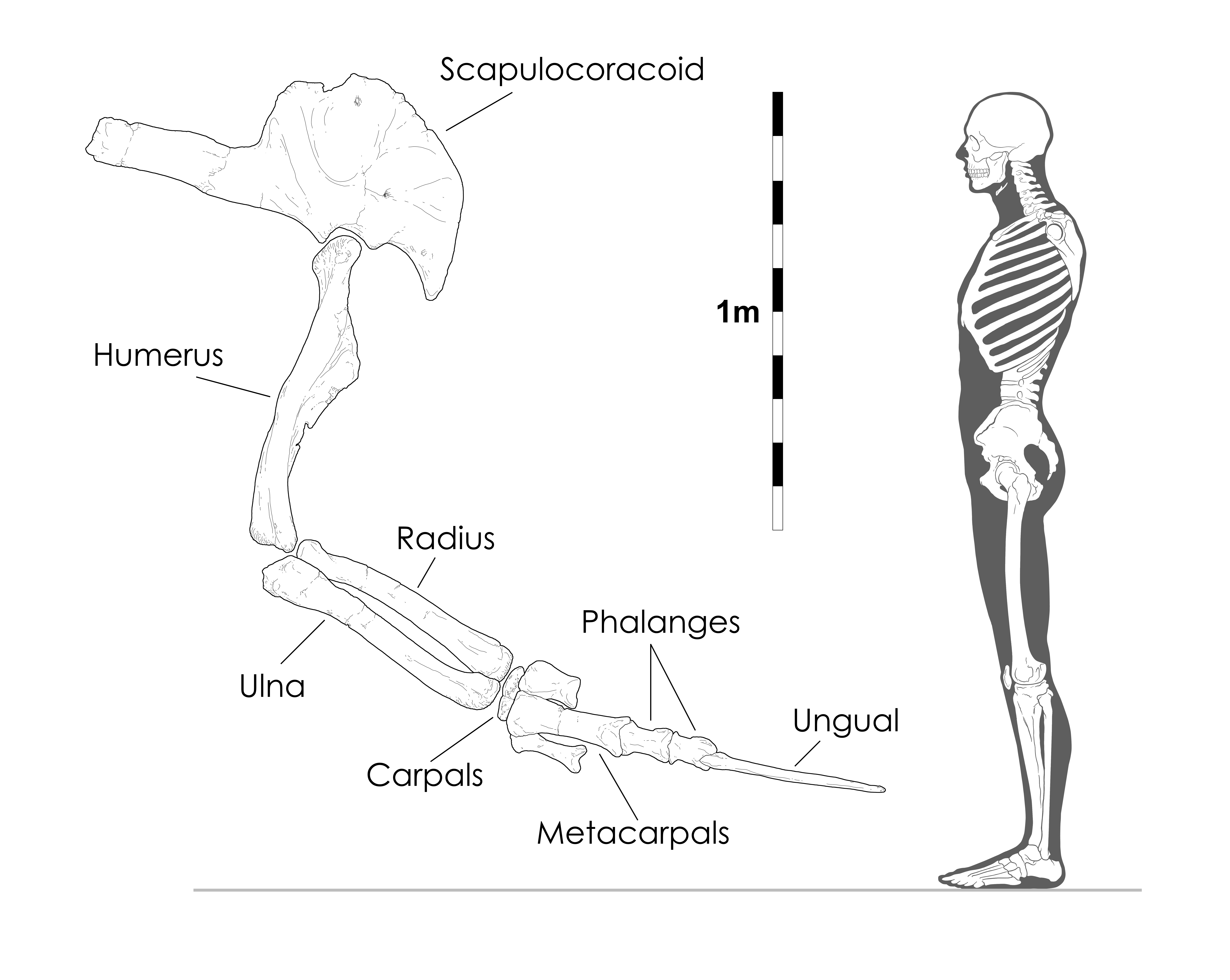
Diagram of the right arm and shoulder blade (rotated) of MPC-D 100/15

The arm of Therizinosaurus covered 2.4 m (7.9 ft) in total length (humerus, radius and second metacarpal with phalanges lengths). The scapula measured 67 cm (26 in) long with a stocky and flattened dorsal blade, wide acromial process (bony extension) and a very widened ventral surface. Near the anterior (front) edge of the scapular widening and near the scapulocoracoid suture (bone joint), a foramen was located; it likely functioned as a channel for blood vessels and nerves. The posterior (rear) edge of the scapula was robust and the acromion was lightly built, likely fused into a cartilaginous system with its periphery in life. The coracoid measured 36 cm (14 in) in length. It had a broad and convex lateral surface that formed a slightly inclined concavity near of the scapulocoracoid suture. This concavity bent down towards the scapular widening. Near the scapulocoracoid suture, this edge turned very thin and possibly into cartilage along with the periphery of the coracoid in life, as the case of the scapular edge. A large foramen was also present on the coracoid. The glenoid was broad and deep, slightly pointing to the outer lateral side. It had robust and convex crest-like borders. The supraglenoid thickness was developed in a convex crest-shaped form, it was divided across the top of the scapulocoracoid suture. The attachment for the biceps muscle was prominently developed by a large tubercle with a stocky top, indicating powerful musculature.

The humerus was robustly built, measuring 76 cm (30 in) long. It had a broad upper end. The deltopectoral crest (deltoid muscle attachment) was particularly long and thick, with its top located approximately 1/3 from the upper end. The length of the crest was no less than 2/3 the length of the whole bone element. The lower end of the humerus was very expanded and flared. The condyles were developed onto the anterior side of the lower expansion while the epicondyles were very broad and projected over the limits of the articular areas. The ulna measured 62.02 cm (24.42 in) and most of its length was occupied by its straight shaft. The ulnar process was very wide. The upper articular area was divided into medial (inner) and lateral (outer) sides. The lateral side had a triangular-shaped border and was slightly concave; it was limited in a top view by the depression for the upper articulation of the radius. The inner side formed a semilunar-shaped depression that covered the lunar-shaped condyle of the humerus. The radius was 55.04 cm (21.67 in) long and slightly S-curved. Its upper end was flattened in a lateral direction, very wide, and the distal end was highly robust.

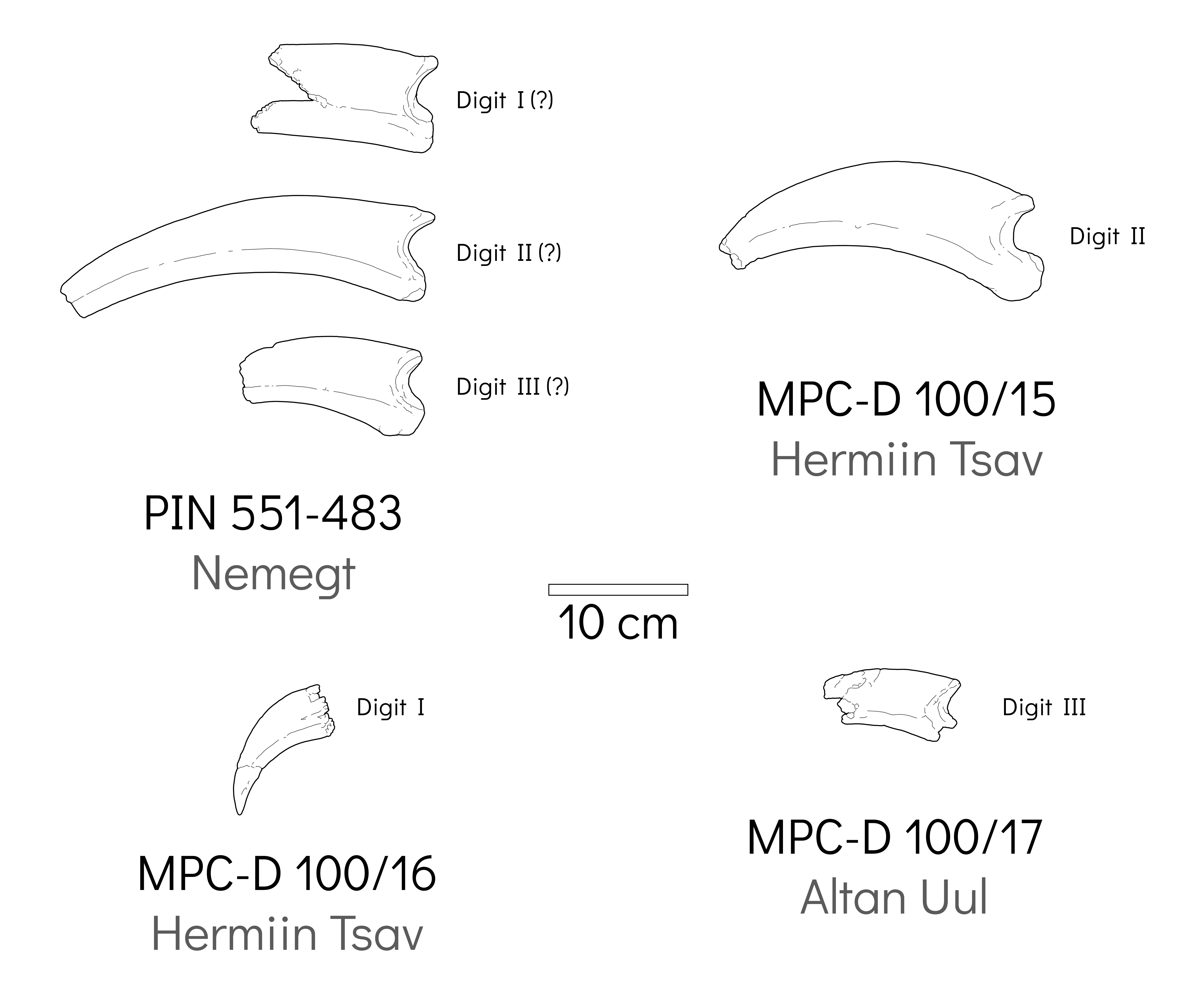
Skeletal diagram featuring the known unguals of Therizinosaurus

The first lower carpal bone (wrist bone) measured 8.23 cm (3.24 in) tall and 8.53 cm (3.36 in) wide and had two articulation surfaces on its lowermost end. The upper surface of this carpal was divided by a broad depression that formed the articulation of the carpus. On its medial side, it was triangular in outline, and here it attached to the upper surface of the first metacarpal (hand bone). The second lower carpal was smaller than the first, measuring 5.6 cm (2.2 in) tall and 5.93 cm (2.33 in) wide. Its distal surface was flattened, and the articular surface of the carpus extended from the first carpal to the second carpal across the point where the two bones articulated.

The first metacarpal was 14.55 cm (5.73 in) long and was more robust than the others. Its lateral side was broad, especially on the uppermost area; the inner border was thin and narrow. The upper articulation was configured into three parts. The lower articular surface was asymmetric and bent to the inner side from the left one, along with a wide and deep opening. The total length of this metacarpal was larger than 2/3 the length of metacarpal III, which may have been a unique trait of Therizinosaurus. The second metacarpal measured 28.68 cm (11.29 in) in length, and was the largest. It had an inclined, square-shaped, and flattened upper articulation. The articulation on the lower head had very symmetrical condyles, being divided by a broad, deep depression. The lateral connecting openings were poorly developed. The third metacarpal was 19.16 cm (7.54 in) in length and had a very thin shaft compared to the others. Its upper articulation was divided into three parts. The lower articular head was asymmetrical with deep and broad openings. As in the second metacarpal, the lateral connecting openings were poorly developed.

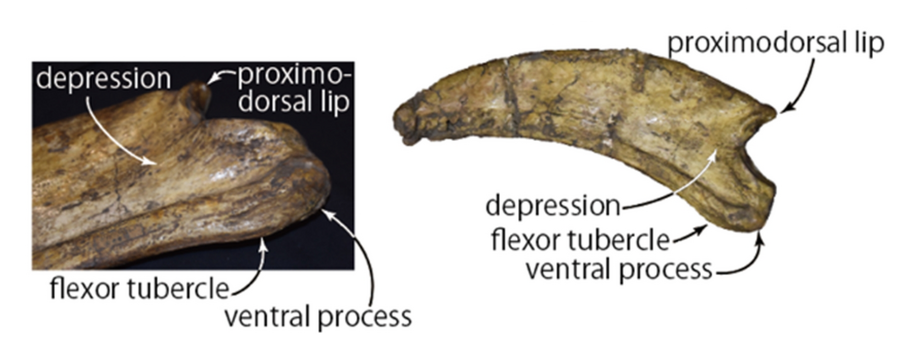
Highlighted regions of Therizinosaurus MPC-D 100/15 ungual

Only the second digit of the manus is known in Therizinosaurus. It consisted of two phalanges (digit bones) and a large ungual (the distal phalanx which would have supported a claw in life). The first and second phalanges were somewhat equal in shape and length, 14.17 cm (5.58 in) and 14.38 cm (5.66 in), respectively, and were similar in shape. The upper articular facets were symmetrical and had a crest, taller in the first phalanx. The proximal (closer to the body) border of this crest was very pointed and thick; it likely served as the site for attachment of the extensor tendons in life. The lower heads were nearly symmetrical, but the central depression was considerably wider and deeper in the first phalanx. The manual unguals of Therizinosaurus were especially enormous and long, estimated to have covered approximately 52 cm (20 in) in length. Unlike other therizinosaurs, they were very straight, compressed laterally (from side-to-side), and were recurved only towards the tips. The lower tubercle, where the flexor tendons attached to the ungual, was thick and robust, indicating a large pad in life. The articulation surface that connected the preceding phalanx was slightly concave, and was divided by a central ridge.

=== Hindlimbs ===
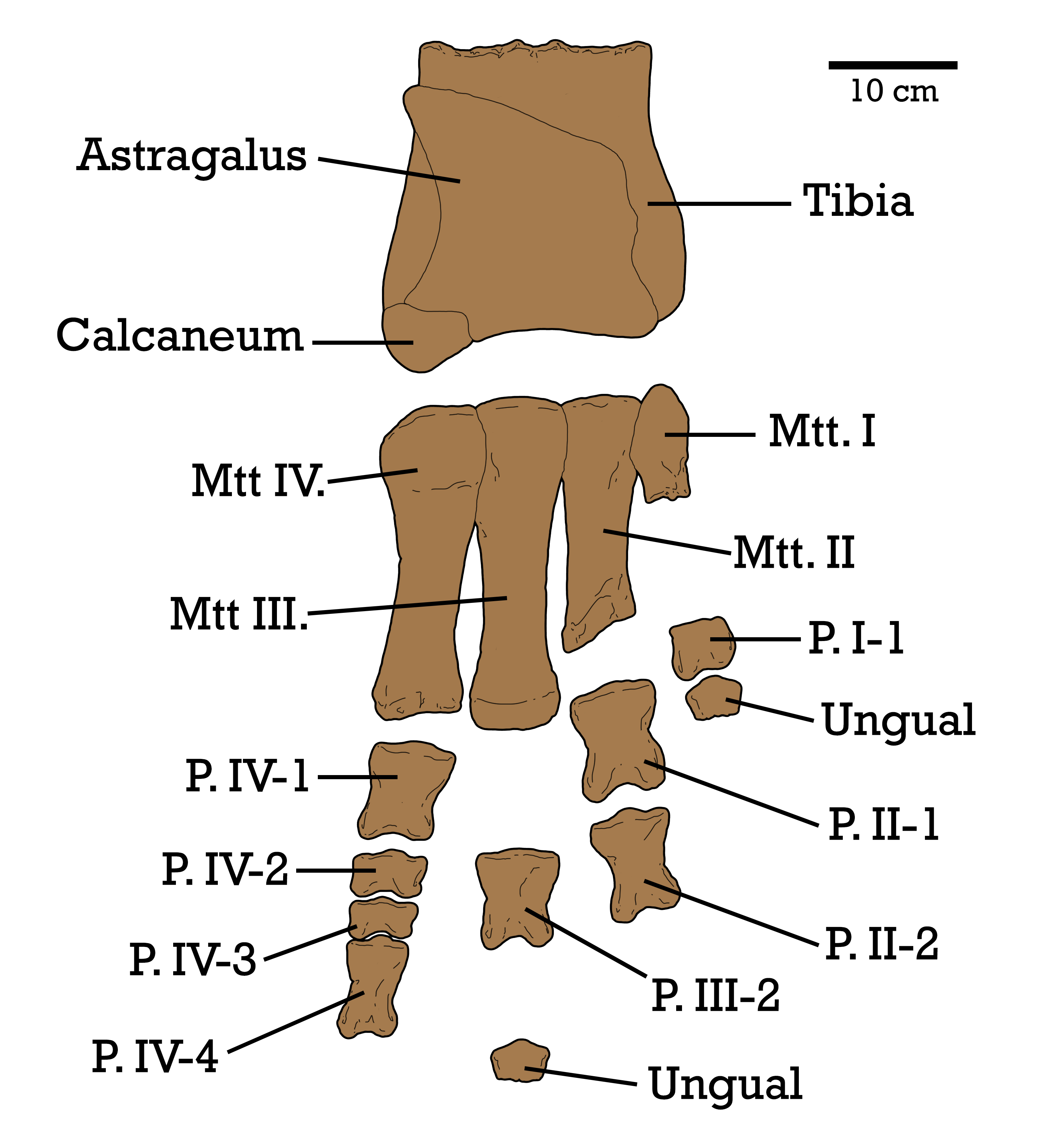
Labelled diagram of the referred pes specimen MPC-D 100/45

Therizinosaurus had a rather stocky and robust tibia that was widest at its distal (lower) end. The pes (foot) was robust and short, almost like that of sauropodomorphs, and consisted of five metatarsals. The first four were functional and terminated in weight-bearing digits, hence having a tetradactyl (four-toed) condition. The last or fifth metatarsal was highly reduced bone located at the lateral side of the metatarsus and had no functional significance. Unlike most other theropods groups, the first pedal digit was—though shorter than the others—functional and weight-bearing. The second and third were equally long while the fourth was smaller and somewhat thinner. The pedal unguals were laterally compressed and sharp. The morphology of the feet of Therizinosaurus and other therizinosaurids was unique among theropods: other theropods were tridactyl (three-toed), and though most retained the first toe, it was reduced to a dewclaw and held off the ground.

== Classification ==
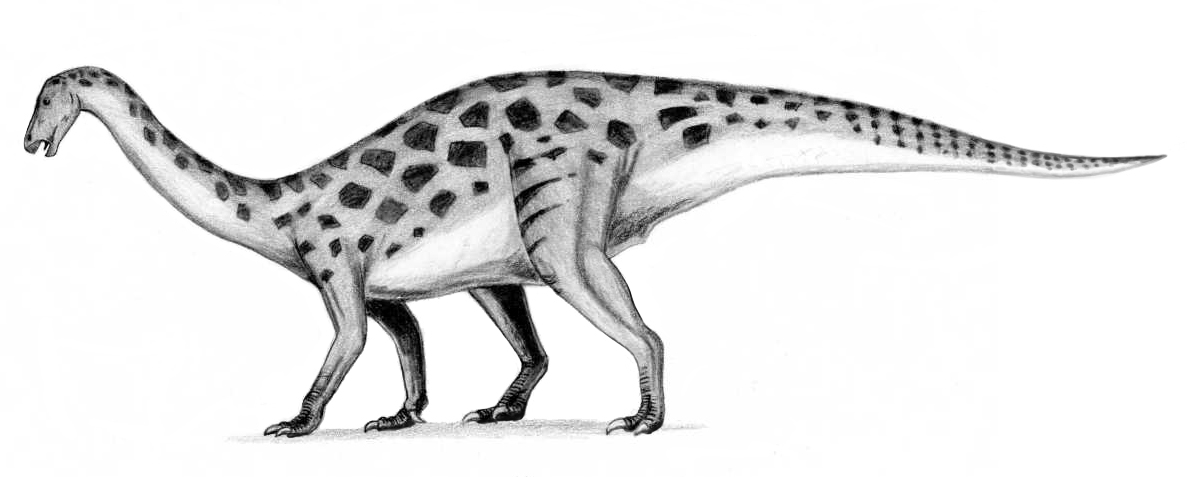
Outdated quadrupedal, sauropodomorph-like restoration of the related Erlikosaurus

Evgeny Maleev originally classified Therizinosaurus as a giant marine turtle. The genus was assigned to a family of its own, Therizinosauridae, given how much it differed from other taxa known at the time. Among the first to suggest a theropod affinity for Therizinosaurus was Anatoly Rozhdestvensky, in 1970, who also suggested that the supposed ribs of the holotype were likely from a different dinosaur, possibly a sauropodomorph. In 1976, Rinchen Barsbold seconded the notion that Therizinosaurus was a theropod because MPC-D 100/15 had distinct theropod traits, and suggested that Therizinosauridae and Deinocheiridae were synonyms. With the discovery and description of Segnosaurus, in 1979 Perle named a new family of dinosaurs, Segnosauridae. He tentatively placed the family within Theropoda given the similarities of the mandible and dentition to other members. A year later, the new genus Erlikosaurus was named by Barsbold and Perle in 1980. They named a new infraorder called the Segnosauria, composed of Erlikosaurus and Segnosaurus. They also noted that while aberrant and having ornithischian-like pelves, segnosaurs featured similar traits to other theropods. With the discovery of the referred hindlimb to Therizinosaurus in 1982 by Perle, he concluded that Segnosaurus was very similar to the latter based on the morphology and they possibly belonged to a single group. In 1983, Barsbold named a new genus of segnosaur, Enigmosaurus. He analyzed the pelvis of the new genus and pointed out that segnosaurids were so different from other theropods that they could be outside the group or represent a different lineage of theropod dinosaurs. Later on the same year, he intensified the exclusion of segnosaurs from being theropods by noting that their pelves resembled those of sauropod dinosaurs.

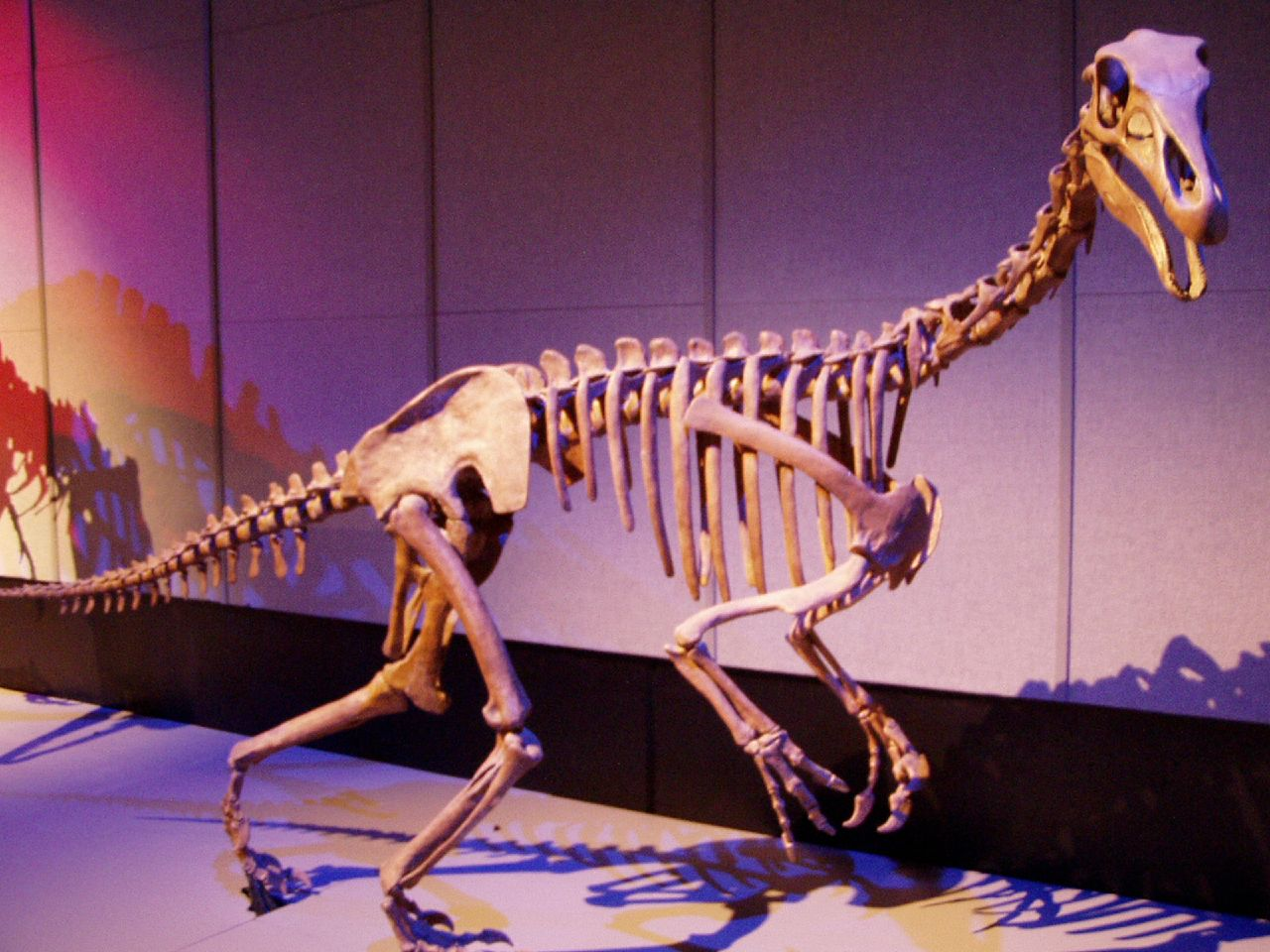
Mounted skeleton of Alxasaurus at the Royal Tyrrell Museum. Alxasaurus helped to resolve important aspects about the affinities of the long-enigmatic therizinosaurs

Consequently, the assignment of segnosaurs started to shift towards sauropodomorphs. In 1984, Gregory S. Paul claimed that segnosaurs, rather than being theropods, were instead morphological and evolutionary intermediates between sauropodomorphs and ornithischians, late survivors of an early herbivorous dinosaur radiation which had persisted into the Cretaceous. He maintained his position in 1988 by placing the Segnosauria into the newly-erected and now-obsolete Phytodinosauria, and was among the first to suggest a segnosaur assignment for the enigmatic Therizinosaurus. Other prominent paleontologists like Jacques Gauthier and Paul Sereno supported this vision. In 1990, Rinchen Barsbold and Teresa Maryańska agreed in that the hindlimb material from Hermiin Tsav referred to Therizinosaurus in 1982 was segnosaurian since it matched several traits, but considered it unlikely to belong to the genus and species as there was no overlapping material. Barsbold and Maryańska also disagreed with previous researchers who classified Deinocheirus as a segnosaur. In the same year, David B. Norman, wrote that Therizinosaurus was likely a theropod of uncertain classification.

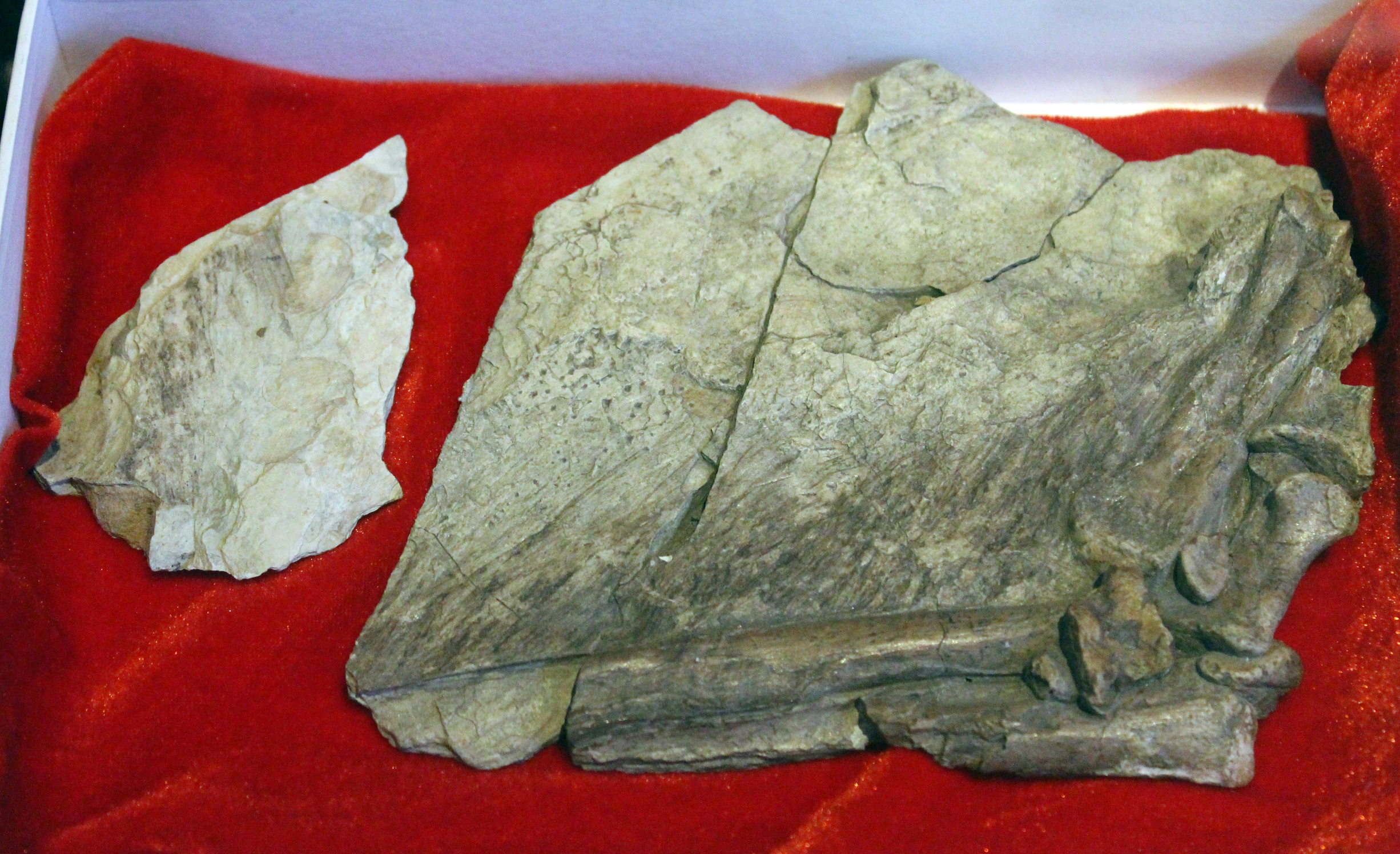
Feather impressions from the holotype of Beipiaosaurus

With the unexpected discovery of Alxasaurus in 1988, and its description in 1993, the widely accepted sauropodomorph affinities of segnosaurs were questioned by paleontologists Dale Russell and Dong Zhiming. This new genus was far more complete than any other segnosaur and multiple anatomical features indicated that it was related to Therizinosaurus. Its description allowed for the recognition of Segnosauridae and Therizinosauridae as a single clade; as the second name predates the first, it holds taxonomic priority. Due to some primitive characters present in Alxasaurus, they coined a new taxonomic rank, the superfamily Therizinosauroidea, containing it and Therizinosauridae. All of the new information provided data on the affinities of the new-named therizinosauroids. Russell and Dong concluded that they were theropods with unusual features. In 1994, Clark and colleagues redescribed the very complete skull of Erlikosaurus and even more theropod traits were found this time. They also validated the synonymy of the Segnosauridae with Therizinosauridae and considered therizinosauroids as maniraptoran dinosaurs. In 1997, Rusell coined the infraorder Therizinosauria in order to contain all segnosaurs. This new infraorder was composed of Therizinosauroidea and the smaller, more derived clade Therizinosauridae. Consequently, Segnosauria became a synonym of Therizinosauria. A small, feathered therizinosauroid from China, Beipiaosaurus, was described in 1999 by Xu Xing and colleagues. It confirmed the placement of therizinosaurs, among theropods and also their taxonomic place on the Coelurosauria. The discovery also indicated that feathers were highly distributed among theropod dinosaurs.

In 2010, Lindsay Zanno revised the taxonomy of therizinosaurs in extensive detail. She found that many parts on therizinosaur holotype and referred specimens were lost or damaged, and sparse specimens with no overlapping elements were disadvantages when concluding the relationships of the members. Zanno accepted the referral of the specimen IGM 100/45 to Therizinosaurus since it matches multiple therizinosaurid traits, but decided not to include the specimen in her taxonomic analysis due to the lack of comparative forelimb remains. She also excluded the supposed ribs that were present on the holotype since they likely came from a different animal and not Therizinosaurus. In 2019, Hartman and colleagues also performed a large phylogenetic analysis of Therizinosauria based on the characters provided by Zanno in her revision. They found similar results to Zanno regarding the family Therizinosauridae but this time with the inclusion of more taxa and specimens. The cladogram below shows the placement of Therizinosaurus within Therizinosauria according to Hartman and colleagues in 2019:

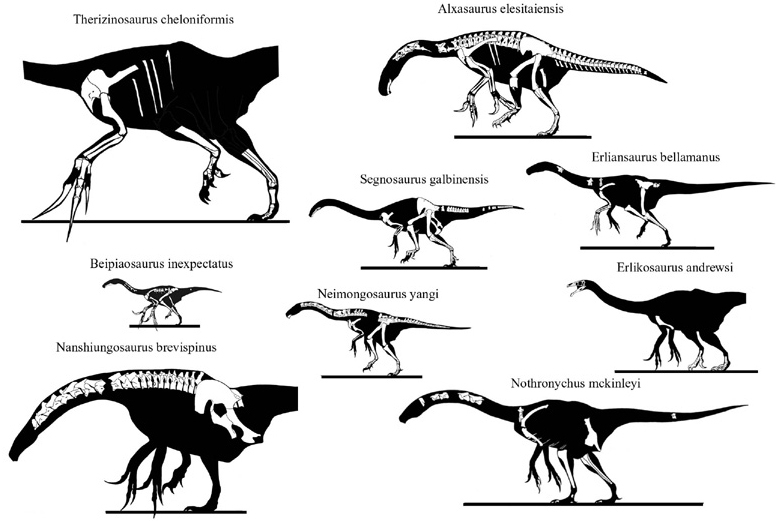
Skeletal reconstructions of various therizinosaurian genera (not to scale); Therizinosaurus in top left

- Therizinosauridae
  - unnamed
    - Suzhousaurus
    - unnamed
      - Neimongosaurus
      - unnamed
        - Therizinosaurus
        - Erliansaurus
  - unnamed
    - Nanchao embryos
    - unnamed
      - Nanshiungosaurus
      - unnamed
        - unnamed
          - Segnosaurus
          - AMNH 6368
        - - - Erlikosaurus
            - unnamed
              Nothronychus mckinleyi
            - unnamed
              Nothronychus graffami

== Paleobiology ==
=== Feeding ===
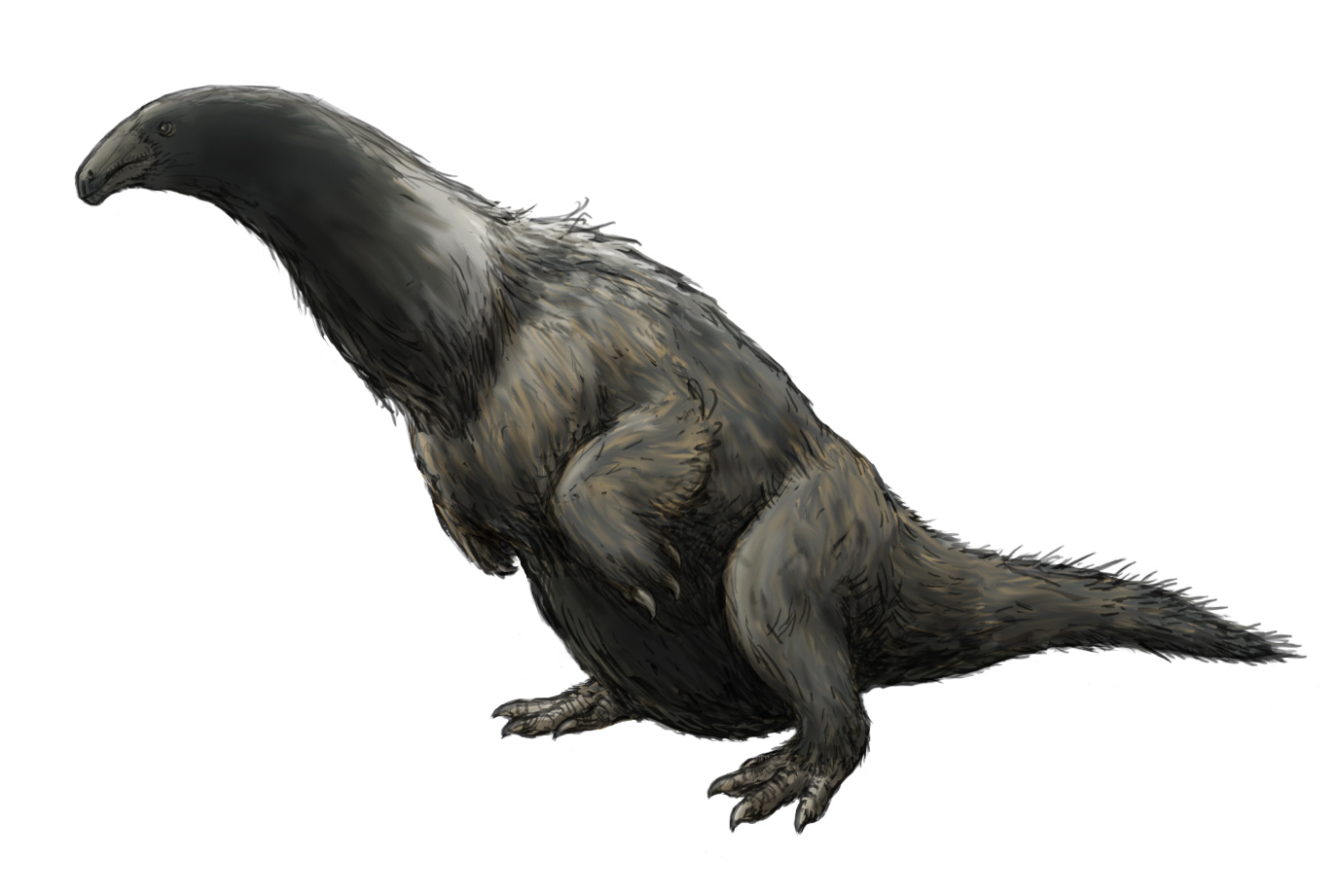
Life restoration of Erliansaurus in a sitting stance. Therizinosaurus may have sat on its pelvis during feeding

In 1993 Dale A. Russell and Donald E. Russell analyzed Therizinosaurus and Chalicotherium, and noted similarities in their respective body plan, even though they form part of different groups. Both genera had large, well-developed, and relatively strong arms; the pelvic girdle was robust and suited for a sitting behavior; and the hindlimb (particularly the foot) structure was robust and shortened. They considered these adaptations to represent an example of convergent evolution—a condition where organisms evolve similar traits without necessarily being related—between extinct mammal and dinosaur genera. Moreover, the body plan is somewhat exhibited by the modern-day gorillas. Because the animals with this type of body plan are known to represent herbivores, the authors suggested this lifestyle for Therizinosaurus. Russell and Russell reconstructed the feeding behavior of Therizinosaurus as being able to sit while consuming foliage from large shrubs and trees. The plant material would have been harvested with its hands and this action was likely favored by its elongated neck which prevented the use of large amounts of force and effort. As its arms were long enough to have touched the ground during certain stances, they could have helped the dinosaur to rise from a prone position. If browsing in a bipedal stance, Therizinosaurus may have been able to reach even higher vegetation supported by its short and robust feet. Whereas Chalicotherium was more suited to hook branches, Therizinosaurus was better at pushing large clumps of foliage because of its long claws. It is also possible that Therizinosaurus was less capable of great precision in its movements than was Chalicotherium, due to the latter having more developed brain, dental and muscular capacities.

Anthony R. Fiorillo and colleagues in 2018 suggested that Therizinosaurus had a reduced bite force that may have been useful for cropping vegetation or foraging, based on relative therizinosaurids such as Erlikosaurus and Segnosaurus. As the bite force started to decrease from primitive to derived therizinosaurians, Therizinosaurus, being a derived member, would have been subject to the evolutionary relationship.

=== Arms and claws function ===
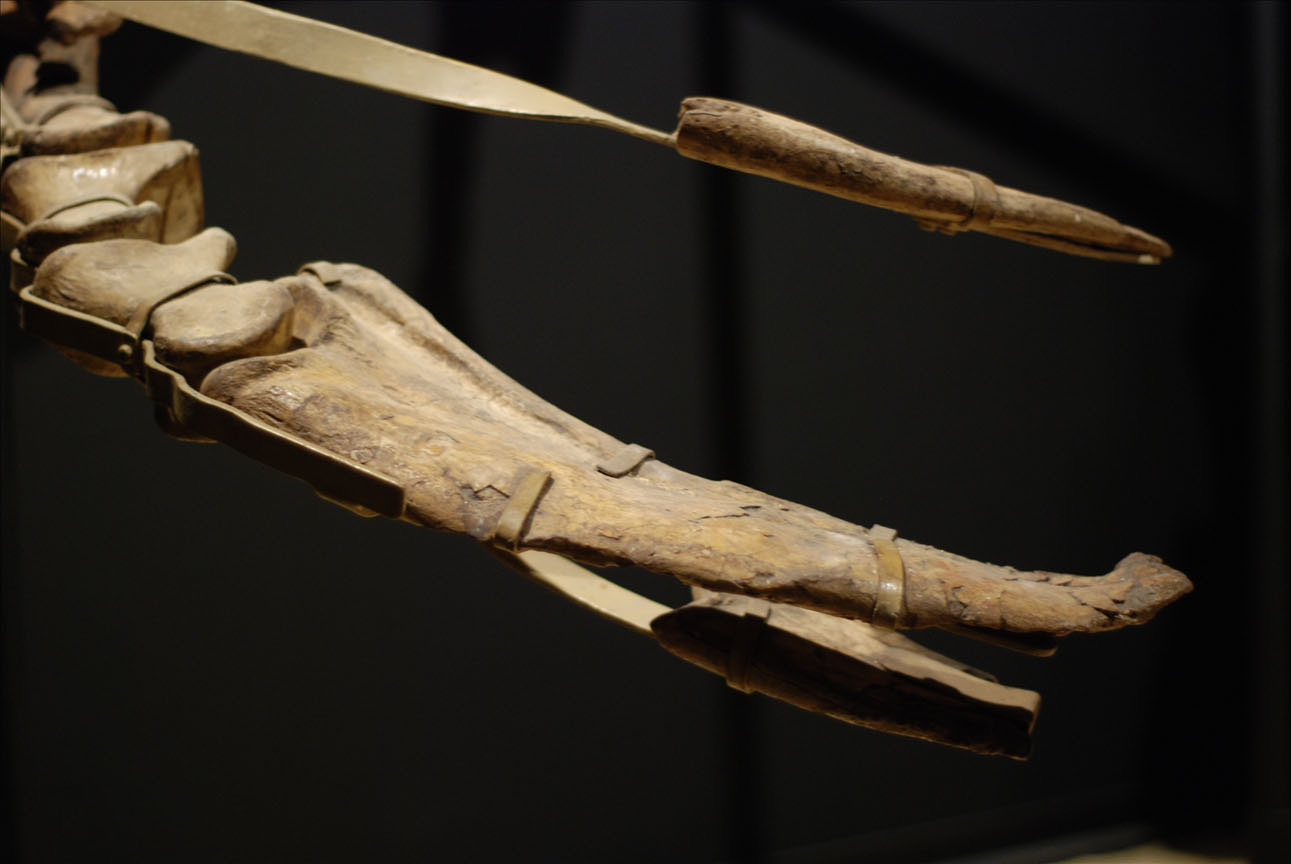
Lateral view of the unguals in specimens MPC-D 100/15, 100/16, and 100/17. Therizinosaurus may have used its claws for grasping foliage

When the genus was first described by Maleev in 1954, he considered that the unusually large claws were used to harvest seaweed. This was however, based on the assumption of a giant marine turtle. In 1970, Rozhdestvensky re-examined the claws and suggested a possible function specialized in opening termite mounds or a frugivore diet. Barsbold in 1976 suggested that the unusual claws of Therizinosaurus may have been employed to impale or dig up loose terrain, however, he pointed out their notorious fragility upon impact. In 1995, Lev A. Nessov suggested the elongated claws were used for defense against predators and juveniles could have used their claws for arboreal locomotion, in a similar way to the modern-day sloths or hoatzin chicks.

In 2014, Lautenschlager tested the function of various therizinosaur hand claws—including Therizinosaurus—through digital simulations. Three different functional scenarios were simulated for each claw morphology with a force of 400 N applied in each scenario: scratch/digging; hook-and-pull; and piercing. Though the stocky claws of Alxasaurus resulted in low-stress magnitudes, the stress was greater with the curvature and elongation of the claws in Falcarius, Nothronychus and Therizinosaurus. Some of the highest stress, deformation, and strain magnitudes were obtained in the scratch/digging scenario; the hook-and-pull scenario, in contrast, resulted in lower magnitudes, and lesser ones were found in the piercing scenario. Particularly, the overall stress was most pronounced in the unusual claws of Therizinosaurus, which may represent an exceptional case of elongation specialization. Lautenschlager noted the more strongly curved and elongate claws of some therizinosaurian taxa were poorly functional in a scratch/digging fashion, indicating this as the most unlikely function. Though fossorial (digging) behavior has been reported in several dinosaur species, the large body size largely rules out the possibility of burrow digging in therizinosaurs. Nevertheless, an overall digging action would have been done with the foot claws because, since as in other maniraptorans, feathers on the arms would have interfered with this function. Instead of being used for fossorial behavior, it is more likely that Therizinosaurus make use of its hands in a hook-and-pull fashion to pull or grasp vegetation within reach. This herbivorous behavior would make therizinosaurs mostly similar to the extant anteaters and the extinct ground sloths. Lautenschlager could neither confirm nor disregard that the hand claws could have been used for defense, intraspecific competition, stabilization by grasping tree trunks during high browsing, sexual dimorphism, or gripping mates during mating given the lack of more specimens. He clarified that there is no evidence that the long claws of Therizinosaurus would have been used in active defense or attack; however, it is possible that these appendages could have had some role when facing a threat, such as intimidation.

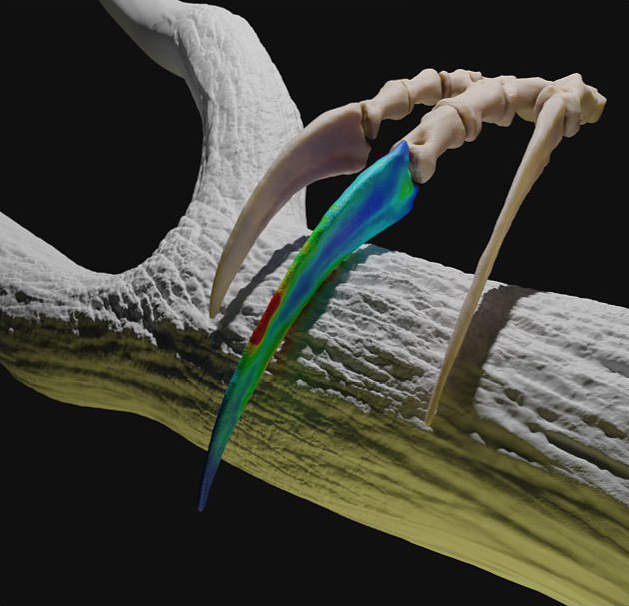
Manus of Therizinosaurus tested in a hook and pull scenario

Scott A. Lee and Zachary Richards in 2018 based on bending resistance measurements of several dinosaur humeri, found the humeri of carnosaur, therizinosaur, and tyrannosaur dinosaurs to be relatively resilient to stress. This increased ability to withstand stress supports the idea that Therizinosaurus and other therizinosaurians used their arms in a robust fashion that generated significant forces. They also suggested that the prominent claws of some members could have been used as a defense against predators and other various functions. Unlike the generally light and agile ornithomimosaurs who avoided predation with speed, Therizinosaurus and relatives relied on arms and claws to face threats (and were generally slow-runners to begin with).

A 2023 study by Qin, Rayfield, Benton, et al., regarding the claw function in therizinosaurids and alvarezsaurids, which represent the extremes of theropod claw morphology, suggest that there was no mechanical function identifiable for Therizinosaurus, suggesting the claws on its forelimbs were merely decorative rather than functional and a result of peramorphic growth resulting from increased body size.

== Paleoenvironment ==
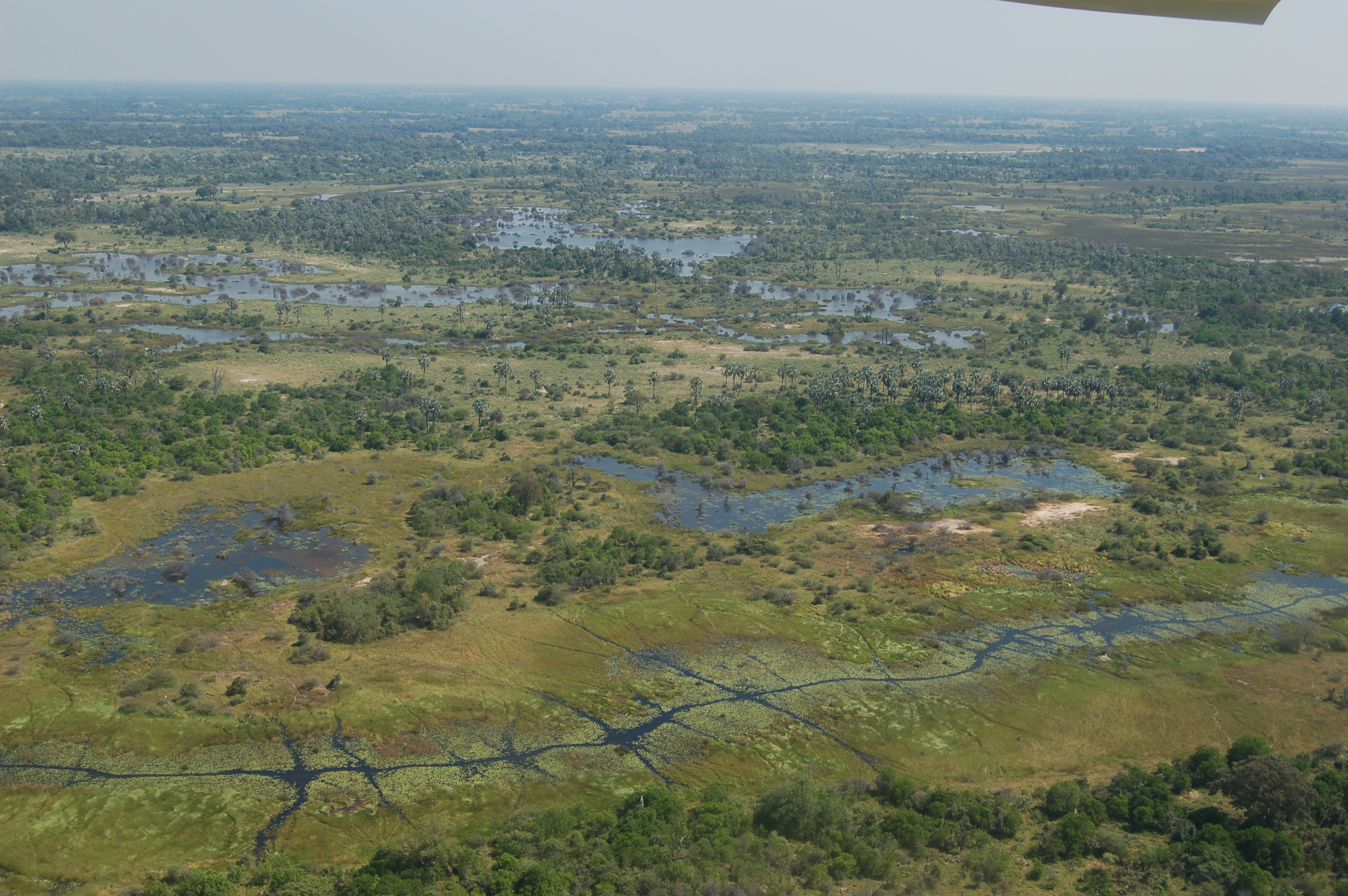
The Nemegt Formation may have had similar environments to those of the swampy Okavango Delta

The remains of Therizinosaurus have been found in the well-known Nemegt Formation of the Gobi Desert. Although this formation has never been dated radiometrically because of the discontinuity of exposures and absence of datable volcanic rock facies, the vertebrate fossil assemblage suggests a Maastrichtian stage (and possibly Late Campanian). The Nemegt Formation is separated into three informal members. The lower member is mainly composed by fluvial sediments, while middle and upper members consist of alluvial plain, paludal, lacustrine, and fluvial sedimentation. Therizinosaurus is known from the Altan Uul, Hermiin Tsav, and Nemegt localities, belonging to the lower and middle members of the formation.

The environments that Therizinosaurus inhabited have been determined by the sedimentation across the formation, the δ13C level preserved on the tooth enamel of many herbivorous dinosaurs and the numerous petrified wood across the formation. They consisted of large meandering and braided rivers with extensive woodlands composed of large, enclosed, canopy-like forests of Araucarias that supported diverse herbivorous dinosaurs like Therizinosaurus. The climate of the formation was relatively temperate (mean annual temperatures between 7.6 and 8.7 °C), characterized by monsoons with cold, dry winters and hot, rainy summers with the addition of mean annual precipitations between 775 mmm and 835 mmm, a precipitation that was subject to prominent seasonal fluctuations. The wet environments of the Nemegt Formation may have acted as an oasis-like area that attracted oviraptorids from arid neighbour localities such as the Barun Goyot Formation, as evidenced on the presence of Nemegtomaia in both regions. It has been previously suggested that the Nemegt Formation may have been similar to the modern-day Okavango Delta, which is also composed of mesic (well-watered) surroundings.

The area would have been semi-arid during certain times of the year. While the environment was likely dominated by Araucarian conifer forests, it also contained ginkgos, reed grasses, fagalean trees, cycad-like plants, sycamores (plane trees), bald cypresses, katsura relatives, pondweeds, tupelos, duckweeds, lotuses, and sedges.

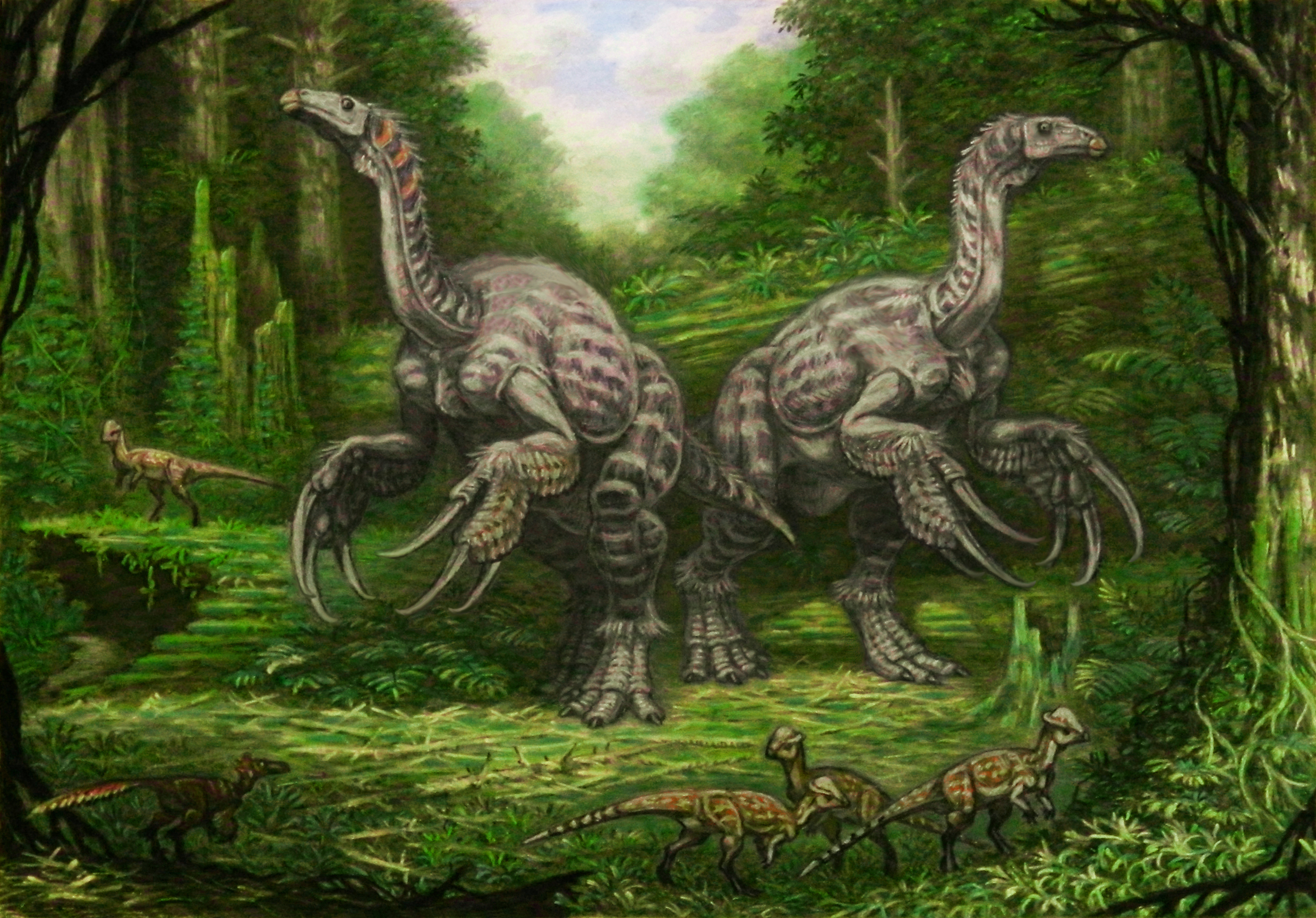
Life restoration of a Therizinosaurus pair along with a small group of Prenocephale, and Adasaurus

The paleofauna of the Nemegt Formation was diverse and rich, composed of other dinosaurs such as the alvarezsaurs Mononykus and Nemegtonykus; deinonychosaurs Adasaurus, and Zanabazar; ornithomimosaurs Anserimimus and Gallimimus; oviraptorosaurs Avimimus, Conchoraptor, Rinchenia, and Elmisaurus; tyrannosaurids Alectrosaurus, Alioramus, and possibly Bagaraatan; ankylosaurids Saichania and Tarchia; and pachycephalosaurids Homalocephale and Prenocephale. The Nemegt megafauna included the ornithomimosaur Deinocheirus; hadrosaurids Barsboldia and Saurolophus; titanosaurs Nemegtosaurus and Opisthocoelicaudia; and the apex predator Tarbosaurus. Additional paleofauna includes birds like Judinornis or Teviornis; abundant freshwater ostracods at numerous localities; fish; terrestrial and aquatic turtles such as Mongolochelys and Nemegtemys; and the crocodylomorph Paralligator.

As the sediments in which Therizinosaurus remains have been found are fluvial-based, it is suggested that it may have preferred to forage on riparian areas. Due to its prominent height and high-browsing lifestyle, Therizinosaurus was one of the tallest dinosaurs in the Nemegt Formation paleofauna. It probably had no significant competition with other herbivores over the foliage; however, a niche partitioning with the titanosaurs—also long-necked dinosaurs—of the formation could have occurred. If Therizinosaurus was a grazer, on the other hand, it would have competed with contemporary grazers such as Saurolophus. Although small predators like dromaeosaurids and troodontids did not represent a threat to Therizinosaurus, the only other predator rivaling in size was Tarbosaurus. Because of the greater height of Therizinosaurus, a large Tarbosaurus may have been not able to bite any higher than the thighs or belly of an adult standing Therizinosaurus. The elongated claws may have been useful for self-defense or to intimidate the predator during this situation. It is also possible that Therizinosaurus competed for other various resources with Deinocheirus, Saurolophus, Nemegtosaurus and Opisthocoelicaudia.

== See also ==
- Timeline of therizinosaur research
