= Virtual community (disambiguation) =

A virtual community is an online social network.

It may also refer to:

- Online community, whose members interact with each other primarily via the Internet
- Virtual community of practice, a community of practice that is maintained online
- The Virtual Community, a 1993 book by Howard Rheingold
- Virtual business, which employs electronic means to transact business
- Virtual reality, a simulated experience
- Virtual scientific community, a group of scientists who share resources over the internet
- Virtual team, individuals who work together from different geographic locations
- Virtual world, a computer-simulated environment

== See also ==
- List of virtual communities
  - List of virtual communities with more than 1 million users
- IBM Virtual Universe Community
- Category:Virtual communities
- Virtual (disambiguation)
- Community (disambiguation)
