= CIML (disambiguation) =

CIML is the initialism for the Centre d'immunologie de Marseille-Luminy.

CIML can also refer to:

- Central Iowa Metro League, a high school athletic conference in Iowa
- CIML community portal, virtual scientific community for computational intelligence and machine learning
