= Virtual girl (disambiguation) =

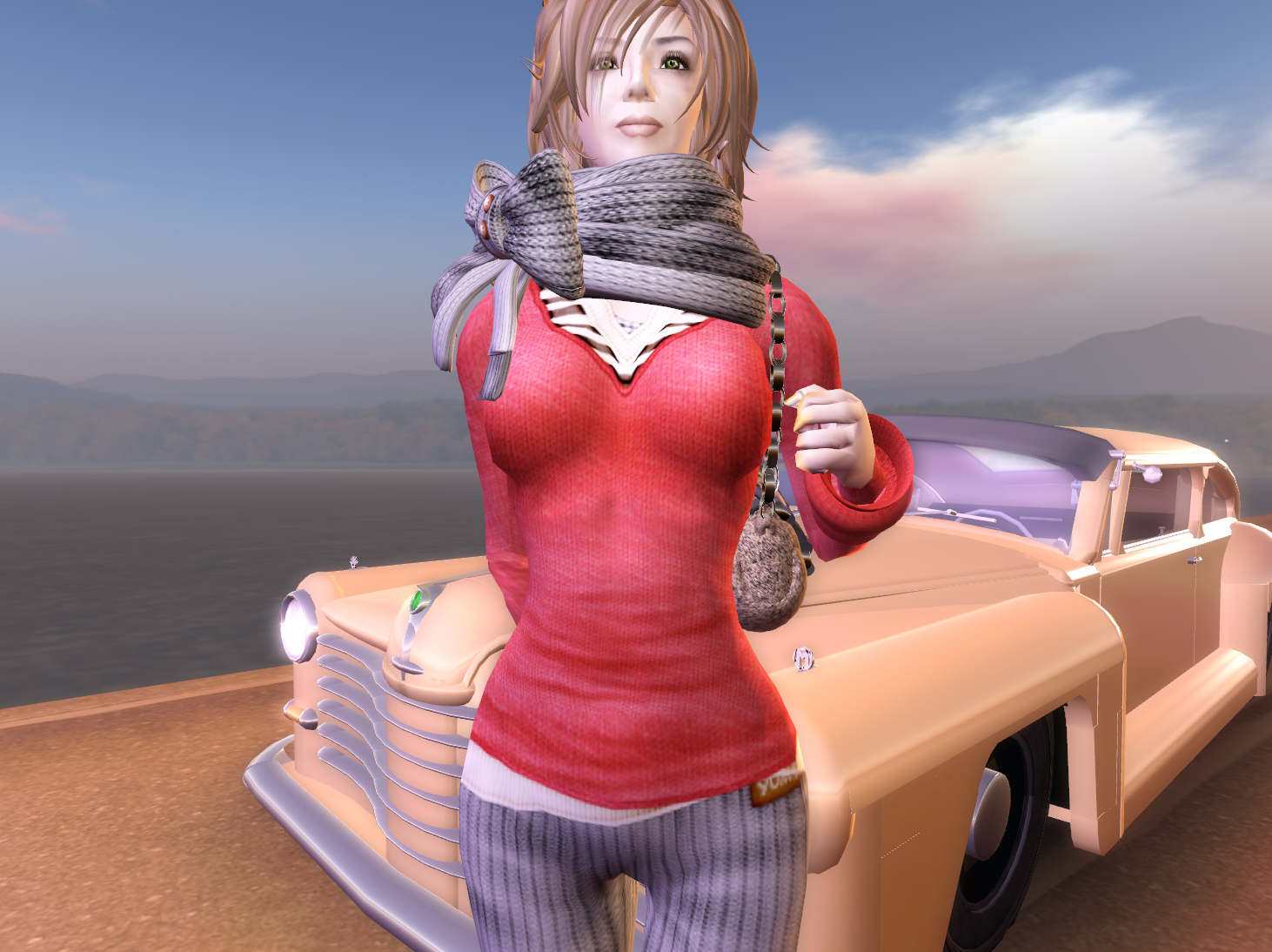
A virtual girl art generated by a computer (software)

A virtual girl is the creation or re-creation of a human girl in image and voice using computer-generated imagery and sound.

Virtual girl may also refer to:

- Virtual Girl, a 1993 science fiction novel
- Virtual Woman, a software program
