= Virtual human (disambiguation) =

A virtual human is a real or fictional human being rendered by software.

Virtual human may also refer to:

- Visible Human Project, an effort to create a detailed data set of cross-sectional photographs of the human body
- Virtual Physiological Human, a methodological and technological framework
- Virtual body, a state of being when inhabiting virtual reality or a virtual environment
- Virtual actor, a creation or re-creation of a human being in image and voice using computer-generated imagery and sound

== See also ==
- Virtual agent (disambiguation)
- Virtual character (disambiguation)
- Avatar (computing), a graphical representation of a user or the user's character or persona
- Embodied agent, an intelligent agent that interacts with the environment through a physical body within that environment
- Virtual Woman, a software program that has elements of a chatbot, virtual reality, artificial intelligence, a video game, and a virtual human
