= Virtual agent =

Virtual agent may refer to:

== Computing and technology ==
- A virtual agent, a specialized software agent that interacts with humans in a human-agent team
- Virtual assistant
- Intelligent agent, in artificial intelligence
- Dialogue system
- Pedagogical agent
- Chatbot, a software robot

== Other uses ==
- Virtual assistant (occupation), a person offering remote service

== See also ==
- Virtual actor
- Virtual character (disambiguation)
- Virtual friend (disambiguation)
- Virtual human (disambiguation)
