= (character) =

The remaining text, "(character)" may refer to:

- (character): Space (punctuation)
- _ (character): Underscore
- : (character): Colon (punctuation)

== See also ==
- Character (disambiguation)
- Character (symbol)
