= Virtual =

Virtual may refer to:

- Virtual image, an apparent image of an object (as opposed to a real object), in the study of optics
- Virtual (horse), a thoroughbred racehorse
- Virtual channel, a channel designation which differs from that of the actual radio channel (or range of frequencies) on which the signal travels
- Virtual function, a programming function or method whose behaviour can be overridden within an inheriting class by a function with the same signature
- Virtual machine, the virtualization of a computer system
- Virtual meeting, or web conferencing
- Virtual memory, a memory management technique that abstracts the memory address space in a computer
- Virtual particle, a type of short-lived particle of indeterminate mass
- Virtual reality (virtuality), computer programs with an interface that gives the user the impression that they are physically inside a simulated space
- Virtual world, a computer-based simulated environment populated by many users who can create a personal avatar, and simultaneously and independently explore the world, participate in its activities and communicate with others
- Virtual, a 2001 album by Romanian band Animal X
- Virtual (role-playing game), published 2003
- Virtual, a former Blizzard Entertainment online streamer known for interviewing Ng Wai Chung during the Blitzchung Controversy
- Exit pupil, a virtual aperture in an optical system

== See also ==
- Virtual community (disambiguation)
- List of things described as virtual
- Virtuality (disambiguation)
- Virtualization, a computing technique to create representations of computer resources
- Virtua (disambiguation)
- Wirtual
