= Community (disambiguation) =

A community is a social unit that shares common values, or a group of interacting living organisms sharing an environment.

Community or Communities may also refer to:

== Places ==
- Community (administrative division), a level of government structure found in many countries
  - Community (Armenia)
  - Community (China)
  - Community (Greece)
  - Community (Wales)

== Art, entertainment, and media ==
- Communities (magazine)
- "Community" (Fear Itself), 2008 episode
- Community (TV series), an American television sitcom
- Community: A NewOrderOnline Tribute, an album
- "Community" a song by JID and Clipse from God Does Like Ugly

== Other uses ==
- Community (ecology), a collection of populations of different species
  - Plant community
- Community (trade union)
- Community structure, a concept in graph theory
- European Community, the first of the former pillars of the European Union
- Intentional community

== See also ==
- List of community topics
- Sense of community
- Virtual community (disambiguation)
