= Virtual character =

Virtual character may refer to:

- Avatar (computing)
- Embodied agent
- Game character (disambiguation)
- Representation theory of finite groups § Representation ring
- Virtual actor
- Virtual agent (disambiguation)
- Virtual assistant
- Virtual band member
- Virtual friend (disambiguation)
- Virtual human
- Virtual influencer
- Virtual newscaster
- Virtual politician
- Virtual YouTuber

== See also ==
- Character (disambiguation)
- Virtual (disambiguation)
- Virtual human (disambiguation)
