= The Princeton Field Guide to Dinosaurs =

- First edition cover
- Author: Gregory S. Paul
- Language: English
- Genre: Reference encyclopedia
- Publisher: Princeton University Press
- Publication date: 2010 (1st edition); 2016 (2nd edition); 2024 (3rd edition)
- Publication place: United States
- Pages: 320 (1st edition); 360 (2nd edition); 384 (3rd edition)
- ISBN: 978-0-691-13720-9

The Princeton Field Guide to Dinosaurs is a reference work on dinosaurs written by the paleontologist and paleoartist Gregory S. Paul. It was first published by Princeton University Press in 2010. In the United Kingdom it was published by A & C Black under the title Dinosaurs: A Field Guide. An updated second edition was released in 2016. A third edition was released in 2024.

The book was well-received upon its release but garnered a mixed reception among paleontologists, who generally praised the large number of skeletal and life reconstructions throughout the book but questioned Paul's at times unorthodox approach to dinosaur taxonomy.

== Format ==
The Princeton Field Guide to Dinosaurs was the first in the line of field guides published by Princeton University Press to be on an extinct (and thus not actually observable in the field) group of organisms. The book is a reference work on dinosaurs envisioned to be "in the style of a field guide". The book contains information on a wide assortment of dinosaur species and genera, accompanied with a large number life restorations and skeletal reconstructions of different species; envisioned by Paul as encompassing almost all species for which sufficient fossil material is available to allow such reconstructions.

The first edition of The Princeton Field Guide to Dinosaurs included entries on over 700 dinosaur species and over 600 illustrations, out of which around 400 were skeletal reconstructions. The entry of each dinosaur species includes information on its size, age, distribution and anatomical characteristics. The second edition features entries on around 100 new species and around 200 new or updated illustrations.

The book also contains a long introductory section (65 pages in the first edition and 68 pages in the second) exploring the evolution, biology, anatomy, and behavior of dinosaurs, as well as the climate and paleogeography of the Mesozoic era.

== Reception ==
The Princeton Field Guide to Dinosaurs garnered positive reviews upon its release. Reviews published by Wired and the National Audubon Society, for instance, praised the book's extensive coverage of dinosaurs and its many illustrations, though noted that it may be written in a too technical manner to appeal to children and "casual dinosaur fans".

=== Scientific response ===
The illustrations of The Princeton Field Guide to Dinosaurs were generally applauded by paleontologists. The British paleontologist Darren Naish praised the artwork, particularly that the book included depictions of several dinosaurs only rarely (and in some cases never) illustrated prior, though he also found the illustrations to be "shrink-wrapped" (reconstructed with too little soft tissue). Naish also thought that the book's value could have been improved with specimen numbers and scale bars next to the reconstructions. The American paleontologist Stephen L. Brusatte praised the book as an "artistic treasure", noting that "no other dinosaur book features such an extensive catalogue of artistic reconstructions" and applauding it for including many newly described species for the first time in a popular science book. Jaime Headden and Mickey Mortimer also praised the artworks in the book, but noted that many skeletal reconstructions didn't make clear what parts had been found and what were reconstructed.

Several paleontologists, including Naish, Brusatte, Headden, Mortimer, Riley Black, Andrea Cau and Christopher R. Noto, criticized Paul's approach to dinosaur taxonomy. All seven noted that Paul in several cases chose to synonymize different genera that most paleontologists still regard as distinct; the book for instance treats the ceratopsids Centrosaurus, Styracosaurus, Einiosaurus, Achelousaurus and Pachyrhinosaurus as all belonging to the same genus (Centrosaurus). Both Naish and Brusatte, as well as Cau, Headden and Mortimer particularly criticized Paul's lack of explanations and justifications for his reclassifications in the text. Some other taxonomic choices, such as the assignment of some genera to specific groups and the use of original clades (such as "minmids" and "paxceratopsians") also received some criticism.

Brusatte further criticized Paul's lack of references. Although admitting that including references would not be standard for a field guide, he found the book's lack of references to make it "useless as a piece of scientific literature". Brusatte also questioned some statements in the book as verging too far into speculation, such as Paul's writings on dinosaur behavior.

== See also ==
- A Field Guide to Dinosaurs
