= Game character =

A game character is a character in a game.

Game character may also refer to:

- Player character (PC), a character in a game that is controlled by a player
  - Alternate character, a character in addition to one's main player character
- Non-player character (NPC), a character in a game that is controlled by the computer, not by players
  - Boss (video games), a significantly powerful non-player character created as a major opponent for players to fight
  - Mob (video games), short for "mobile object", a computer-controlled "grunt" character that players can fight or interact

== See also ==
- Virtual character (disambiguation)
