= Virtua =

Virtua may refer to:

- Virtua Health, an American healthcare system

== Video games ==
- Virtua Cop
- Virtua Fighter
- Virtua Racing
- Virtua Striker
- Virtua Tennis
