= Character (income tax) =

Character is the type of income to calculate the taxpayer's tax liability. In the United States, the Supreme Court decided ( Commissioner v. Glenshaw Glass Co.) that income is an accession to wealth, however capital gain is of different character from ordinary income. Ordinary income includes earned wage income and interest income from lending.

== Capital Income ==
=== U.S. ===
The IRS characterizes income or loss as a capital gain or loss depending on how the taxpayer generates the gain or loss. When the taxpayer invests in real estate or security and then later sells that piece of real estate or security, the IRS characterizes the amount that exceeds the purchase price as capital income while the amount that falls short of the purchase price is capital loss. The IRS refers to the purchase price as the tax basis.

When the IRS characterizes income as capital gain, it enjoys a lower tax rate than ordinary income.

== Ordinary Income ==
=== U.S. ===
The IRS characterizes ordinary income as income generated from earned wage income or interest income earned from lending.

The IRS taxes ordinary income according to a progressive rate determined by the amount of income. It is a progressive income tax.

== See also ==
- Internal Revenue Service Official website
- Taxable income
