= Virtual artifact =

Immaterial object that exists in the human mind or in a digital environment

A virtual artifact (VA) is an immaterial object that exists in the human mind or in a digital environment, for example the Internet, intranet, virtual reality, cyberspace, etc.

== Background ==
The term "virtual artifact" has been used in a variety of ways in scientific and public discourse. Previously it has referred to objects of different nature (e.g. images, user interfaces, models, prototypes, computer animation, or virtual books) that exist in digital environments. The concept behind the term is rapidly developing and expanding as new phenomena emerge in the virtual domain.

=== History of the phenomenon ===
Imaginary worlds, characters, items, etc. have been described in stories and tales since the dawn of humanity. In the philosophic discourse, utopias have existed where extensive systems and their components have been depicted in detail. Imaginary artifacts have been described and created in terms of language and visual presentation. The development of the visual presentation techniques (e.g. linear perspective, cinematography) enabled more sophisticated methods to describe these artifacts, events and entities in painting, photography and film. Moreover, virtual artifacts were (and still are) commonly found in environments that require a strong imaginary aspect in order to be experienced, such as radio shows, novels, tabletop role-playing games, etc.

The development of computing enabled the creation of interactive virtual environments that were based on digital technologies and new methods of presentation. In digital environments, virtual artifacts became independent entities that could exist and interact outside the human mind. Even previously unknown, complex forms and imaginary artifacts (e.g. fractals) could be created and represented in these environments.

== In digital environments ==
Christopher Polhem mechanical wooden model from the early 1700s. This virtual artifact can be found in real life at the Swedish National Museum of Science and Technology in Stockholm created in RealityCapture by Fredrik Olsson from 317 images in 00h:56m:47s.

Humans have expanded the existing environment to the virtual domain. Virtual artifacts can be seen as an essential cultural phenomenon in modern society. Virtual artifacts bear meanings and functions and since they are part of the world they affect real world events and people's lives.

Virtual artifacts have certain similarities to real-life artifacts even though they do not have physical properties in the traditional sense. However, real-life objects and environments can be simulated in digital environments (like computer games, 3D modeling or virtual reality). Simulated virtual objects (photorealistic VA) and environments have a model in the real world; however, depending on the context, an abstract virtual artifact isn't necessarily dependent on the laws of physics or causality.

Some virtual artifacts are purely abstract in their nature, therefore they can't model real-life objects or phenomena. For example, computer programs or digital user interfaces, while often containing representative components of real-life objects, can't exist in physical terms. These virtual artifacts do not have to be comprehensible to humans at all; they can be created and understood solely by artificial intelligence.

Virtual artifacts can have physical properties (for example color, length) depending on the environment they exist in. These physical properties can be presented and perceived using a certain medium such as a computer screen. On the other hand, virtual artifacts can also contain properties that aren't perceptible. Due to their immaterial nature they can be flexibly accessed, reproduced and archived—even simultaneously by multiple users.

=== Purposes and uses ===
- In the field of archaeology, real world artifacts are modeled/reproduced in a digital environment, where they can be modified, reconstructed, and archived. Also, whole historical sites and buildings (e.g. Theban Mapping Project) are reconstructed in a virtual environment.
- Virtual artifacts are a crucial part of digital, imaginary game worlds.
- Artwork (e.g. paintings, interactive installations, music videos) that is presented/archived in a virtual environment can be considered as a virtual artifact.
- Virtual artifacts (e.g. parts of simulated experiments, models) are used in many areas of scientific research (e.g. medical science, chemistry, astronomy).
- Designers (such as fashion designers, industrial designers, architects) use virtual artifacts (e.g. prototypes, testing environments) in their work process.
- Virtual art, artists using virtual reality, augmented reality and mixed reality as a medium produce virtual artworks.

== Virtual consumerism ==
Virtual artifacts can have a virtual and/or "real" exchange value, and thus can be considered as products. A person or other juristically defined actor can claim ownership and invest money in virtual artifacts. Virtual artifacts can also be valuable in an economical sense outside the environment (e.g. a virtual world such as ones found in massively multiplayer online games) they are created in. For example, game items and characters are valued in terms of real currencies.

Within many virtual worlds, there exists a virtual economy that often mimics real-life commercial features and models such as trading with in-game virtual artifacts, virtual currencies, supply and demand, etc.

There is a viable real-life business model based on the exchange of virtual artifacts within a virtual environment. One example is the social networking game Habbo Hotel; in Habbo-world, users buy virtual products such as furniture for their virtual hotel room with real money. Many online games require a paid subscription for providing access to the game world, creating revenue to the creator of the world.

Moreover, virtual game environments have also created commercial models around them. In fact, the market for virtual artifacts such as game items or virtual property is booming. In China, for example, people are hired to play online games to develop game characters and collect game resources. Furthermore, virtual environments have enabled the production and commercialization of virtual artifacts created by end-users—creating new markets and effectively blurring the line between "real" and virtual consumerism.

== See also ==
- Digital artifactual value
- Digital media
- Simulated reality
- Social artifact
