= CIML community portal =

Virtual scientific community for computational intelligence and machine learning

The computational intelligence and machine learning (CIML) community portal is an international multi-university initiative. Its primary purpose is to help facilitate a virtual scientific community infrastructure for all those involved with, or interested in, computational intelligence and machine learning. This includes CIML research-, education, and application-oriented resources residing at the portal and others that are linked from the CIML site.

== Overview ==
The CIML community portal was created to facilitate an online virtual scientific community wherein anyone interested in CIML can share research, obtain resources, or simply learn more. The effort is currently led by Jacek Zurada (principal investigator), with Rammohan Ragade and Janusz Wojtusiak, aided by a team of 25 volunteer researchers from 13 different countries.

The ultimate goal of the CIML community portal is to accommodate and cater to a broad range of users, including experts, students, the public, and outside researchers interested in using CIML methods and software tools. Each community member and user will be guided through the portal resources and tools based on their respective CIML experience (e.g. expert, student, outside researcher) and goals (e.g. collaboration, education). A preliminary version of the community's portal, with limited capabilities, is now operational and available for users. All electronic resources on the portal are peer-reviewed to ensure high quality and cite-ability for literature.

== See also ==
- Artificial Intelligence
- Computational Intelligence
- Machine Learning
- National Science Foundation
