= Virtuality (disambiguation) =

Virtuality is the quality of having the attributes of something without sharing its (real or imagined) physical form.

Virtuality may also refer to:

== Technology ==
- Virtuality (gaming), a family of virtual reality arcade machines
- Virtuality (software design), a concept of software design proposed by Ted Nelson
- Reality–virtuality continuum, a concept in computer science
- Augmented virtuality, the merging of real-world objects into virtual worlds
- Real Virtuality, a proprietary computer game engine developed by Bohemia Interactive

== Other ==
- Virtuality (philosophy)
- Virtuality (song), by Rush
- "Virtuality", a song by VBirds
- Virtuality (film), a pilot for a science-fiction TV show that was ultimately not commissioned

== See also ==
- Virtual (disambiguation)
