= A Field Guide to Dinosaurs =

1986 book

Cover of book, 1986

A Field Guide to Dinosaurs is a book published by The Diagram Group in 1986

== Contents ==
A Field Guide to Dinosaurs is a guide to more than 300 dinosaurs. For each dinosaur, the book supplies the Latin name; locations it lived; its size, length, height, weight; and the age in which the creatures lived. The best museums displays of the time were also listed.

== Reviews ==
In the August 1993 edition of Dragon (Issue #76), Chris Henderson called this "the best up-to-date saurian book on the market today." He gave high marks to the book for stressing facts rather than artwork, calling the information within "precise, plentiful and easily located." He concluded with a recommendation, saying, "If one wants to add some new wrinkles to a [role-playing game] campaign, or just wants to remain informed about dinosaurs, then this book is the one to purchase."
