= Virtual scientific community =

A virtual scientific community is a group of people, often researchers and students, who share multiple resources related to the scientific field, and whose main medium of communication is the internet. Examples of such communities include the Computational Intelligence and Machine Learning Portal or the Biomedical Informatics Research Network.

There are numerous scientific repositories and websites in existence that, while useful, do not meet the definition of a virtual scientific community. Examples of such are data and scientific literature repositories as well as open access journals.

== See also ==
- Science
- Community
- CIML community portal
