= Virtual friend =

Virtual friend may refer to:

- Chatbot, a software application or web interface designed to have textual or spoken conversations
- Friend class, a class that can access the private and protected members of the class in which it is declared as a friend
- Friend function, a function that is given the same access as methods to private and protected data
- Imaginary friend, a psychological and social phenomenon
- Internet relationship, a relationship between people who have met online
- Virtual pet, a type of artificial human companion
- "Virtual Friend", a song by Armin van Buuren from the 2010 album Mirage

== See also ==
- Friend (disambiguation)
- Virtual (disambiguation)
