= Gregory S. Paul =

American researcher, author and illustrator

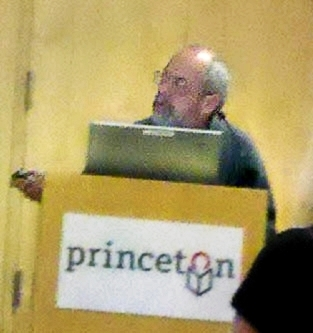
- Paul in 2011
- Born: December 24, 1954 (age 71); Washington D.C., United States
- Known for: Dinosaur renaissance
- Scientific career
- Fields: Paleontology, Paleoart, Sociology
- Workplaces: Independent

Gregory Scott Paul (born December 24, 1954) is an American freelance researcher, author and illustrator who works in paleontology. He is best known for his work and research on theropod dinosaurs and his detailed illustrations, both live and skeletal. Professionally investigating and restoring dinosaurs for three decades, Paul received an on-screen credit as dinosaur specialist on Jurassic Park and Discovery Channel's When Dinosaurs Roamed America and Dinosaur Planet. He is the author and illustrator of Predatory Dinosaurs of the World (1988), The Complete Illustrated Guide to Dinosaur Skeletons (1996), Dinosaurs of the Air (2001), three editions of The Princeton Field Guide to Dinosaurs (2010, 2016 & 2024), Gregory S. Paul's Dinosaur Coffee Table Book (2010), The Princeton Field Guide to Pterosaurs (2022), The Princeton Field Guide to Mesozoic Sea Reptiles (2022) and editor of The Scientific American Book of Dinosaurs (2000).

Paul's contributions are also notable in the philosophical realm of the problem of evil.

== Paleontology ==
=== Illustrations ===
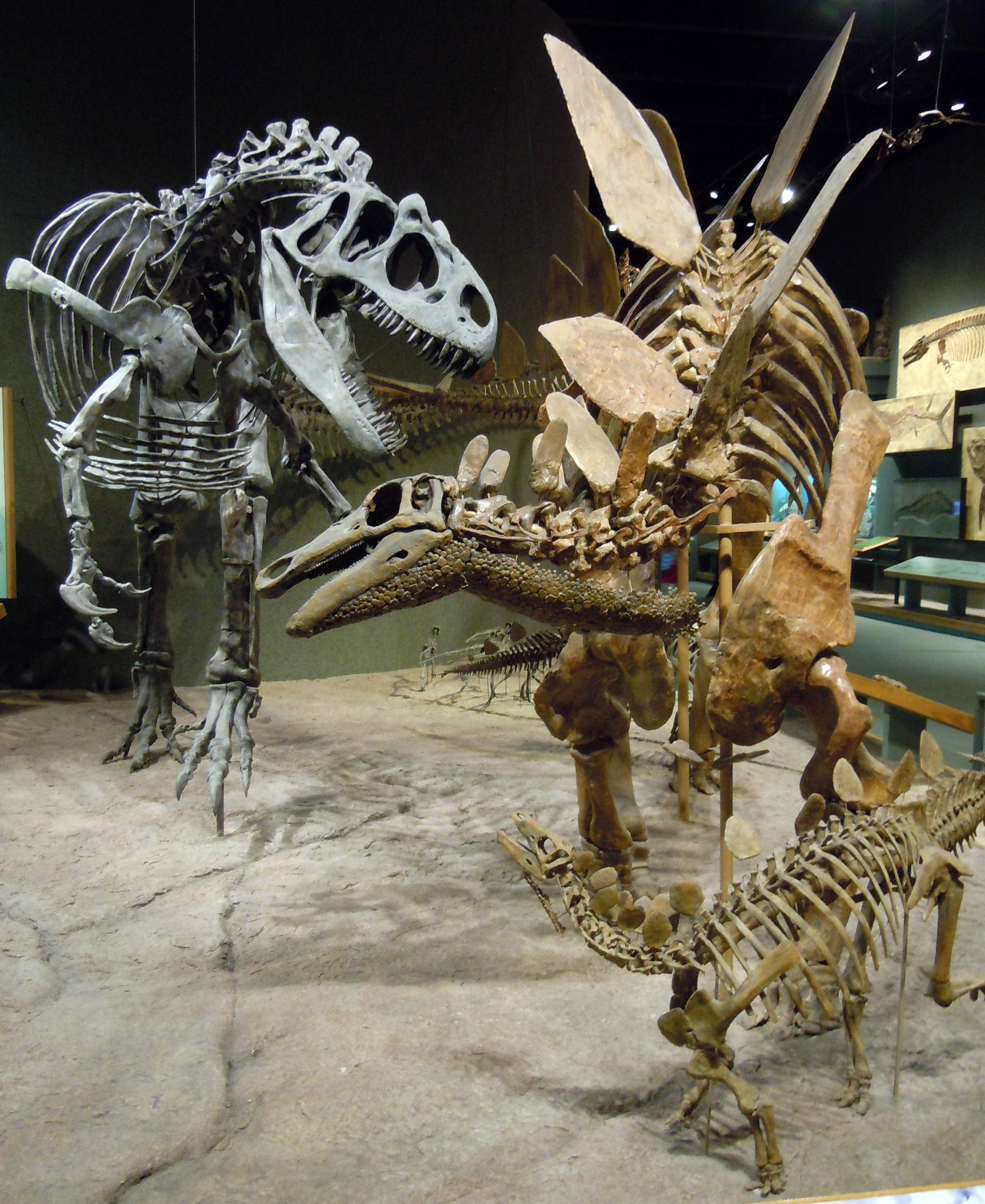
Stegosaurus stenops and Allosaurus fragilis mounts posed after illustrations made by Gregory S. Paul, Denver Museum of Nature and Science

Paul helped pioneer the "new look" of dinosaurs in the 1970s. Through a series of dynamic ink drawings and oil paintings he was among the first professional artists to depict them as active, warm-blooded and – in the case of the small ones – feathered. Many later dinosaur illustrations are a reflection of his anatomical insights or even a direct imitation of his style. The fact that he worked closely with paleontologists, did his own independent paleontological research and created a series of skeletal restorations of all sufficiently known dinosaurs, lead many to regard his images as a sort of scientific standard to be followed. This tendency is stimulated by his habit of constantly redrawing older work to let it reflect the latest finds and theories. Much of it is in black-and-white, in ink or colored pencil. Sculptors have used these anatomical templates as a resource for decades, and still do today many unauthorized and uncredited. Even one of his scientific critics, Storrs L. Olson, described him in a review in the Scientific American as "a superior artist". He was inspired by classic paleoartists such as Charles R. Knight, and has a fondness for the dinosaur restorations of the little-known artist Bill Berry.

Paul's line art and paintings have been published in over 100 popular books and shown in more documentaries than other modern paleoartists including several television programs such as The Nature of Things, NOVA, Horizon, and PaleoWorld.

=== Research ===
From 1977 to 1984, Paul was an informal research associate and illustrator for Robert Bakker in the Earth and Planetary Sciences department at Johns Hopkins University in Baltimore. Paul lacks a formal degree in paleontology, but has participated in numerous field expeditions and has authored or co-authored over 30 scientific papers and over 40 popular science articles. Paul proposed that some of the bird-like feathered theropods were winged fliers, and that others were secondarily flightless, an idea supported by some fossils from China. Paul proposed the controversial thermoregulatory concept of "terramegathermy", which argues that only animals with high basal metabolic rates can exceed one tonne on land. Paul has named the following dinosaurs, alone or with co-authors:

- Avisaurus archibaldi (genus and species, with Brett-Surman; a bird)
- Giraffatitan brancai (genus)
- Acrocanthosaurus altispinax (species, unnecessary replacement name for Altispinax dunkeri)
- Albertosaurus megagracilis (species, later renamed Dinotyrannus megagracilis, now considered a juvenile Tyrannosaurus rex)
- Aublysodon molnari (species, later renamed Stygivenator molnari, now considered a juvenile Tyrannosaurus rex or a juvenile Nanotyrannus)
- Potamornis skutchi (genus and species, with Elzanowski & Stidham; a bird)
- Mantellisaurus atherfieldensis (genus)
- Dakotadon lakotaensis (genus)
- Dollodon bampingi (genus and species, now considered synonymous with Mantellisaurus)
- Huxleysaurus hollingtoniensis (genus, now considered synonymous with Hypselospinus)
- Darwinsaurus evolutionis (genus and species, now considered synonymous with Hypselospinus)
- Mantellodon carpenteri (genus and species, now considered synonymous with Mantellisaurus)
- Tyrannosaurus imperator (species, with Persons & van Raalte; considered conspecific with Tyrannosaurus rex by palaeontologists)
- Tyrannosaurus regina (species, with Persons & van Raalte; considered conspecific with Tyrannosaurus rex by palaeontologists)
- Utetitan zellaguymondeweyae (genus and species)

=== Books ===
- Predatory Dinosaurs of the World (1988)
- The Complete Illustrated Guide to Dinosaur Skeletons (1996)
- Dinosaurs of the Air (2002)
- The Princeton Field Guide to Dinosaurs (2010) revised 2016, 2024
- Gregory S. Paul's Dinosaur Coffee Table Book (2010)
- The Princeton Field Guide to Pterosaurs (2022)
- The Princeton Field Guide to Mesozoic Sea Reptiles (2022)
- The Princeton Field Guide to Predatory Dinosaurs (2024)
- The Princeton Field Guide to Sauropod and Prosauropod Dinosaurs (2026)
- The Scientific American Book of Dinosaurs (editor, 2000)

== Philosophy ==
Paul has also weighed in on philosophy, more specifically on the problem of evil as an argument against theism. His article published in the journal Philosophy and Theology in 2007, entitled "Theodicy's Problem: A Statistical Look at the Holocaust of the Children and the Implications of Natural Evil for the Free Will and Best of All Worlds Hypothesis" presents a statical formulation of the problem of natural evil and child death. He says that statistics can be used to assess whether or not God is good based on the numbers of children that die before they can reach an age where they are able to make an informed judgement about religion. Paul rejects the idea that suffering allows us to grow and change, as many children suffer or die before they are able to do these things. Paul concludes that the universe is not actually perfect for human flourishing, but is rather a death trap for children, and that if there is a God who created the universe, they are not worthy of worship.

== See also ==
- Dinosaur renaissance
- Feathered dinosaurs
- Paleoart
