= Friend (surname) =

Friend is a surname. Notable people with the surname include:

- Andy Friend (born 1969), Australian rugby union coach
- Bill Friend (engineer) (died 2021), American executive, Bechtel president in the 1980s
- Bill Friend (politician) (born 1949), American politician
- Bob Friend (1930–2019), American Major League baseball player
- Bob Friend (newscaster) (1938–2008), British newscaster
- Charlotte Friend (1921–1987), American virologist
- Clayton Friend (born 1964), New Zealand professional rugby league player
- Cliff Friend (1893–1974), American songwriter and pianist
- Danny Friend (1873–1942), American Major League baseball player
- Donald Friend (1915–1989), Australian artist, writer and diarist
- George Friend (born 1987), English footballer
- George Friend (parliamentary official) (1835–1898), 3rd Clerk of the New Zealand House of Representatives
- Harold Friend (1902–?), English footballer
- Hugo Friend (1882–1966), American athlete
- Jacob Elias Friend (1857–1912), American state legislator, lawyer and businessman
- Jake Friend (born 1990), Australian rugby league player
- James Friend, Academy Award-winning British cinematographer
- John Friend (disambiguation), multiple people
- John Albert Newton Friend (1881–1966), British chemist
- Kevin Friend (born 1971), British football referee
- Lonn Friend (born 1956), American journalist and author
- Lovick Friend (1856–1944), British Army major general
- Marian Friend (1923–2025), American philanthropist
- Matthew Curling Friend (1792–1871), Australian inventor and public servant
- Natasha Friend (born 1972), American author
- Nathan Friend (born 1981), Australian rugby league footballer
- Oscar J. Friend (1897–1963), American pulp-fiction author
- Owen Friend (1927–2007), American Major League Baseball player
- Patricia A. Friend, American International President of the Association of Flight Attendants
- Peter Friend (author), New Zealand science fiction author
- Peter Friend (geologist) (1934–2025), British sedimentologist
- Peter Friend (surgeon), director of the Oxford Transplant Centre
- Phyllis Friend (1922–2013), British nurse
- Quinton Friend (born 1982), South African cricketer
- Rachel Friend (born 1970), Australian actress
- Richard Friend (born 1953), British physicist
- Rob Friend (born 1981), Canadian soccer player
- Robert Friend (poet) (1913–1998), American poet
- Robert Friend (pilot) (1920–2019), US Air Force lieutenant colonel and Tuskegee Airman
- Rupert Friend (born 1981), English actor
- Simon Friend (born 1967), English singer-songwriter
- Tad Friend (born 1962), American journalist
- Theodore Friend (1931–2020), American academic
- Tom Friend (born 1991), English cricketer
- Travis Friend (born 1981), Zimbabwean international cricketer
- William Benedict Friend (1931–2015), Roman Catholic Bishop of the Diocese of Shreveport, Louisiana

== See also ==
- Senator Friend (disambiguation)
- Friends (disambiguation)
