= Qatar Airways =

National airline of Qatar

Qatar Airways الخطوط الجوية القطرية al-Khuṭūṭ al-Jawwiyya al-Qaṭariya

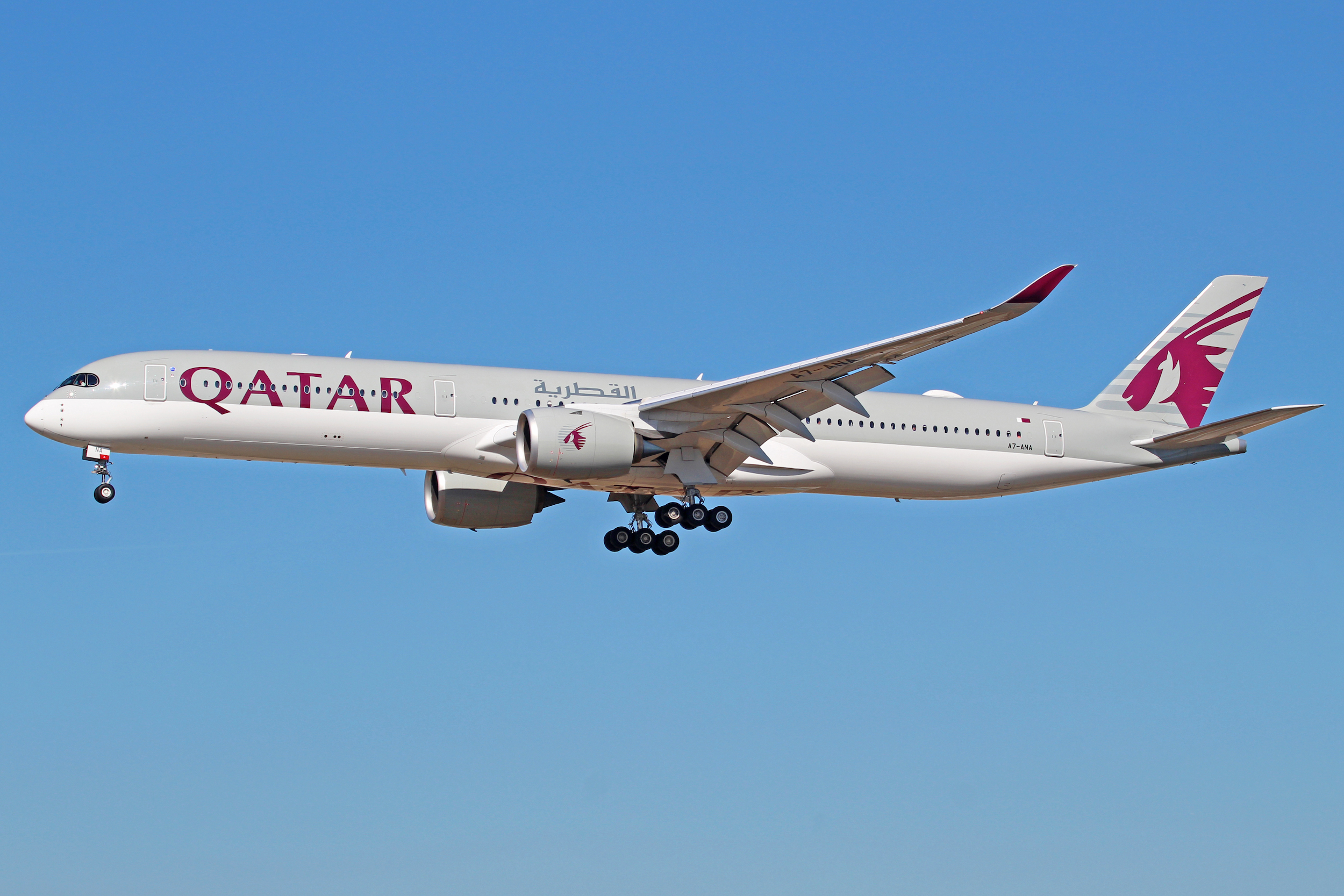
- A Qatar Airways Airbus A350-1000
IATA	ICAO	Call sign
QR	QTR	QATARI
- Founded: November 22, 1993; 32 years ago
- Commenced operations: January 20, 1994; 32 years ago
- Hubs: Hamad International Airport
- Frequent-flyer program: Qatar Airways Privilege Club (Avios; formerly Qmiles)
- Alliance: Oneworld
- Subsidiaries: Qatar Airways Cargo; The Qatar Aircraft Catering Company; Qatar Airways Holidays; United Media International; Qatar Duty Free; Qatar Aviation Services; Qatar Distribution Company; Qatar Executive
- Fleet size: 230
- Destinations: 198
- Parent company: Government of Qatar
- Headquarters: Qatar Airways Towers, Doha, Qatar
- Key people: Hamad Ali Al-Khater (CEO); Abdulla Ali (COO)
- Revenue: ▲QR 76,274 million (March 2023)
- Operating income: ▲QR 11,860 million (March 2023)
- Net income: ▼QR 4,406 million (March 2023)
- Total assets: ▲QR 151,857 million (March 2023)
- Employees: 48,475 (March 2023)
- Website: www.qatarairways.com

Qatar Airways Company Q.C.S.C. (Arabic: الخطوط الجوية القطرية, al-Qaṭariyya), operating as Qatar Airways, is the flag carrier of Qatar. It was established by the government of Qatar in 1993, and has been 100% state-owned since 2013. Headquartered in the Qatar Airways Tower in Doha, the airline operates a hub-and-spoke network, with 170 international routes from its base at Hamad International Airport. The airline currently operates a fleet of more than 200 aircraft. Qatar Airways Group employs more than 43,000 people. The carrier has been a member of the Oneworld alliance since October 2013, and the official company slogan has been "Going Places Together", since 2015. The airline has faced controversies over employee pay and working conditions, as well as accusations of bribery to European politicians.

== History ==
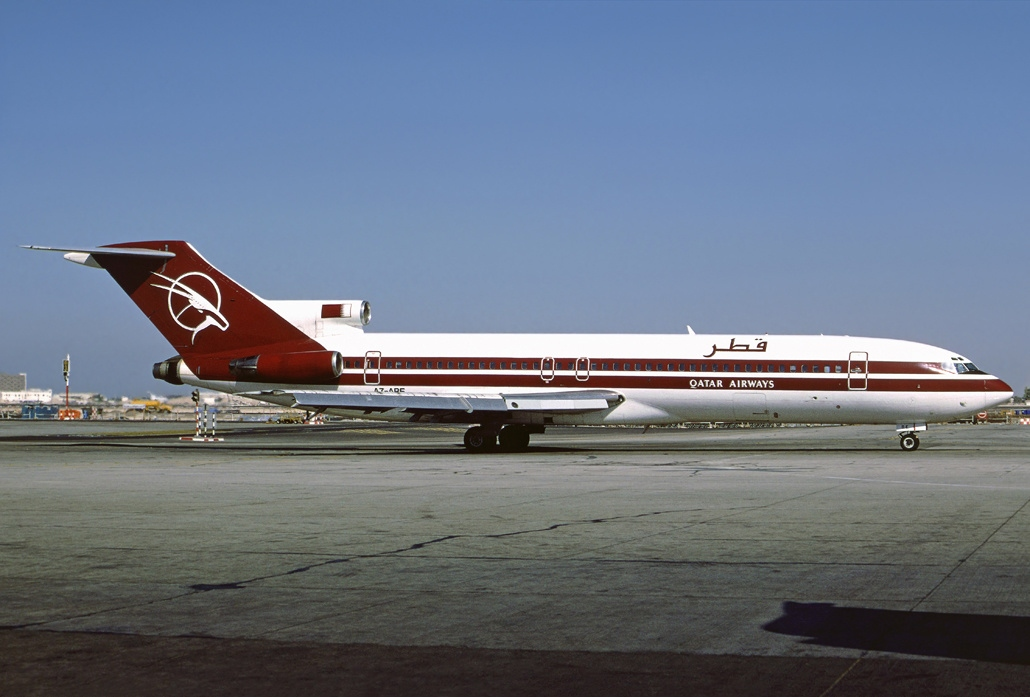
A Qatar Airways Boeing 727-200 at Dubai International Airport in 1996

=== Origin ===
From 1974 until May 2002, the State of Qatar was a joint-owner member of Gulf Air along with Oman, the UAE state of Abu Dhabi, and the Kingdom of Bahrain. It became the first among the three countries to withdraw from the airline, although it remained a member of Gulf Air for six months after the government announced its complete termination.

=== Foundation ===
Qatar Airways was established by the government of Qatar on November 22, 1993; operations began on January 20, 1994. Amman was the airline's first destination in May 1994. In April 1995, CEO Sheikh Hamad Bin Ali Bin Jabor Al Thani had employed a staff of 75. By this time the fleet consisted of two Airbus A310s that served a route network including Abu Dhabi, Bangkok, Cairo, Dubai, Khartoum, Kuwait, Madras, Manila, Muscat, Sharjah, Taipei, Tokyo and Trivandrum. During 1995, two ex-All Nippon Airways Boeing 747s were purchased from Boeing. The airline acquired a second-hand Boeing 747SP from Air Mauritius in 1996.

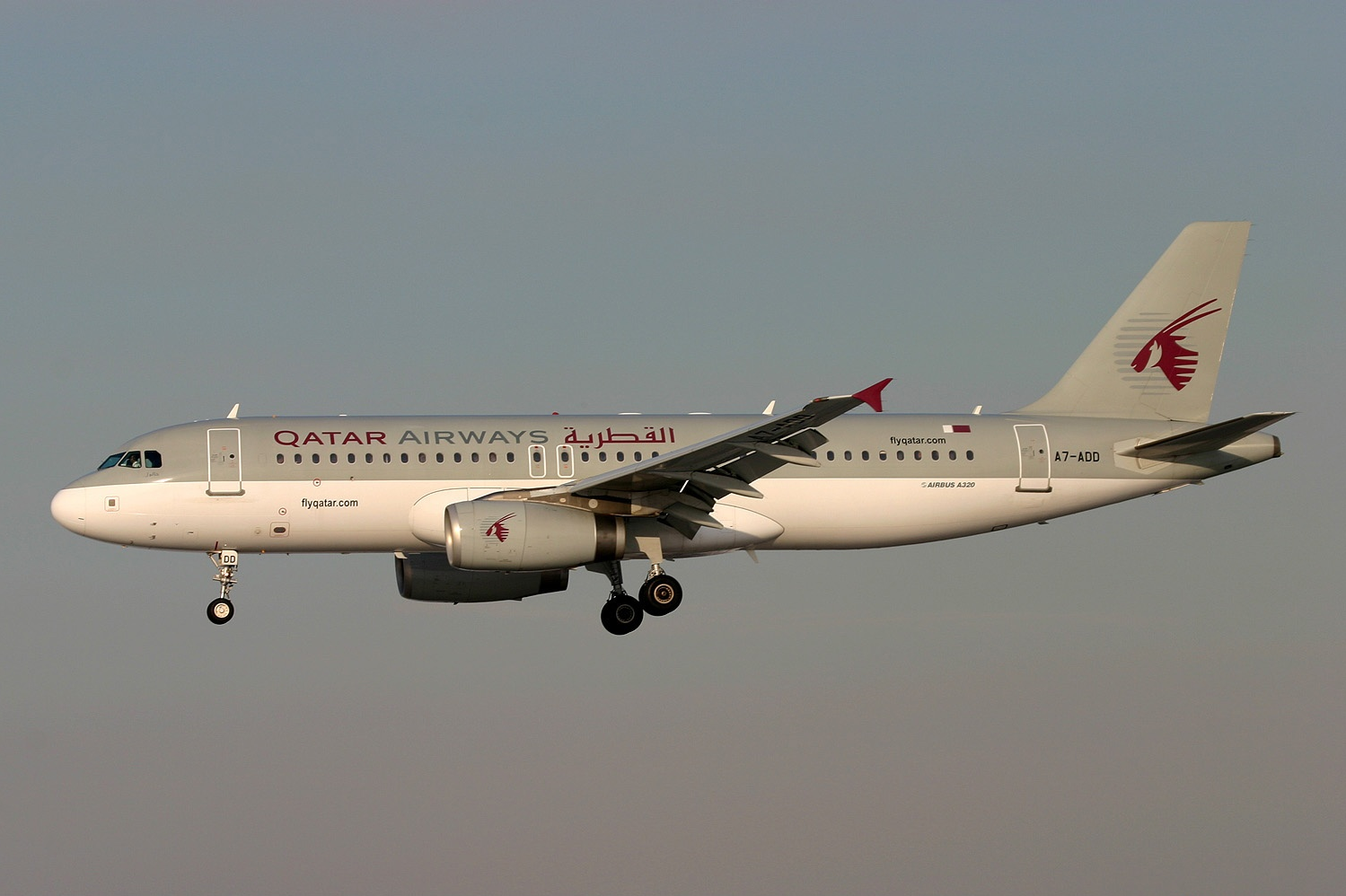
A Qatar Airways Airbus A320-200 in the old livery

Services to Athens, Istanbul, Madras and Tunis were discontinued in late 1996, whereas Calcutta and Muscat were removed from the route network in January and September 1997, respectively. Flights to London were launched during 1997. The airline also took delivery of two second-hand 231-seater Airbus A300-600R aircraft on lease from Ansett Worldwide Aviation Services (AWAS) during the year. A new logo was also revealed with the introduction of the new aircraft. A third A300-600R joined the fleet shortly afterwards, also on lease from AWAS. In July 1998 the carrier placed a firm order with Airbus for six Airbus A320s, slated for delivery between 2001 and 2005; it also took options for five more aircraft of the type. Also in 1998, the carrier struck a deal with Singapore Aircraft Leasing Enterprise (SALE) for the lease of four Airbus A320s, with deliveries scheduled between February and April 1999; these latter four aircraft were aimed at replacing the Boeing 727-200 Advanced fleet. The airline took delivery of the first A320 powered by Aero Engines V2500 on lease from SALE in February 1999.

=== 2000s ===
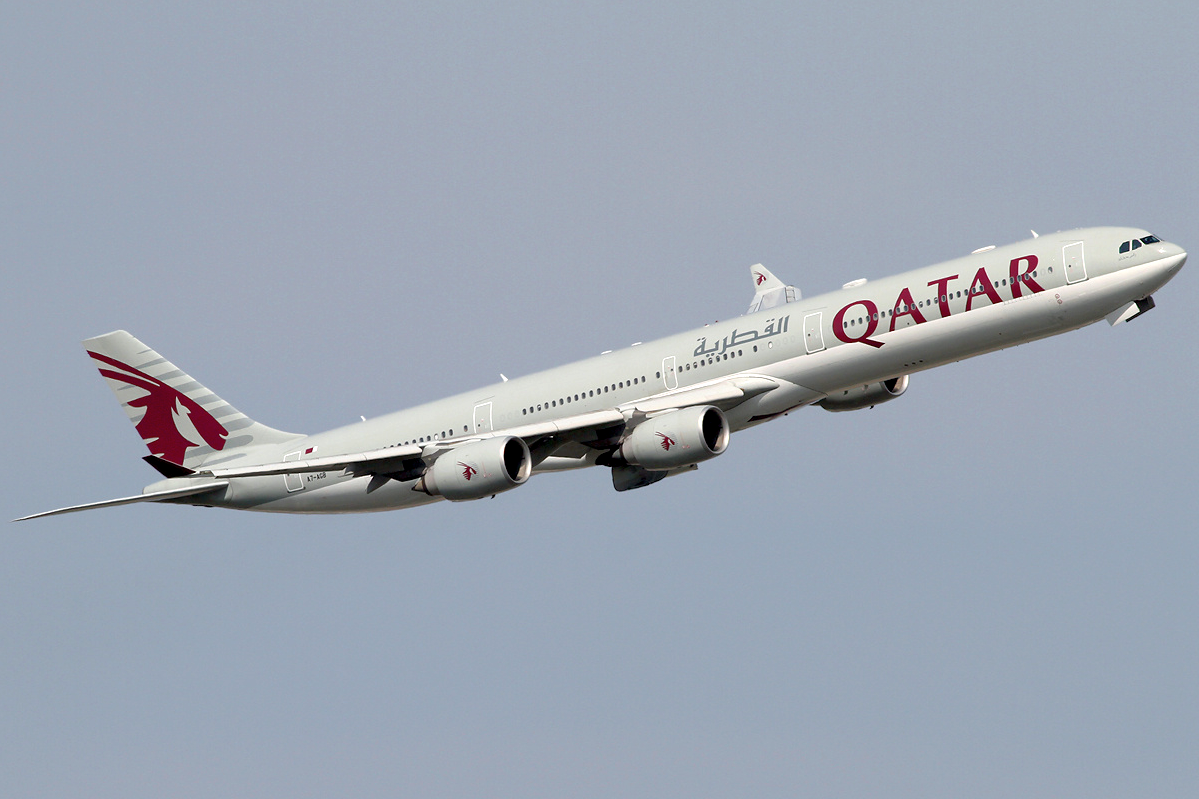
A Qatar Airways Airbus A340-600. The airline became a customer for the type in 2003.

A fourth A300-600R on lease from AWAS joined the fleet in April 2000. In October 2000, Qatar Airways ordered an International Aero Engines V2500-powered Airbus A319CJ and took an option for another aircraft of the type. The airline became the Airbus A380's ninth customer in 2001 when two aircraft of the type were ordered, plus two options. Also that year, the airline resumed services to Jakarta. A year later, in May, Qatar withdrew from Gulf Air to ensure the development of its national airline.

In June 2003, Qatar Airways was the first airline that resumed international services to Iraq when it flew the Doha–Basra route. Also that month, the airline incorporated its first dedicated cargo aircraft into the fleet. It was an Airbus A300-600R that was converted to freighter in Germany for US$10 million. Also in June 2003 at the Paris Air Show, the carrier placed an order with Airbus valued at US$5.1 billion for two Airbus A321s, 14 Airbus A330s and two Airbus A340-600s. The deal included eight A330-200s and six -300s; it also included options for further six A330-300s and eight A340-600s. The first aircraft were scheduled to enter the fleet in 2004, with the A340-600 slated for delivery in 2006. During the year the airline started serving the Chinese market with the introduction of flights to Shanghai. Also in 2003, the carrier expanded its portfolio of destinations with the commencement of services to Manchester in April, Tripoli in November, and Cebu and Singapore in December. During the 2003 Dubai Air Show the airline firmed up an earlier commitment for two Airbus A380s and took options for another two of these aircraft. The value of the transaction was US$1.2 billion. It was also in 2003 that Qatar Airways became the first airline to be audited under the new IATA operational audit programme, IOSA.

The Qatar Airways Group —which included Qatar Airways, Doha International Airport and corporate business air services, ground handling and in-flight catering companies— reported its first profit ever for the fiscal year (FY) that ended in March 2004. The FY2004 saw the airline transporting 3.35 million passengers. Zürich became the carrier's 53rd destination worldwide in July 2004; Yangon was added to the list of destinations in December the same year. A new service to Osaka was launched in March 2005. Its first A340 was delivered on September 8, 2006.

In May 2007, Qatar Airways and Airbus signed a memorandum of understanding (MoU) for the acquisition of 80 Airbus A350 XWBs, including 20 Airbus A350-800s and 20 aircraft of the –900 and –1000 variant, respectively, with the first aircraft initially slated for delivery in 2013. The agreement was firmed up in June during the 2007 Paris Air Show; three more Airbus A380s were also made part of the order. In July of the same year, during the unveiling ceremony of the Boeing 787 in Everett, Qatar Airways was recognised as a future customer for the type when its logo appeared on one side of the brand new aircraft. By that time, the airline had not acknowledged that it had placed an order for a number of these new aircraft. In November the same year, a firm order for 30 Boeing 787-8s, plus options for 35 more aircraft of the –9 or –10 variant, was confirmed. The order also included 14 Boeing 777-300ERs, six Boeing 777-200LRs and seven Boeing 777Fs, whereas five more aircraft of the type were on option. The combined order was valued at US$13.5 billion. The airline took delivery of its first 335-seater Boeing 777-300ER in late November 2007. The route network grew further during 2007 with the incorporation of Newark in June, Nagpur —the carrier's seventh destination in India— in September, and Stockholm in November. A new scheduled service to New York-JFK that commenced in November 2008 replaced the Newark route. The first two Boeing 777-200LRs were handed over by the aircraft manufacturer in February 2009. On June 15 of the same year, at the Paris Air Show, Qatar Airways ordered 20 Airbus A320 and four Airbus A321 aircraft worth $1.9bn. On October 12, 2009, the company completed the world's first commercial passenger flight powered by a fuel made from natural gas. Also in 2009, Qatar Airways launched its first scheduled flights to Australia with Melbourne being the first city served; routes to Chengdu, Hangzhou, Phnom Penh and Clark International Airport in the Philippines were launched during 2009 as well.

=== 2010s ===
Tokyo-Narita was first served by the carrier in April 2010. On May 18, 2010, the airline put its first Boeing 777F (A7-BFA) into service, with a flight from Doha to Amsterdam. The aircraft had been delivered on May 14, 2010. The airline has launched 22 new destinations since 2010, with nine more destinations announced: Ankara, Aleppo, Bangalore, Barcelona, Brussels, Bucharest, Budapest, Buenos Aires, Copenhagen, Hanoi, Montreal, Nice, Phuket, São Paulo, Shiraz, Kolkata, Medina, Oslo, Sofia, Stuttgart, Venice and Tokyo. Qatar Airways also launched Benghazi and Entebbe during 2011. Service to Baku and Tbilisi, originally planned for 2011, was delayed until February 1, 2012, due to "operational issues".

Boeing's handover of a Boeing 777-200LR in September 2011 marked Qatar Airways receiving its 100th aircraft from this aircraft manufacturer. In November the same year, at the Dubai Airshow, the airline ordered 55 Airbus planes: 50 A320neo and five A380, in addition to two Boeing 777 freighters.

In July 2012, Perth became the second city served in Australia. On October 8, 2012, Qatar Airways announced it would join Oneworld within the forthcoming 18 months. The entrance of the carrier into the alliance was mentored by British Airways. The joining ceremony took place on October 29, 2013.

On November 12, 2012, Qatar Airways became the seventh carrier worldwide to acquire the Dreamliner, when Boeing handed over the airline's first aircraft of the type; it was the first delivered to a Middle Eastern airline. The aircraft was deployed on the Doha–Dubai corridor on November 20. Dreamliner services on the long-haul Doha–London-Heathrow route commenced on December 13, with the airline becoming the first one to offer regular services to the United Kingdom using this aircraft. During 2013, Qatar Airways launched flights to Gassim in Saudi Arabia, Basra and Najaf in Iraq, Phnom Penh, (Note: It had been previously informed that the carrier launched flights to this destination in 2009.) Salalah and Chicago. Services to Ethiopia began in September 2013.

In February 2013, Qatar Airways opened its European Customer Service centre in Wrocław, Poland.

In June 2013, the airline firmed up an order for two Boeing 777-300ER aircraft plus seven options. On November 17, 2013, the first day of the Dubai Airshow, Qatar Airways purchased 50 Boeing 777-9Xs. The commitment was firmed up during the 2014 Farnborough Air Show in a deal worth US$18.9 billion; purchase rights for another 50 aircraft of the type were also taken. In addition, the transaction included firm orders for four Boeing 777Fs plus options for another four with a combined value of US$2.7 billion. Deliveries of the passenger aircraft are expected to start in 2020.

Following the assumption of power by emir Tamim bin Hamad Al Thani in June 2013, Qatar Airways became fully state-owned. The 50% stake previously owned by former prime minister Hamad bin Jassim Al Thani and other stakeholders was bought out by the government. This coincided with Hamad bin Jassim leaving his other public positions, such as those of foreign minister and chief executive of the Qatar Investment Authority, after Tamim became emir.

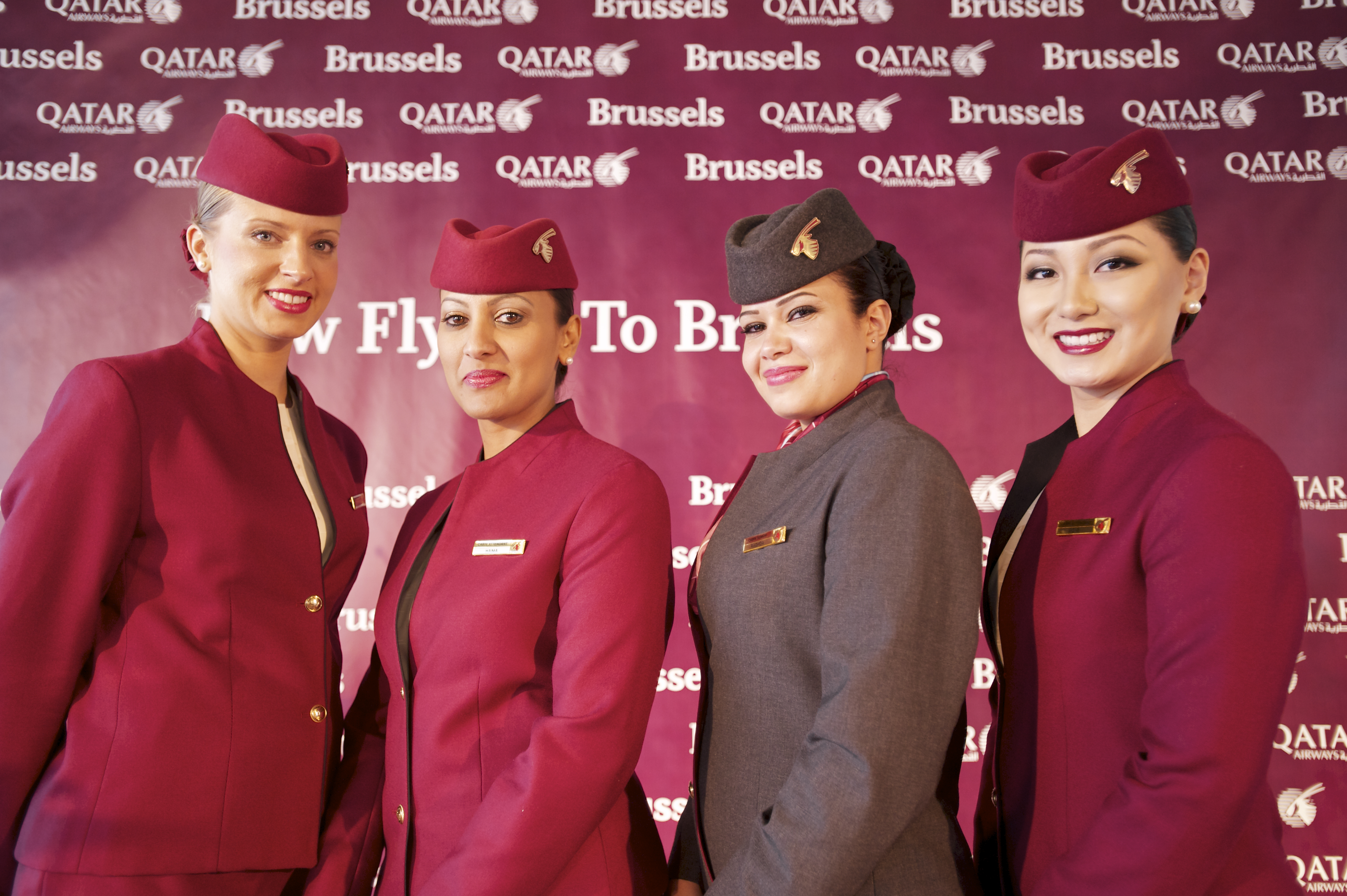
Qatar Airways' flight attendants

An all-business class flight to London-Heathrow was launched in May 2014 with Airbus A319LR aircraft. Flights to Edinburgh were launched in May 2014. The carrier expected to take delivery of its first three Airbus A380 aircraft in June 2014, with plans for the aircraft to be displayed at the Farnborough Air Show. There were intentions to first deploy the type on the Doha–London-Heathrow route starting June 17; another two undisclosed European points would likely become served with the A380. In late May 2014, it was reported that the delivery of the aircraft would be delayed by several weeks. Further delays shifted the start of A380 services to London to August 1, 2014. Delivery of the first aircraft of the type finally took place on September 16, 2014. A380 services to London commenced in October 2014. The airline became the launch customer for the A350 XWB; the first Airbus A350-900 was handed over to the company on December 22, 2014, and had its first revenue flight to Frankfurt almost a month later, on January 15, 2015.

In January 2015, the airline concluded an order for four Boeing 777Fs in a deal worth US$1.24 billion; Qatar Airways also took purchase rights on four more aircraft of the type. In June 2015, it was disclosed that Qatar Airways had ordered ten Boeing 777-8Xs and four additional Boeing 777Fs for US$4.18 billion.

In August 2015, Qatar Airways was forced to relax its policy of sacking cabin crew for getting pregnant or marrying in their first five years of employment. A spokeswoman stated, "our policies have evolved with the airline's growth". Under the new regulations, "we will provide an opportunity for someone to continue working in a ground position", the spokeswoman said.

In January 2016, the carrier received its first Boeing 747 nose loader. In 2016, American Airlines, Delta Air Lines, and United Airlines claimed that their forensic investigators had uncovered documents that allegedly indicated that Qatar Airways had received more than $7 billion in aid from the Qatari government. According to reports, the investigation was conducted by Wilmer Cutler Pickering Hale and Dorr LLP. In July 2016, the U.S. Department of State held talks with Qatar government officials regarding the allegations of unfair competition. No formal action was taken by the Department of State. Qatar Airways has denied allegations that subsidies were received and Qatar Airways CEO Akbar Al Baker condemned the accusations.

As of February 5, 2017, the airline had the longest regularly scheduled flight of a commercial airline, between Doha and Auckland. On September 1, 2017, it was announced that Qatar Airways bought 49% of AQA Holding, the new shareholder of Meridiana.

In November 2018, the airline announced it would expand its flights to Iran, landing at Tehran and Shiraz, as of January 2019, and to Isfahan in February. In December 2018, the CEO of Qatar Airways, Akbar Al Baker, threatened to pull the company out of the Oneworld alliance in February, following accusations that alliance members Qantas and American Airlines engaged in "hostile business practices" against his carrier. In 2018, during an annual meeting of the International Air Transport Association, the CEO of Qatar Airways, Akbar Al Baker, claimed that a woman could not do his job as "it is a very challenging position." Upon receiving backlash regarding his comments, Al Baker explained that he did not intend to refer to all women at Qatar Airways. He also mentioned that he would love to have a female CEO running the company after him. Since then, Al Baker has apologised for his comments in a statement that was provided to The Independent.

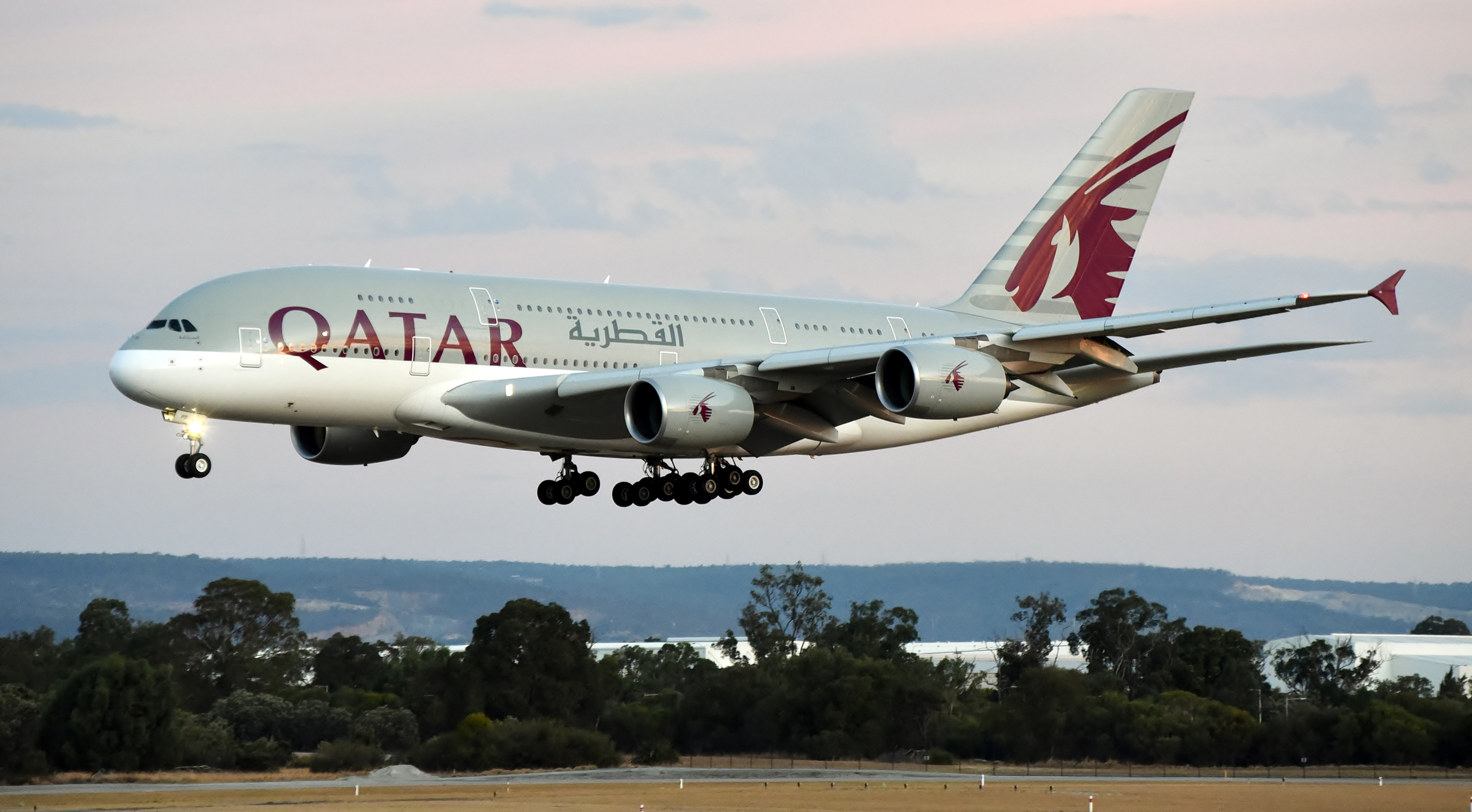
A Qatar Airways Airbus A380 in Perth in 2023

On April 30, 2019, Qatar Airways retired its last Airbus A340-600 from service after around 16 years of service. The last flight was QR835 from Bangkok Suvarnabhumi International Airport to Hamad International Airport. The removal from service was to lower the age of its fleet as well as its ineffectiveness compared to the Boeing 777 as stated by CEO Akbar Al Baker in 2009.

=== 2020s ===
In July 2023, the Government of Australia blocked an expansion plan from Qatar Airways that would have seen the carrier double its flights to Brisbane, Melbourne, Perth and Sydney. The government intervention was supported by Australian flag-carrier and rival airline Qantas, who argued that Qatar's flights would "distort the market", while the government dismissed criticism from Qatar Airways and tourism operators, stating that Qatar Airways' route expansion is against Australia's national interest.

In October 2023, Qatar Airways announced a collaboration with Starlink to provide high-speed in-flight internet.

In March 2024, Qatar Airways announced Sama 2.0, an "AI cabin crew." In August 2024 a 25% shareholding in Airlink was acquired.

In February 2025, Qatar Airways acquired a 25% stake in Virgin Australia Holdings.

== Corporate affairs ==
=== Business trends ===
The key trends for Qatar Airways are (as of the financial year ending March 31):

	Revenue (QAR b)	Net income (QAR b)	Number of employees	Passengers flown (m)	Cargo carried (000 tonnes)	Fleet size	Ref
2016	35.6	1.6	39,369	35.6	954	190	
2017	39.3	1.9	43,113	32.0	1,153	215	
2018	42.2	−0.25	45,633	29.1	1,359	233	
2019	48.1	−2.3	46,685	29.4	1,452	250	
2020	51.1	−7.0	50,110	32.3	1,493	258	
2021	29.3	−14.8	36,707	5.8	2,727	250	
2022	52.3	5.6	41,026	18.5	3,000	257	
2023	76.2	4.4	48,475	31.7	2,694	265	
2024	80.4	6.1	53,182	40.0	3,044	284	

=== Key people ===
As of December 2025, the Qatar Airways' CEO is Hamad Ali Al‑Khater, who replaced Badr Mohammed Al‑Meer. Al-Meer had succeeded longtime CEO Akbar Al Baker, who stepped down in November 2023, having served as the airline's CEO since November 1996. As of June 2026, Abdulla Ali holds the COO position.

=== Ownership and subsidiaries ===
Qatar Airways has been fully controlled by the government since July 2013, following the buyout of a 50% stake from former prime minister Hamad bin Jassin Al Thani and other shareholders. At March 2023, the Qatar Airways Group employed more than 48,000 people, of whom 32,000 worked directly for the airline. Qatar Airways has been described as an example of "soft power" diplomacy by the authoritarian government in Qatar to rebrand the state. Human rights organisations have criticised Qatar Airways for its relationship with the Qatari state, citing the poor human rights record in Qatar. Qatar Airways is as of February 2020 the largest shareholder in International Airlines Group (IAG) with 25.1% of the shares.

==== Divisions ====
Qatar Airways has many divisions, including Qatar Aircraft Catering Company, Doha International Airport, Qatar Airways Holidays, United Media Int, Qatar Duty Free, Qatar Aviation Services, Qatar Distribution Company, and Qatar Executive.

===== Cargo =====
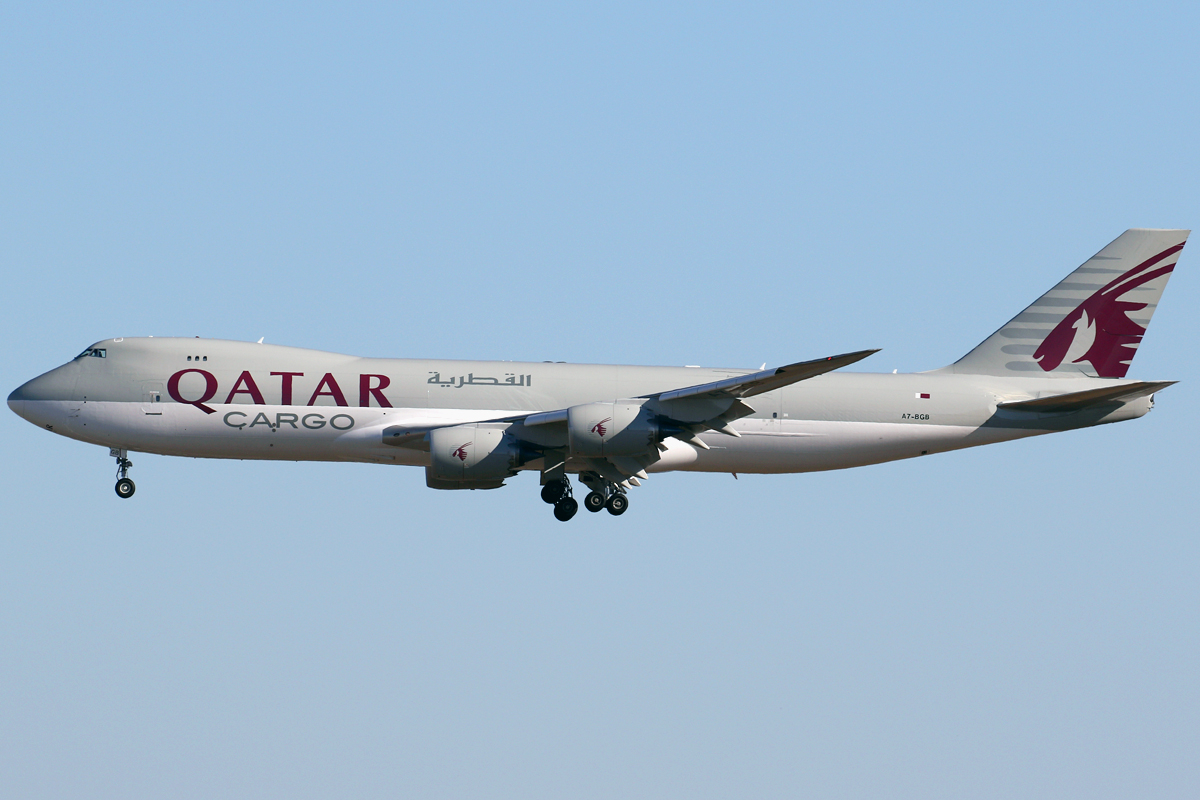
Qatar Airways Cargo Boeing 747-8F

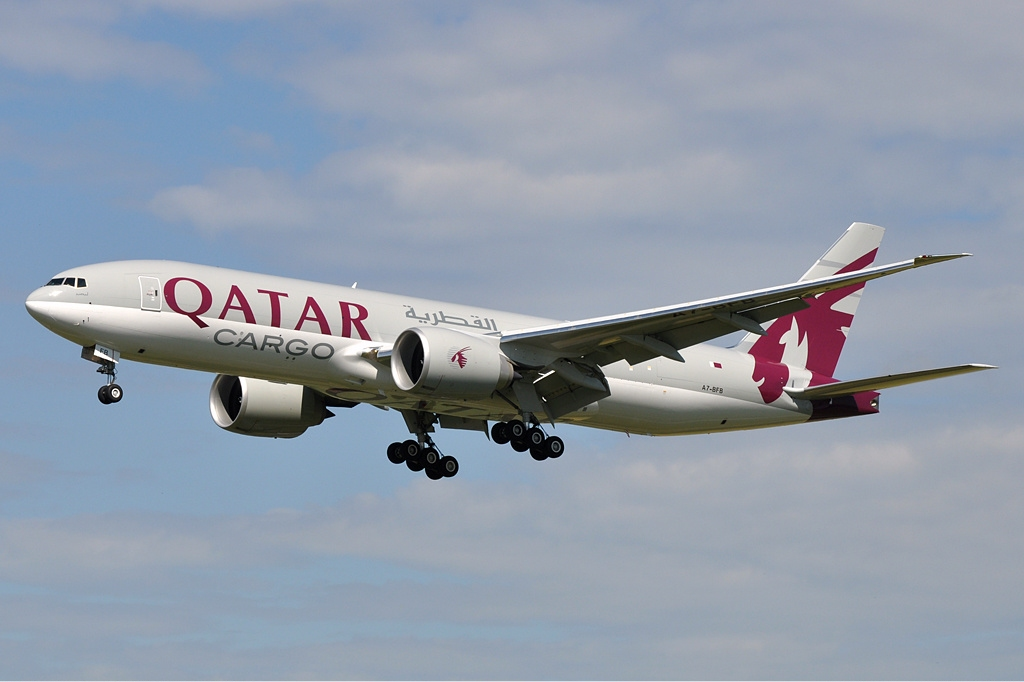
Qatar Airways Cargo Boeing 777F

Qatar Airways Cargo, the airline's freight branch, is the world's third largest international cargo carrier. Dedicated cargo flights to Cairo International Airport were launched in June 2009 complementing the passenger services already operated.

On August 18, 2010, the airline launched its first US-dedicated cargo service from its hub in Doha to Chicago–O'Hare with a stop-over in Amsterdam, Netherlands using Boeing 777 freighter aircraft.

On March 13, 2013, Qatar Airways Cargo first of three A330F was delivered provided on lease from BOC aviation replacing A300-600F.

Global Supply Systems operated three Boeing 747-8F aircraft under a wet lease arrangement for British Airways World Cargo until BA terminated the contract early on January 17, 2014. An agreement with Qatar Airways to operate flights for IAG Cargo using Boeing 777F was announced on the same day.

On March 18, 2015, Qatar Airways Cargo announced that starting April 4, 2015, will launch a twice-weekly Boeing 777 Freighter service to Los Angeles which will become Qatar Airways Cargo's fourth US freighter destination alongside Houston, Chicago and Atlanta.

On December 27, 2016, Qatar Airways Cargo announced that it will launch freighter operations to four new destinations in the Americas, Boeing 777 freighters will fly twice a week to the South American cities of Buenos Aires, São Paulo, Quito and the North American city of Miami starting February 2, 2017.

===== Qatar Executive =====
Qatar Executive is a corporate jet subsidiary of Qatar Airways, with its livery sporting a white fuselage with a slightly smaller Oryx painted in the airline's traditional colours of burgundy and grey.

The Royal fleet of Qatar Amiri Flight is also painted in full Qatar Airways livery, although they are not part of the airline or Qatar Executive.

===== Al Maha Airways =====
Al Maha Airways was a proposed airline to serve the Saudi Arabian market. It used a similar livery, except in green instead of burgundy. It was planned to launch in September 2014 and by May 2015 the airline had already taken delivery of 4 Airbus A320 aircraft.

In February 2017, Qatar Airways announced that the Al Maha Airways project had been cancelled and the airline would not start operations due to ongoing issues gaining its operational license and the Qatar diplomatic crisis.

=== Livery ===
Qatar Airways has an oryx, the national animal of the State of Qatar, as its logo. The aircraft livery includes the word Qatar in burgundy-coloured letters on a light grey background at both sides of the forward part of the fuselage, with the word in Arabic titles appearing close to it in a darker grey and a smaller typeface. A burgundy oryx in a grey background adorns the tailfin. The airline unveiled this branding in 2006.

=== Natural gas to liquid fuel demonstration ===
On October 12, 2009, a Qatar Airways Airbus A340-600 conducted the world's first commercial passenger flight using a mixture of kerosene and synthetic gas-to-liquids (GTL) fuel, produced from natural gas, on a flight from London Gatwick Airport to Doha. The experiment's purpose was to demonstrate the viability of jet fuel made from a source not subject to rapidly fluctuating oil prices. Also, positioning natural gas in particular as an alternative source of jet fuel is in the interests of the Qatari government; Qatar is the world's leading exporter of natural gas. However, some experts believe that GTL fuel is likely to remain a marginal choice due to an expensive production process.

=== Sponsorships ===
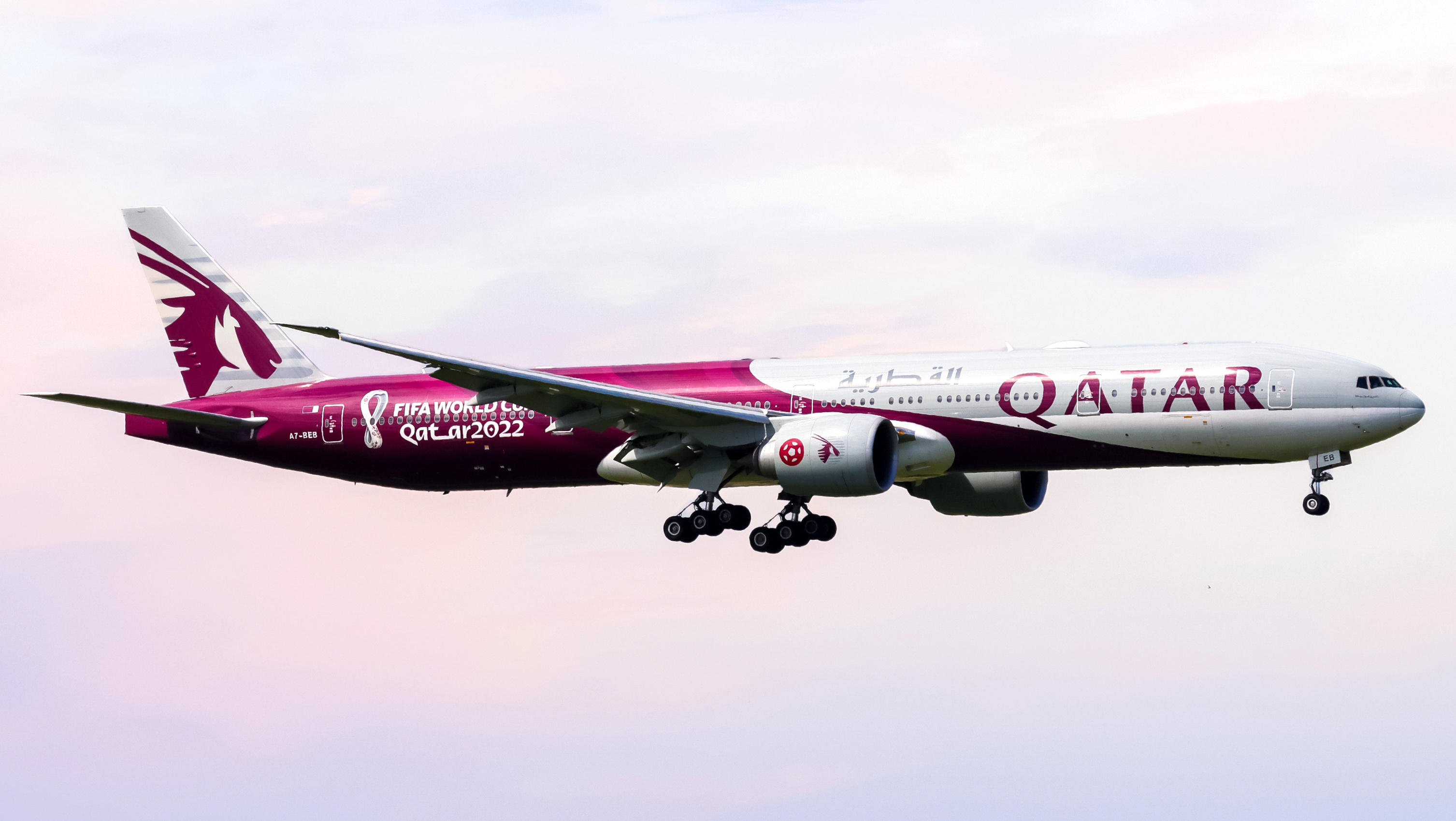
A Qatar Airways Boeing 777-300ER in 2022 FIFA World Cup special livery

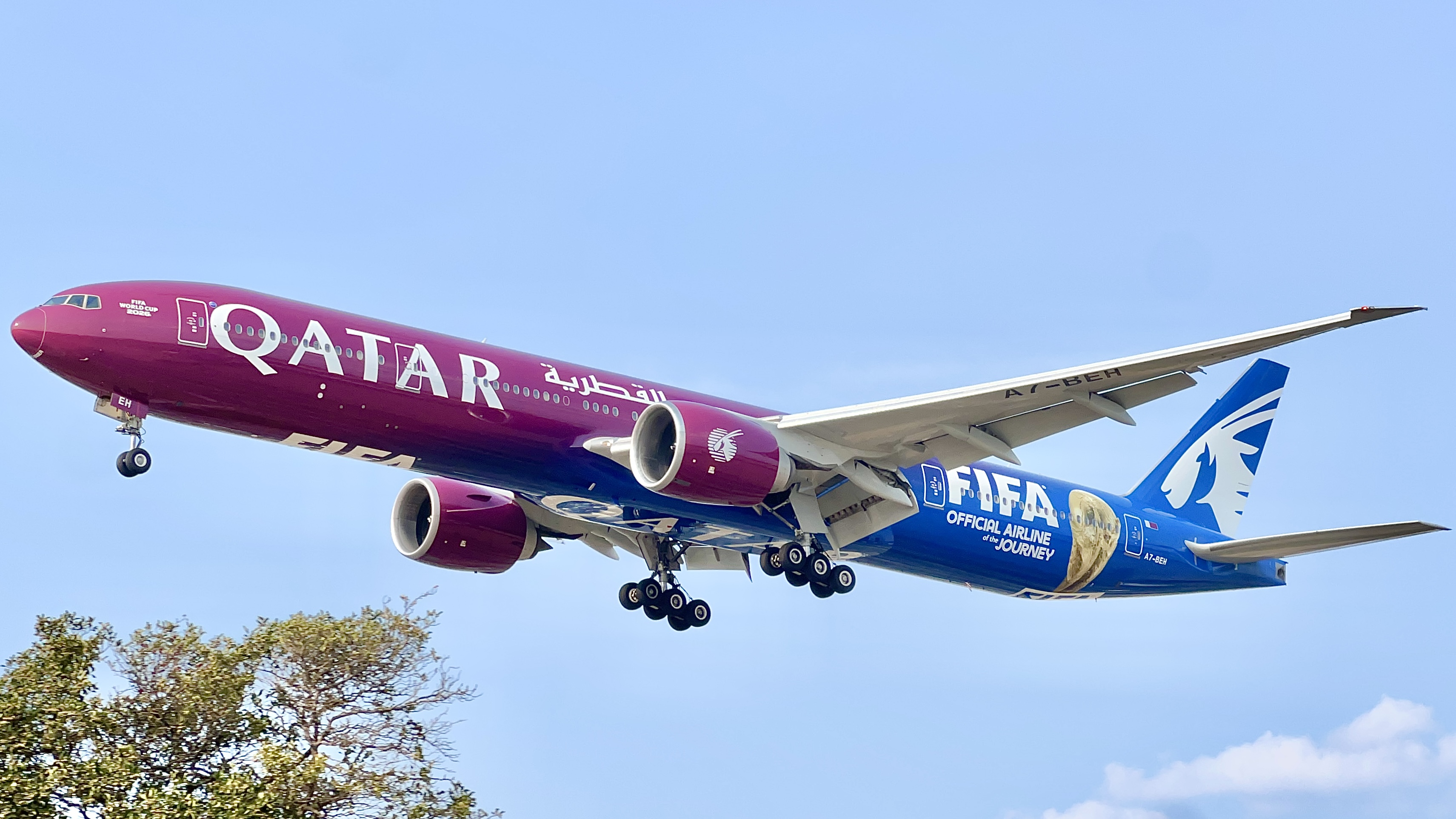
A Qatar Airways Boeing 777-300ER in 2026 FIFA World Cup special livery

- Qatar Airways has sponsored weather forecasts on Sky News since August 2005.
- In July 2013, Qatar Airways became FC Barcelona's primary shirt sponsor. This sponsorship ended in 2017.
- In August 2016, Qatar Airways became Official international Airline Sponsor for Sydney Swans.
- In May 2017 Qatar Airways became a FIFA Partner, sponsoring all FIFA tournaments until 2022 as part of a four-year deal. The deal was later extended to 2030.
- In May 2017, Qatar Airways became the "Official Airline Partner" for the FIA Formula E Championship for the Paris and New York City races.
- In February 2018, Qatar Airways became FC Bayern Munich's sleeve sponsor for domestic competitions starting in the 2018-19 season, but then extended to 2025 as part of the seven-year deal.
- In April 2018, Qatar Airways became A.S. Roma's primary shirt sponsor.
- In July 2018, Qatar Airways became Boca Juniors's primary shirt sponsor.
- In August 2018, Qatar Airways became a "prestige partner" and official airline sponsor for the 2018 Asian Games.
- In October 2018, Qatar Airways became the primary sponsor of the CONMEBOL club competitions for the South American market, part of the four-and-half year deal until the 2022 season.
- In November 2019, Qatar Airways became the title sponsor of the Philippines Football League.
- In February 2020, Qatar Airways became the premium partner for Paris Saint-Germain F.C. (PSG) for three seasons until 2022. On June 30, 2022, PSG extended their sponsorship with Qatar Airways for another three seasons until 2025 after taking over Accor on the first team, women's and youth team jerseys.
- In August 2020, Qatar Airways became the main shirt sponsor of Club Africain of Tunisia from the 2020/21 season until the 2022/23 season.
- In February 2021, Qatar Airways became the sponsor for the UEFA Euro 2020.
- In February 2021, Qatar Airways announced its commitment to fly wild animals back to where they belong through their WeQare program.
- In July 2021, Qatar Airways became the sponsor for the CONCACAF national team competitions starting in the 2021 CONCACAF Gold Cup and the 2022-23 CONCACAF Nations League for the Caribbean, Mexican and the North American markets, but then extended to 2024 after first signed in the 2017–20 cycle as part of the four-year deal.
- On August 24, 2022, it was announced that Qatar Airways would sponsor the Egyptian football club Al Ahly SC.
- On February 22, 2023, Formula One announced a partnership with Qatar Airways, replacing Emirates as the Global Airline Partner in a multi-year deal starting from the 2023 season. The partnership includes title sponsorship of three races in the 2023 season.
- On March 3, 2023, Royal Challengers Bangalore (RCB), the Bangalore franchise of the Indian Premier League (IPL), signed Qatar Airways as its title sponsor for three years in a ₹75 crore deal.
- In June 2023, Qatar Airways was announced as the official airline partner of United for Wildlife, a group that protects endangered species and works to stop the illegal wildlife trades.
- On September 8, 2023, Alpine F1 Team announced a partnership with Qatar Airways to become the Official Airline Partner. The deal was also for promoting together for the 2023 Qatar Grand Prix that runs from October 6–8, 2023.
- On November 13, 2023, Inter Milan announced a partnership with Qatar Airways to become the Official Airline Partner.
- On June 14, 2024, at the start of the UEFA Euro 2024, Qatar Airways expanded its sponsorship portfolio to become the official sponsor of the UEFA national team competitions including the UEFA Nations League and junior competitions.
- On September 19, 2024, at the start of the new-look UEFA Champions League season, Qatar Airways became the new airline sponsorship of the UEFA Champions League with a deal until 2030 after the success in an national team counterpart.

=== Investments ===
In 2015, the Qatar Airways purchased 9.99% of the International Airlines Group. Qatar has steadily increased its shareholding since then, and held 25.1% of the shares as of February 2020. In November 2017, the airline acquired roughly 10% of the stakes of Cathay Pacific; the participation was divested in 2026.

In December 2019, the company purchased a 60% stake in Rwanda's new $1.3 billion international airport, Bugesera International Airport. According to the memorandum of understanding signed between Qatar Airways and the Rwandan government "The partnership features three agreements to build, own, and operate the state-of-the-art facility." On June 1, 2026, Qatar Investment Authority announced that it had acquired Qatar Airways' 60% interest in New Kigali International Airport for $578 million and committed another $1.1 billion to complete the airport. Rwanda's ATL retains 40%.

In February 2020 Qatar Airways acquired a 49% stake in Rwanda's flag carrier airline RwandAir. According to reports, the partnership was to be beneficial for both airlines, as it would provide technical and financial support to RwandAir for its development and hub strategy, while Qatar Airways would be able to bypass the embargo imposed by neighbouring countries.

Qatar Airways also owns a 10% stake in the LATAM Airlines Group.

Qatar Airways and jetBlue are minority shareholders in JSX.

In 2024 Qatar Airways was announced as the Official Airline Partner and Official Cargo Airline Partner of MotoGP. As part of this new long-term collaboration, Qatar Airways is to offer passenger and cargo services for MotoGP™, which includes providing commercial tickets, charter flights for championship personnel, and freight services through Qatar Airways Cargo.

In February 2025 the Australian Government approved the sale of 25% of Virgin Australia Holdings, allowing for Virgin to start flights to Doha from Perth, Brisbane, Sydney and Melbourne. These flights will be operated by Qatar Airways 777-300ER aircraft through a wet-lease to Virgin, allowing Qatar to have access to 28 additional flights per week through a code-share arrangement.

In November 2025, Qatar Airways announced new global sports-related initiatives, including the launch of the "Qatar Airways United" youth development programme in partnership with former footballer Rio Ferdinand and a female-empowerment programme in collaboration with the BWT Alpine Formula One Team to promote access and opportunities for young people and women across football and motorsport.

== Destinations ==
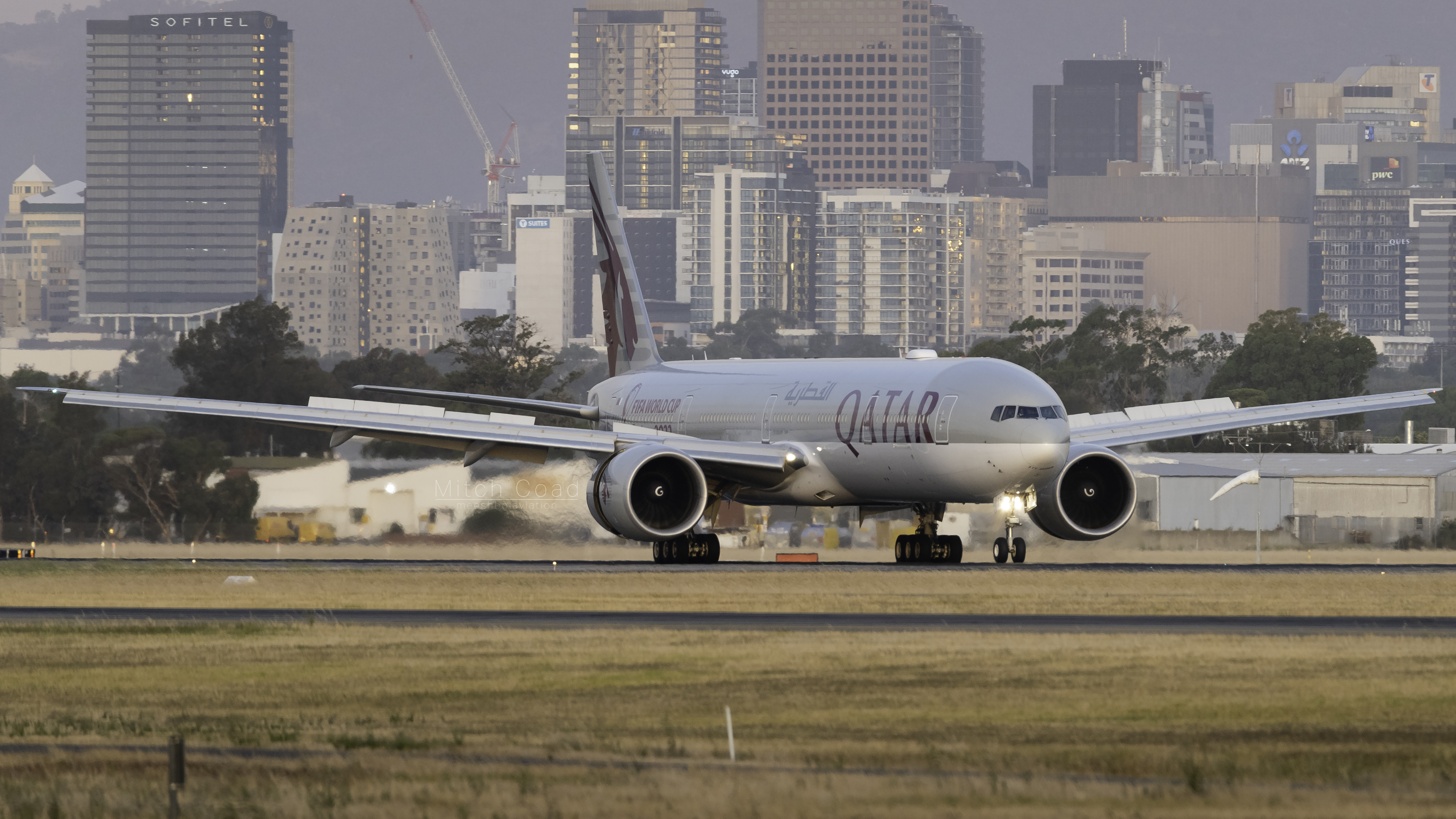
Qatar Airways Boeing 777-300ER at Adelaide Airport

Qatar Airways flies to over 90 countries on all six inhabited continents, including 13 destinations in India and 11 in the United States.

In 2012, fourteen more destinations were added to the Qatar Airways network: Addis Ababa, Baghdad, Belgrade, Erbil, Gassim, Kigali, Kilimanjaro, Maputo, Mombasa, Perth, Saint Petersburg, Warsaw, Yangon, and Zagreb.

On May 27, 2014, the touchdown of a flight from Bahrain at Doha's Hamad International Airport marked the official transfer of Qatar Airways' operations to its new hub, replacing Doha International Airport. As of December 2014, Qatar Airways served 146 points worldwide following the launch of flights to Asmara. The airline had previously added to the route network Dallas/Fort Worth, the carrier's seventh destination in the United States and its second in Texas along with Houston, Tokyo (Haneda), Miami, Edinburgh, its third destination in the United Kingdom, Istanbul's Sabiha Gökçen International Airport, its third point served in Turkey, and Djibouti. Starting June 2015, the carrier will serve Amsterdam. Starting December 2015, it was announced that the airline would serve Durban.

Qatar Airways began another route to Australia, with a non-stop service from Adelaide being launched in 2016. Introducing the Airbus A350 aircraft to Australia, the service was then operated by a Boeing 777-300ER.

In June 2017, all Qatar Airways flights were prevented from entering Emirati, Saudi Arabian, Bahrain and Egyptian airports due to the 2017 diplomatic crisis. All airlines in those countries had already suspended operations in Qatar's airspace and airports. This ban was in effect until January 2021, when it was lifted.

On June 18, 2019, Qatar Airways launched its first flight from Doha to Davao, Philippines.

On July 1, three months after announcing Doha-Mogadishu flights, Qatar Airways launched its first flight to Somalia.

In August 2019, the company introduced flights to Langkawi, as a part of its expansion plans in Southeast Asia. The route is Qatar Airways' third destination in Malaysia after Kuala Lumpur and Penang.

In September 2020, Qatar Airways suspended flights to both Birmingham Airport and Cardiff Airport due to low demand because of COVID-19 travel restrictions. Flights to Birmingham Airport and Cardiff Airport were scheduled to restart on March 28, 2021, however the flight to Birmingham was only restarted on the July 6, 2023, and the flight to Cardiff never restarted.

In January 2021, the embargo was lifted and Qatar Airways was again able to fly to countries such as Saudi Arabia, United Arab Emirates, Egypt and Bahrain and use their respective airspace.

As of January 25, 2021, Qatar Airways' network spreads across 120 destinations after the settlement of Qatar's airspace dispute with neighbouring Gulf countries. The carrier plans to expand its network to reach 130 routes by March 2021.

On July 24, 2021, Qatar Airways resumed service to Cebu after eight years of absence. Cebu, the second largest city in the Philippines, became the third destination in the country to be served by Qatar Airways.

On 1 September 2023, Qatar Airways re-introduced the route from Doha to Auckland with frequency of 7 times per week using its Airbus A350-1000 aircraft. The route is known to be the third longest non-stop direct flights in the world, at a distance of 9,032 air miles.

On January 7, 2025, following the tension ease in Syria, Qatar Airways resumed its schedule of three weekly flights to Damascus after 13 years of absence, helping Syria reconnect with major destinations in the region. Subsequently, Qatar Airways announced the resumption of operations to Malta beginning 2 July 2025, servicing the route with its fleet of Airbus A320 aircraft.

In March 2025, Qatar Airways announced that it is expanding its services to meet the anticipated summer travel surge by increasing flights to 11 global destinations. Starting October 27, the airline will operate eight daily flights to London Heathrow, totalling 56 weekly flights. Services to Male in the Maldives will increase from 13 to 28 weekly flights by late December. Additionally, beginning December 16, flights to Miami will rise to twelve weekly, and Tokyo will see eleven weekly flights.

=== Codeshare agreements ===
Qatar Airways has codeshare agreements with the following airlines and train systems:

- Aer Lingus
- Air Algerie
- Air Botswana
- Airlink
- Air Serbia
- Air Seychelles
- Alaska Airlines
- American Airlines
- Asiana Airlines
- Azerbaijan Airlines
- Bangkok Airways
- British Airways
- Bulgaria Air
- Cathay Pacific
- China Southern Airlines
- Deutsche Bahn (railway)
- Finnair
- Garuda Indonesia
- Gol Linhas Aéreas Inteligentes
- Hawaiian Airlines
- Iberia
- IndiGo
- Japan Airlines
- JetBlue
- Kenya Airways
- KM Malta Airlines
- LATAM Airlines
- LEVEL
- Malaysia Airlines
- Maldivian
- Middle East Airlines
- Oman Air
- Philippine Airlines
- Porter Airlines
- Royal Air Maroc
- Royal Jordanian
- RwandAir
- S7 Airlines
- SNCF (railway)
- SriLankan Airlines
- Virgin Australia
- Vueling
- WestJet
- XiamenAir

== Fleet ==
Qatar Airways operates a fleet of both narrow-body and widebody aircraft, using the Airbus A320, Airbus A350, Airbus A380, Boeing 737 MAX, Boeing 777 and Boeing 787 Dreamliner, totalling 230 aircraft.

== Cabin ==
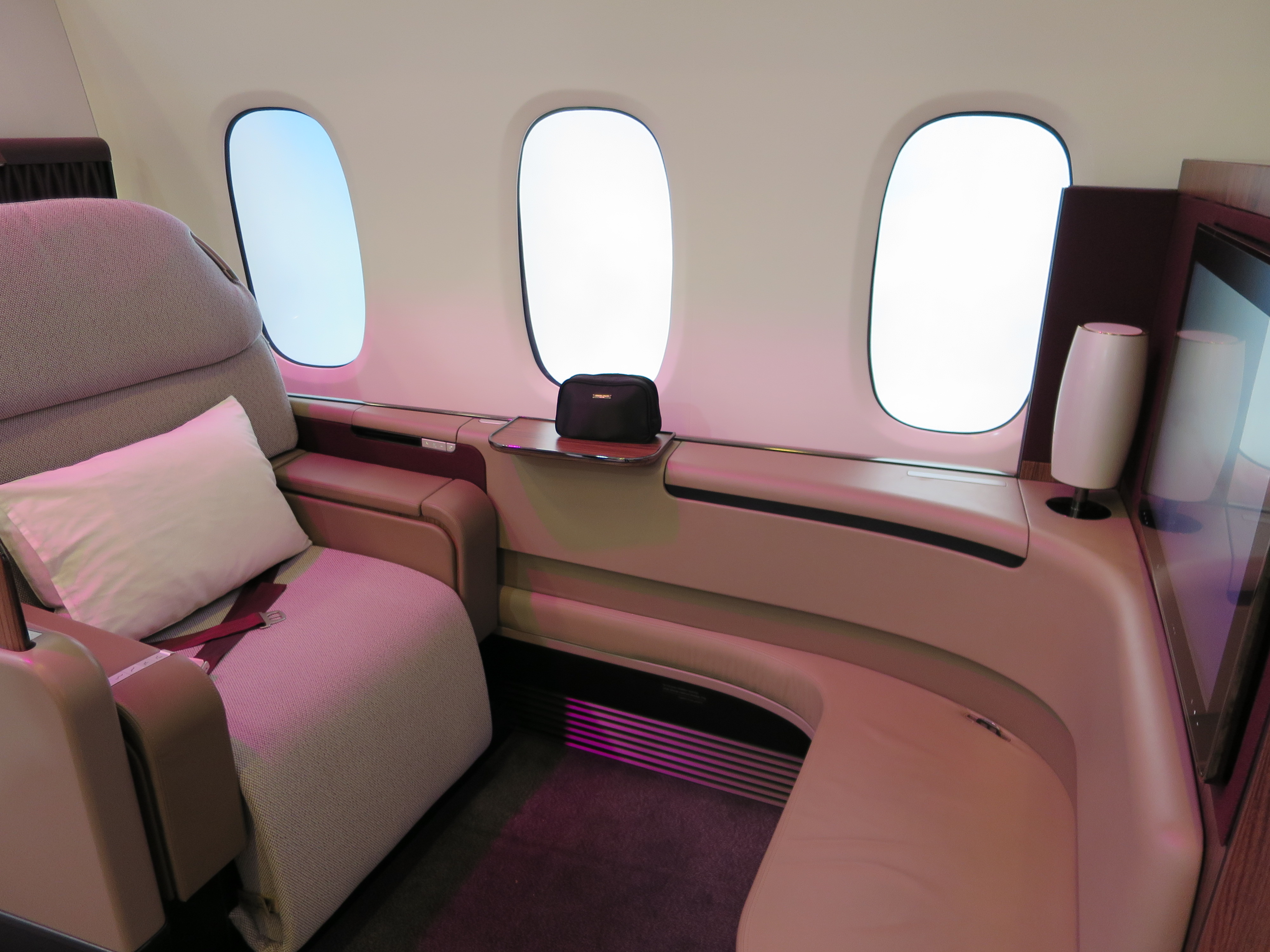
Qatar Airways' First Class Airbus A380 cabin mockup at ITB Berlin

=== First class ===
First class seats are equipped with massage functions and an entertainment system. The cabin is available only on A380s and features a 90-inch (230 cm) seat which can transform into a fully flat bed, alongside individual 26-inch television screens. The cabin is in a 1-2-1 configuration.

=== Business class ===
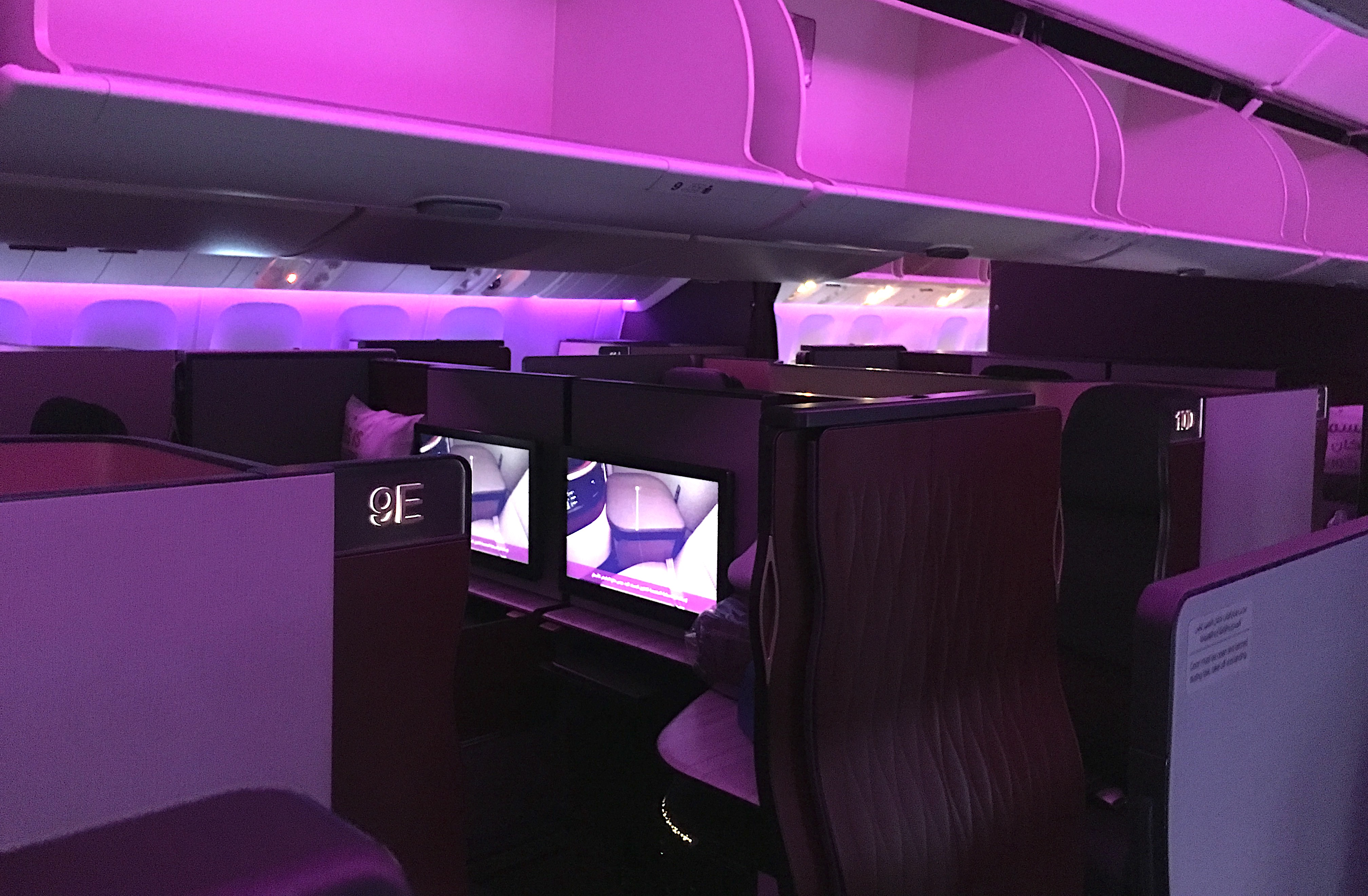
Qatar Airways' new business class product, the Qsuite, on a Boeing 777-300ER

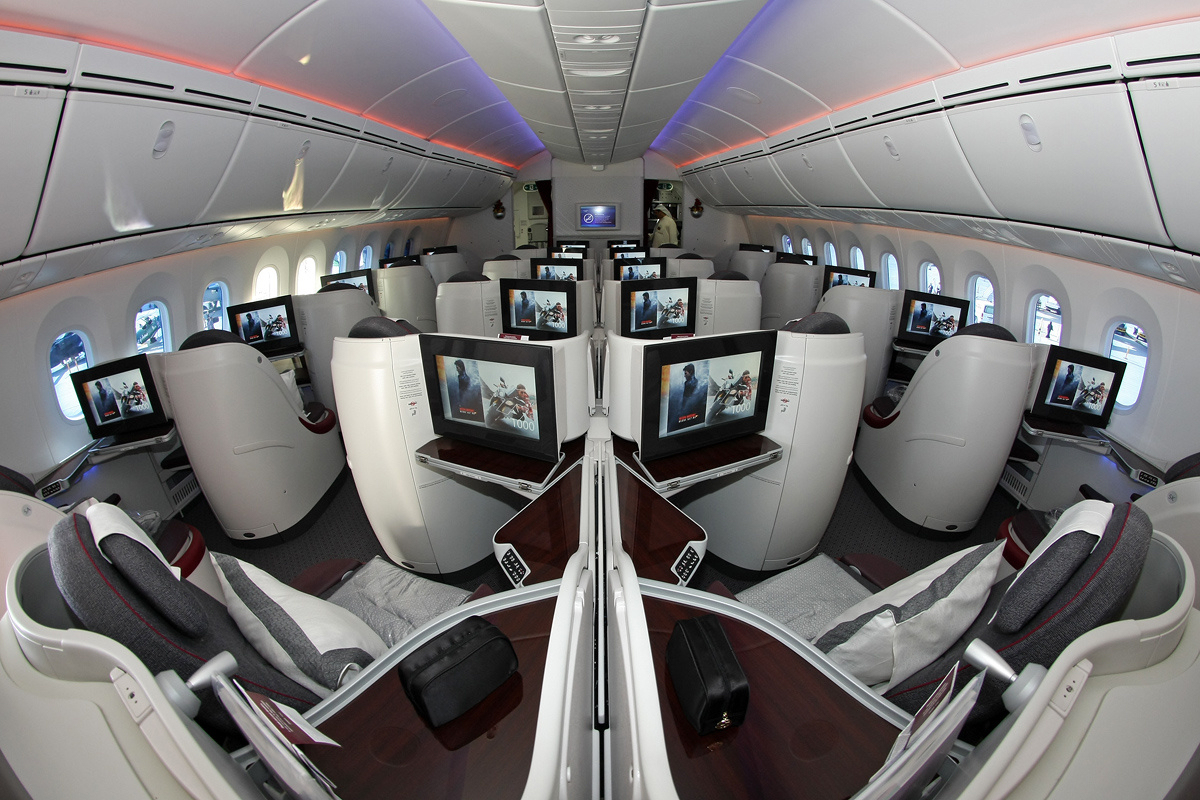
Qatar Airways' Boeing 787-8 Dreamliner Business Class cabin

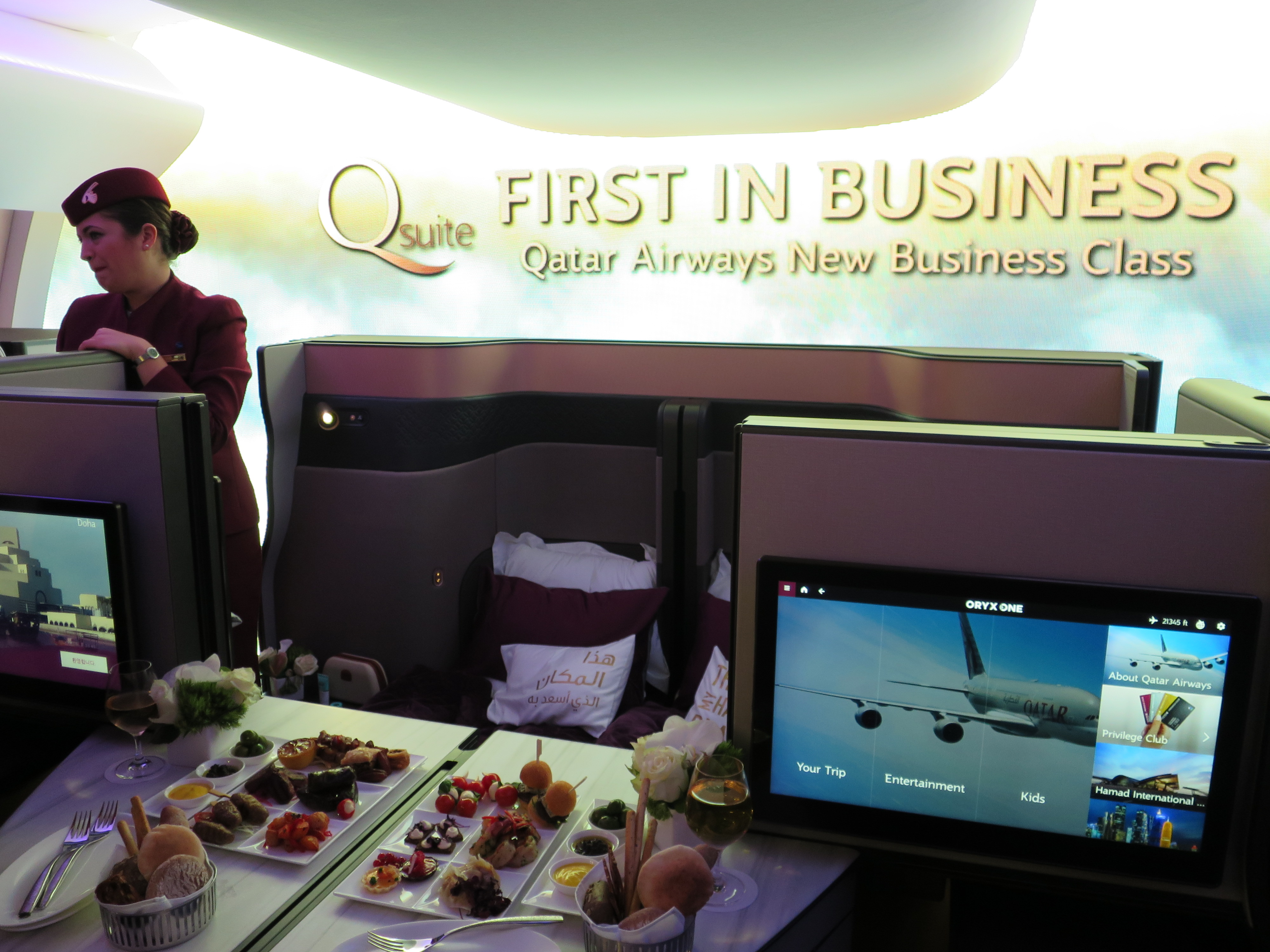
Qatar Airways Qsuite Business Class cabin

Qatar Airways offers business class passengers fully flat beds with direct aisle access in a 1-2-1 configuration on board its Airbus A380, Airbus A350, Boeing 777, and Boeing 787 aircraft. On other long and medium-haul aircraft, business class seats are in a 2-2-2 configuration offering flatbed seats with 180 degrees recline, with massage functions.

In March 2017, Qatar Airways revealed a new business class cabin, named "Qsuite." The new cabin offers suites with doors arranged in a 1-2-1 configuration. Qsuite features single seats on the window sides, and the middle section suites can be converted into a quad room, allowing four passengers to face each other in a dining-room like set up. Additionally, select "couple" seat pairs in the middle section can be converted into a double bed, offering a product similar to what other airlines offer in First Class. Launched on new Boeing 777-300ER and A350 XWB aircraft in summer 2017 and initially introduced on the Doha to London Heathrow route, the new seats will be retrofitted in the remaining fleet progressively, excluding the Airbus A330s and Airbus A380s due to their upcoming retirement of the types beginning in 2019 and 2024 as Qatar Airways introduced the Airbus A350, Boeing 787, and Boeing 777X to replace them.

=== Economy class ===
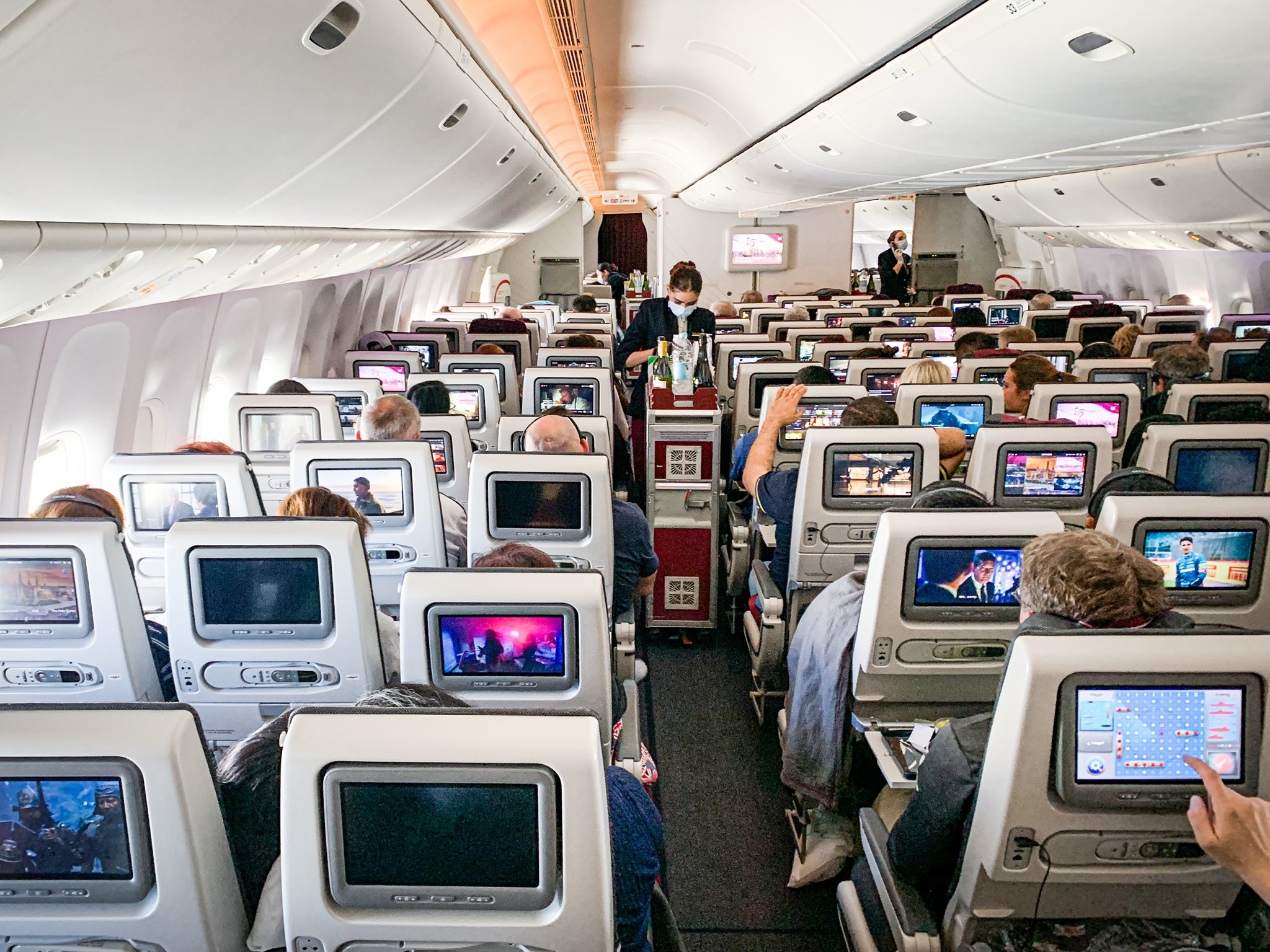
Economy Class seats (equipped with Oryx One in-flight entertainment screens) on a Boeing 777-300ER

Qatar Airways offers economy class passengers a seat pitch of up to 34 inches (86 cm). Economy class passengers on A330 aircraft are offered individual seat-back TV screens. Passengers on Airbus A350, A380, Boeing 777 and 787 aircraft are offered touch-screen IFE monitors.

Qatar Airways has taken delivery of several A320 family aircraft so far with individual seat-back personal televisions in every seat in economy class. The IFE is equipped with the same Thales entertainment system as used in the wide-body fleet. A further four A321s and the two A319LRs will be equipped with the new IFE, as well as new upcoming A320 family aircraft deliveries.

New economy seats were introduced with the launch of the 787. These new seats will be produced by Recaro and are fitted in a 3-3-3 configuration. 16.9 inches (43 cm) of width and a pitch of 32 inches (81 cm) will offer less personal space than before. Furthermore, each seat will have a 10.6-inch in-seat LED monitor offering in-flight entertainment. The features will also extend to the possibility of Wi-Fi and GSM telephony usage and USB ports for connecting personal items such as digital cameras.

=== In-flight entertainment ===
Qatar Airways' in-flight entertainment system is called Oryx One. Except some Airbus A320 and Boeing 737 Max family aircraft, all aircraft have personal seat-back entertainment screens. Some Airbus A320 family aircraft are fitted with main-screen entertainment. The airline is updating the Airbus A320 family aircraft to seat-back AVOD.

Qatar Airways also offers onboard Wi-Fi on all A380, A350, B777, B787, A319, and selected A320, A321, and A330 aircraft. Starlink Wi-Fi is available free of charge on the entire B777 fleet, with the technology also set to be rolled out onto the A350 fleet.

== Lounges ==
In 2015, Qatar Airways opened the Al Safwa First Lounge for its first-class passengers.

The airline's first lounge outside Doha opened at London Heathrow's Terminal 4 in January 2012 and Qatar Airways opened its new Premium Lounge at Dubai-International's Concourse D in April 2016. In January 2017, Qatar Airways opened its new premium lounge within Terminal 1 at Charles de Gaulle Airport. This marks the airline's third international lounge, following the successful openings in London Heathrow and Dubai.The lounge has a capacity for up to 200 passengers and includes two terraces, one of which is designated for smoking.

== Controversies ==
=== Treatment of employees ===
==== Pay ====
Qatar Airways’ average pay for its long-haul international crew is significantly less than that of its competitors, with airlines such as Australian-flag carrier Qantas paying its long-haul crew on average three times more of what Qatar Airways pay for similar distance routes. Qatar Airways employees are prohibited from campaigning for pay rises through industrial action and advocacy campaigns as trade union activity is effectively illegal for the vast majority of workers in the State of Qatar.

==== Working conditions ====
In 2014, the Swedish newspaper Expressen published a report ostensibly based around three Qatar Airways employees, whose lives were allegedly heavily "monitored" and "controlled" by the company. Qatar Airways' Swedish PR agency responded to the report by stating, "Because we do not know which individuals and which particular cases the article is based on, Qatar Airways is unable to comment". The CEO of Qatar Airways has denied the claims made in a Swedish newspaper regarding the alleged unfair treatment of its employees. He stated, "This is not directed at Qatar Airways, but rather at my home country. My country is being unfairly criticized and attacked without any justification."

In 2022, a Thomson Reuters Foundation report revealed that Qatar Airways crew are frequently exposed to dangerous, life-threatening working conditions, highlighting that most pilots and cabin crew collectively suffer burnout and fatigue from being overworked and underpaid, and are fearful of publicly and privately speaking out due to the risk of disciplinary action by Qatar Airways or criminal prosecution by the State of Qatar.

=== 2020 Doha Airport forced strip searches ===
On October 2, 2020, thirteen Australian female passengers aboard a Qatar Airways flight to Sydney from Hamad International Airport in Doha were forced to deplane before takeoff at gunpoint, and were subsequently strip searched and "subjected to an invasive internal examination" against their will. This was allegedly prompted by the discovery of a newborn baby in an airport bathroom. This evolved into a diplomatic incident between Australia and Qatar with the then-Australian foreign minister Marise Payne stating "the treatment of the women concerned was offensive, grossly inappropriate, and beyond circumstances in which the women could give free and informed consent".

In October 2022, the affected Australian women began legal proceedings in Australia against Qatar Airways and the Qatar Civil Aviation Authority under the Montreal convention.

In July 2023, the Australian Government rejected a request for Qatar Airways to double capacity into Sydney, Melbourne, Brisbane and Perth, with Australian Minister for Transport Catherine King stating that the 2020 incident was a 'factor' influencing the Australian Government's rejection of the bid.

In September 2023, Qatar Airways' senior vice president of global sales Matt Raos asserted that the 2020 incident was "a one-off and an isolated incident" during an Australian Senate inquiry.

In April 2024, the Federal Court of Australia dismissed the case, after finding that the searches did not happen onboard a Qatar Airways aircraft nor were carried out by the airline's employees. In 2025, however, the full bench of the Court reversed the April 2024 decision, allowing the case to proceed against Qatar Airways and Matar, the entity that runs Hamad International Airport.

Qatar strongly expressed its disapproval of the incident soon after it happened, with Qatari officials issuing an apology in 2020.

=== Hostilities with other Oneworld members ===
Since joining the Oneworld alliance in 2013, Qatar Airways has been involved in numerous high profile public disputes with fellow members of the alliance. Qatar Airways was engaged in a dispute with American Airlines from 2017 to 2020, and a different dispute with Qantas started in 2018 and continues to this date. In 2015 and 2019 Qatar Airways threatened to leave Oneworld, citing its relationship with American and Qantas, but never followed through on the threat. In 2023 the Australian government denied Qatar's request for 21 extra flights per week into Australia on grounds of "national interest", reportedly following lobbying by Qantas. It has been reported that in 2022 Qatar Airways almost succeeded in wielding its influence to kick Qantas out of the Oneworld alliance over the dispute, only to be eventually blocked through heavy involvement from American Airlines. In 2024 Qatar Airways purchased a 25% stake in Virgin Australia, bypassing the need for government approval of increased bilateral air rights and upping its competition against Qantas over the Australian market that way instead.

=== Possible involvement in the death of Marc Bennett ===
On September 29, 2022, The Times published an article about the death of British travel industry executive Marc Bennett in Qatar. On December 24, 2019, Bennett was found hanged in his hotel room in Doha. According to the investigation by The Times, Bennett was arrested and held in custody uncharged for three weeks after resigning from a senior post with Qatar Airways for a rival firm in Saudi Arabia. According to his family, he was both physically and mentally tortured while being held in custody, and after being released he was forbidden from leaving Qatar and his passport and belongings were confiscated by the authorities.

Qatar Airways told The Times, "On 15 October Marc left the business and evidence subsequently came to light showing that over a significant period Marc had emailed highly confidential documents relating to Qatar Airways to a private email address without authorization. Marc was still in Qatar at the point this discovery was made. He was arrested and this then became a police matter." However, Qatari authorities claimed that he had committed suicide and Qatar Airways stated, "Marc Bennett was a valued and popular former colleague of Qatar Airways group. He left with our best wishes."

=== European Union bribery cases ===
==== EU transport chief bribes ====
In November 2024, the European Public Prosecutor's Office (EPPO) initiated a criminal investigation into Henrik Hololei, a former EU transport chief, over allegations that he had accepted free flights from Qatar Airways while negotiating an Open Skies deal that favoured the airline. Reports indicated that Hololei traveled business class at no cost nine times from 2015 to 2021. Following a prior investigation by the European Anti-Fraud Office, the European Commission's disciplinary office has also been involved. Hololei resigned from his position as director general but remained a political advisor within the EU. In March 2025 the Commission decided to move from pre-disciplinary to full disciplinary proceedings, and in May of that year it has announced the launch of the proceedings. After the investigation concluded in January 2026, Hololei was fired from the European Commission, having been found to have breached the institution's rules with regards to "conflicts of interest, gift acceptance and disclosures".

==== EU–Qatar agreement on air transport ====
In December 2022, the European Parliament suspended Qatar's access following allegations that Qatari representatives offered substantial bribes to influence decisions, including a major and controversial air transit agreement that would have allowed Qatar Airways unlimited access to the EU market, leading to the arrest of several individuals, including MEP Eva Kaili. Subsequently, Lufthansa called for the suspension of the EU-Qatar air transport agreement, citing competitive disparities and the corruption allegations associated with its negotiation.

In February 2026, the European Commission's former transport head Henrik Hololei was fired for rules-breaking tied to receiving gifts from Doha, including from Qatar Airways, while negotiating the EU-Qatar air transport agreement. Following this, airlines, pilots and aviation worker unions petitioned the European Union to suspend and reassess the agreement. They argued that "Unrestricted market access to the European Union cannot be the product of compromised negotiations." The European Commission has consistently defended the deal and called it "transparent", and the commission's spokesperson for transport refused to react to the joint statement. Various signatories to the statement dispute these claims by the European Commission.

=== Sexist remarks by CEO Al Baker ===
Akbar Al Baker, Qatar Airways' CEO from 1996 to 2023, has made public remarks during his tenure that were described as sexist, and were seen by some as reflecting on the airline.

In July 2017, in a speech at a dinner in Ireland, he said that "the average age of my cabin crew is only 26 years", adding that on "crap American carriers ... you are always being served by grandmothers". The US Association of Flight Attendants (AFA) said that it was "disgusted but not surprised by Qatar Airways' attack on women", and that "if you prop up Qatar Airways, you are supporting sexism, racism, and ageism. Period." This incident took place during an ongoing dispute between US and Gulf carriers over claims by the former that the latter were violating aviation agreements by accepting massive state subsidies. Al Baker later wrote an apology letter to the AFA. Sara Nelson, the association's president, wrote back in response: "As a leader in the aviation industry, you know that your words carry weight and should be taken at face value. I accept your apology."

In June 2018, speaking at a press conference following his election to chairman of the International Air Transport Association, Al Baker said that he did not believe that a woman could lead Qatar Airways, "because it is a very challenging position". Although Al-Baker later apologized, he stopped short of recanting his belief that being CEO of an international airline is too challenging a job for a woman. He said that he was attempting to make a joke at the time.

== Accidents ==
- April 19, 2007: An Airbus A300, registration A7-ABV, was written off as a result of a hangar fire during maintenance at Abu Dhabi Aircraft Technologies.
- December 8, 2017: An Airbus A321, with registration A7-AIB was damaged beyond economic repair by a fire during maintenance at Hamad International Airport, Doha.

== See also ==
- Transport in Qatar
