= John Friend =

John Friend may refer to:

- John Friend (conspirator) (died 1696), English conspirator
- John Albert Newton Friend (1881–1966), British chemist
- John Friend (footballer) (born 1953), Australian rules footballer
- John Friend (yogi) (born 1959), founder of Anusara Yoga, born Clifford Friend
- the title character of The Infamous John Friend, a 1909 novel and 1959 BBC television miniseries adaptation

== See also ==
- John Freind (disambiguation)
