= Qatar Executive =

Qatari charter operator

Qatar Executive القطرية
IATA	ICAO	Call sign
QE	QQE	QREX
- Founded: June 16, 2009; 17 years ago
- Hubs: Doha International Airport
- Fleet size: 27
- Destinations: As of demand
- Parent company: Qatar Airways
- Headquarters: Doha, Qatar
- Key people: Mr. Hamad Ali Al-Khater (CEO)
- Website: www.qatarexec.com.qa

Qatar Executive (Arabic: القطرية لطائرات رجال الأعمال) is a Qatari private aviation company and business jet operator, operating a wholly owned fleet of long and ultra-long-range business jets tailored for worldwide private charter and bespoke aviation services, including aircraft management and fixed-base operator (FBO) services.

Established on June 16, 2009, at the Paris Air Show, Qatar Executive operates as part of the Qatar Airways Group while delivering private aviation services distinct from the group’s commercial airline operations.

In addition to charter operations, Qatar Executive offers aircraft management, maintenance and FBO services at Doha International Airport. In March 2012, Bombardier appointed Qatar Executive as an Authorized Service Facility for Challenger and Global aircraft in the Middle East.

== Fleet ==
As of May 2026, Qatar Executive operates a wholly owned fleet of long-range and ultra-long range business jets dedicated to worldwide private charter services. The company operates under a floating fleet model, with aircraft repositioned globally according to demand, enabling flexible international operations while minimising unnecessary repositioning flights.

Qatar Executive fleet
Aircraft	Number in service
Gulfstream G700	10
Gulfstream G650ER	15
Bombardier Global 5000	2
Airbus A319CJ	1
Total	27

== Inflight Connectivity ==
In December 2025, Qatar Executive confirmed that Starlink Satellite internet connectivity was being installed across its entire business jet fleet, with the full fleet-wide availability achieved by early 2026.
