= John Freind =

John Freind may refer to:

- Sir John Freind (conspirator) or John Friend (died 1696), English civil servant; executed
- John Freind (physician) (1675–1728), English physician
- Sir John Freind Robinson, 1st Baronet (1754–1832) English Archdeacon of Armagh

== See also ==
- John Friend (disambiguation)
