= Veda Shook =

American labor leader

- Occupations: Labor leader, flight attendant

Veda Shook is the former International President of the Association of Flight Attendants-CWA, AFL-CIO. An Alaska Airlines flight attendant since 1991, she previously served as AFA's International Vice President for a term beginning January 1, 2007. Today, AFA-CWA represents nearly 60,000 flight attendants at 23 airlines. She was one of the 53 members of the Executive Council of the AFL-CIO.

== Early career ==
Shook has been a flight attendant with Alaska Airlines since June 7, 1991. Soon after beginning her career, Veda organized with fellow Portland Flight Attendants to gain local status within the union for the Portland flight attendant base and became the local president of AFA's Portland council. She organized the Volunteer Organizers for Information, Communication and Education (VOICE) committee, and employed the VOICE committee.

== Organizing ==
Shook was recruited to help with AFA’s organizing campaign at Delta Air Lines even before she became president of the Alaska MEC. As a union organizer, she coordinated efforts in western domiciles during AFA’s first Delta campaign. Until she was elected International President in April 2010, Veda directed the union’s efforts in the campaign to organize Delta’s Flight Attendants. While serving as International Vice President, Veda took part in the organizing drives for the flight attendants at Lynx Air International, USA3000, Ryan International and Compass Airlines. As of June 2014, Veda's successor as International President is Sara Nelson AFA, the pioneer of AFA's CHAOS strike program.

Shook served as a member of the Finance, Legislation/Policy, and Women Workers Committees of the AFL-CIO, and served as chair of the Committee on Ethical Practices.

== International Office ==
As International Vice President, in addition to her organizing work, she directed AFA’s leadership development, organizational development and internal organizing in support of contract campaigns and legislative battles. Shook also testified regularly before the United States Congress on issues of importance to flight attendants.

As International President, Shook was the top officer of AFA, responsible for the overall leadership and direction of the union. She served as chair of the union's annual convention, the AFA Board of Directors, as well as the union's Executive Board. She was the chief spokesperson for the union, and the primary liaison with other unions and labor organizations, airlines, industry groups and governmental agencies.

As International President, Shook was succeeded by Sara Nelson AFA in June 2014.

== Education ==
Shook graduated from the University of Colorado Boulder in 1991 with a bachelor's degree in International Relations, and fluency in French.

== Personal life ==
Shook is married and has two children.

Trade union offices
Preceded by Patricia A. Friend	President of the Association of Flight Attendants; 2010–2014	Succeeded by Sara Nelson
