= Hilderic Friend =

Rev. Hilderic Friend FLS.
- Born: 6 November 1852; High Wigsell, East Sussex, England
- Died: 7 February 1940 (aged 87); Birmingham
- Occupations: Wesleyan minister; naturalist
- Children: J. A. Newton Friend

Hilderic Friend was an English Wesleyan minister and naturalist. He is widely known for his book Flowers and Flower Lore.

== Biography ==
Hilderic Friend was born 6 November 1852 at High Wigsell (East Sussex). He spent his early years in the vicinity of Hastings. In 1874 he entered the College at Richmond. Two years later he sailed as a missionary to China. Because of his health he returned home in 1880.

With the view to recuperation he served in circuits in rural places. The first was Newton Abbott in Devonshire. Here he could spend much time in the open air. He started practising field botany. In 1882 he wrote A Glossary of Devonshire Plant Names. One year later his Flowers and Flower Lore was published.

In later years Friend travelled all over the country. Around 1895, for instance, he was allotted the Cockermouth circuit for three years.

He retired in 1914.

Friend died 7 February 1940.

== Worms ==
Hilderic Friend became interested in worms, and especially since his retirement he devoted much time to the study of the Annelids. He discovered many new species.

== Bibliography ==
Some of the written publications of Hilderic Friend are:

- Friend, Hilderic (1882). A Glossary of Devonshire Plant Names. London: Published for the English Dialect Society by Trübner & Co. OCLC 3315356.
- —— (1883). Flowers and Flower Lore. London: W. Swan Sonnenschein. OCLC 906518886. OL 129490W.

=== Journal publications ===
Hilderic Friend published a large number of articles in journals. Among his publications are:

- Friend, Hilderic (1899). New British Annelids . The Zoologist, 4th series, vol. 3, issue 696 (June, 1899), pp. 262-265 – via Wikisource.
