= Henrik Hololei =

Estonian civil servant and former politician (born 1970)

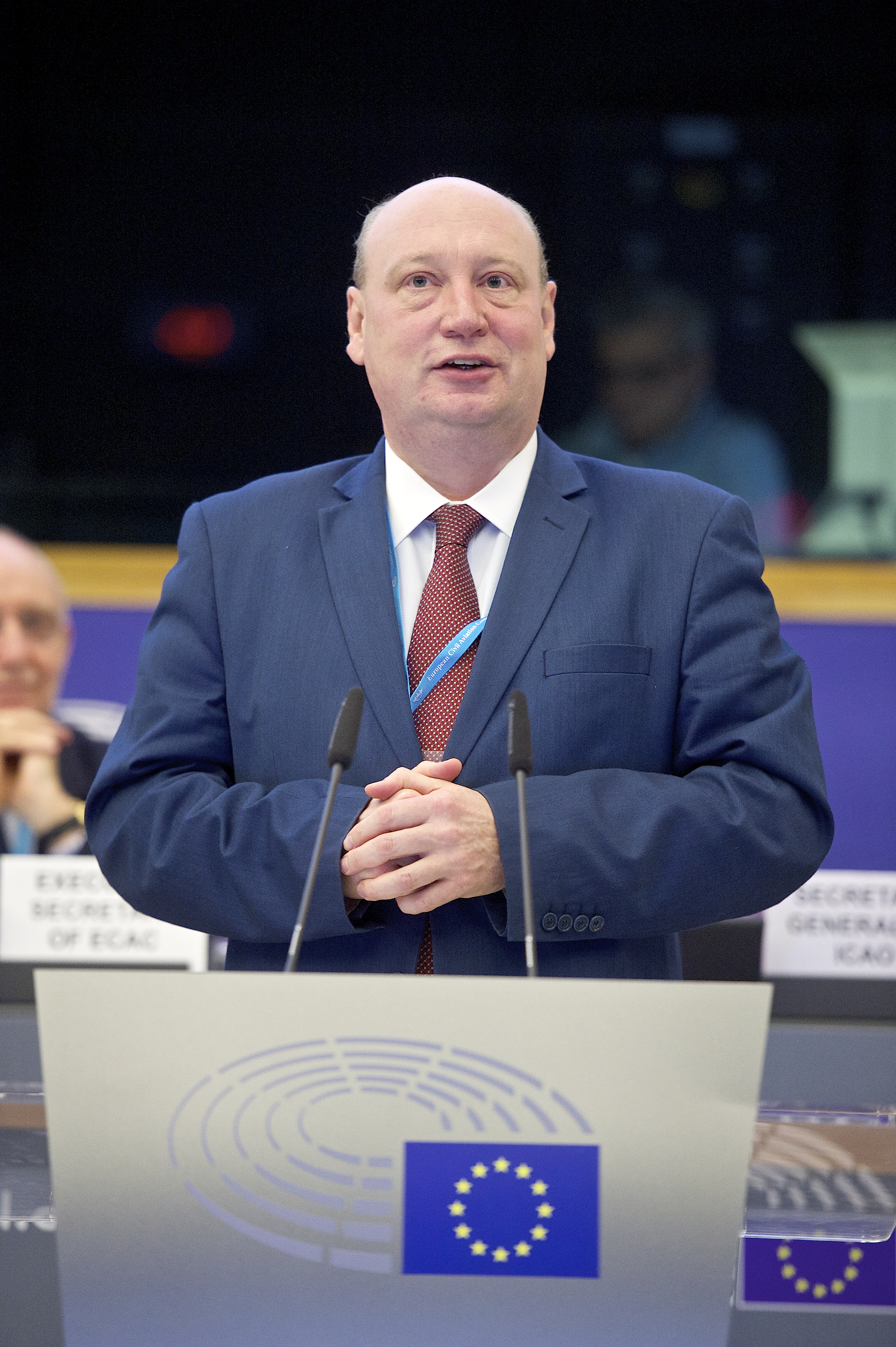
- Hololei in 2018

Director-General for Mobility and Transport (European Commission)
- In office October 2015 – March 2023
- Preceded by: João Aguiar Machado
- Succeeded by: Magda Kopczyńska

Minister of Economic Affairs
- In office 15 October 2001 – 28 January 2002
- Prime Minister: Mart Laar
- Preceded by: Mihkel Pärnoja
- Succeeded by: Liina Tõnisson

Personal details
- Born: 1 April 1970 Tallinn, then part of Estonian SSR, Soviet Union
- Party: Independent (since 2024)
- Other political affiliations: Parempoolsed (2022–2024); Isamaa (2004–2022); Moderates (1998–2004)
- Education: Tallinn University of Technology
- Occupation: Civil servant, politician

Henrik Hololei (born 1 April 1970) is an Estonian civil servant and former politician. He served as director-general for mobility and transport of the European Commission (DG MOVE) from 2015 to 2023, then as a senior adviser (hors classe) in the commission's Directorate-General for International Partnerships (DG INTPA). He previously served as Estonia's minister of economic affairs in the second cabinet led by Mart Laar.

Following revelations in the press in 2023 and 2024 about gifts received from the Qatar while a transport deal was being negotiated with the country, investigations were opened against Hololei by various European bodies, including the European Commission itself. In January 2026, he was fired from the European Commission after he was found to have breached the institution's rules with regards to "conflicts of interest, gift acceptance and disclosures".

== Early life and education ==
Hololei was born in Tallinn. He graduated in economics from the Tallinn University of Technology and undertook additional studies at Aarhus University.

== Career ==
=== Estonia ===
Hololei worked in Estonia's public sector and EU-accession structures during the 1990s and early 2000s, including in the Estonian Government Office's European integration structures.

From 15 October 2001, he served as Minister of Economic Affairs in Mart Laar's government, which was in office until 28 January 2002.

=== European Commission ===
Hololei joined the European Commission following Estonia's accession to the European Union in 2004 and held several senior posts, including head of Cabinet to Commissioner Siim Kallas. He later served as Deputy Secretary-general of the European Commission (2013–2015).

In October 2015, Hololei became director-general for mobility and transport (DG MOVE). In April 2023, following allegations of receiving gifts from the State of Qatar during negotiations for a transport deal, he resigned from his position as the head of DG MOVE, but stayed in the Commission, becoming a special adviser in its international partnership division (DG INTPA).

Hololei was succeeded as director-general of DG MOVE by Magda Kopczyńska (in post from 1 August 2023).

In January 2026, after years of investigations, Hololei was fired from the European Commission for having breached the institution's rules in relation to the Qatari affair.

== Qatari gifts controversy ==
In early 2023, Politico reported that Hololei had taken multiple business-class trips on Qatar Airways between 2015 and 2021 without paying, while DG MOVE was involved in negotiating an EU–Qatar air transport agreement signed in October 2021. Reuters reported that the European Ombudsman sought clarification from the commission about the authorisation and oversight of such travel, noting the risk that the public would not distinguish between a director-general and negotiating staff.

The European Commission subsequently tightened its rules on travel paid for by third parties, citing the need to prevent conflicts of interest and perceptions of undue influence. In March 2023, Hololei was transferred from DG MOVE to an adviser post in DG INTPA, effective 1 April 2023, according to Euronews reporting on Commission statements.

In 2024, following reporting by French newspaper Libération about supposed exchanges of confidential information on the Qatar aviation deal in exchange for Qatari gifts for himself and others, the EU's Anti-Fraud Office (OLAF) opened a probe, and the European Public Prosecutor's Office (EPPO) opened a criminal investigation. Estonian paper ERR also reported that Hololei denied wrongdoing.

In May 2025, the European Commission also opened an internal disciplinary investigation in connection with alleged breaches of conflict-of-interest and transparency rules, citing documents described by Politico.

In January 2026, after years of investigations, Hololei was fired by the European Commission. According to Politico, three officials with knowledge of the investigation have said that it was determined that Hololei had "breached the EU institution's rules", citing rules concerning "conflicts of interest, gift acceptance and disclosures".

== Political affiliations ==
According to Estonia's e-Business Register political party membership history, Hololei was a member of the People's Party Moderates (1998–2004), Res Publica/Isamaa (2004–2022), and The Right (Parempoolsed) from October 2022 until November 2024.

== Honours ==
Hololei's official CV lists state decorations from Estonia, Finland, France, and Latvia.
