= Association of Flight Attendants =

American labor union

AFA-CWA
- Association of Flight Attendants-CWA
- Founded: August 22, 1945
- Headquarters: Washington, D.C.
- Location: United States
- Members: 45,377
- Key people: Sara Nelson, Int'l President; Keturah Johnson, Int'l Vice President; Dante Harris, Int'l Secretary-Treasurer
- Affiliations: AFL–CIO; CWA; ITF; TUC
- Website: www.afacwa.org

The Association of Flight Attendants-CWA (commonly known as AFA) is a union representing flight attendants in the United States. As of January 2018, AFA represents 50,000 flight attendants at 20 airlines. Since 2004, AFA has been part of the Communications Workers of America (CWA), an affiliate of AFL–CIO. AFA is also an affiliate of the International Transport Workers' Federation.

== History ==
Efforts to unionize flight attendants began prior to the 1940s but were often met with resistance, including intimidation and dismissals of organizers. In 1944, Ada Brown and four other flight attendants founded the Airline Stewardess Association (ALSA), later a precursor to the Association of Flight Attendants. Unlike earlier attempts, ALSA faced no opposition from United Airlines, which opted to work with the new union. ALSA was officially established on August 22, 1945.

The Airline Pilots Association (ALPA) played an early supportive role, providing information and materials to ALSA. However, tensions soon emerged between the two groups. ALPA had plans to unionize airline employees more broadly, and ALSA’s independent efforts were seen as a challenge to that goal. Negotiations between ALSA and United Airlines began in December 1945, with Ada Brown, Frances Hall, and Sally Thometz representing the union. The talks continued into 1946 and were financially supported by small individual donations. ALSA signed its first contract with United on April 25, 1946.

The contract introduced limits on working hours, capping flight time at 85 hours per month and 255 hours over three months. It also raised starting salaries from $125 to $155. Talks of union consolidation followed, and on December 2, 1949, ALSA merged with the Air Line Stewards and Stewardesses Association (ALSSA), an affiliate of ALPA. By 1951, ALSSA had grown to 3,300 members.

ALPA created two separate divisions in 1960, one for pilots, and one for stewards and stewardesses. Nearly half of the USA's 8,700 flight attendants were members of ALPA's S&S division at that time. Discussions about autonomy for the S & S division of the ALPA kicked up during the 1970s. A vote for autonomy was conducted in June 1973 however the necessary favorable votes (2/3rds) were not reached. A second vote was conducted in October 1973 and a similar outcome was reached. Later that year S & S Division formed the independent Association of Flight Attendants, leaving ALPA.

In 1973, ALSSA flight attendants chose self-determination and formed the independent Association of Flight Attendants, leaving ALPA.

In 1982, AFA had 22,000 members at 18 American airlines. In 1984, the AFL–CIO granted AFA a charter.

In 2004, after the September 11th attacks, the AFA merged with the Communication Workers of America.

== Organizing ==
In July 2006, Northwest Airlines flight attendants voted to replace their independent union with AFA. AFA's membership rose to 55,000 flight attendants. On November 4, 2010, AFA was decertified by the National Mediation Board as the bargaining representative for the pre-merger Northwest Airlines flight attendants of Delta Air Lines, after narrowly losing a representational election of the combined group the day before. AFA filed objections to the election with the National Mediation Board alleging interference.

On June 29, 2011, AFA won one of the largest private sector union elections in decades, winning representation rights for the combined workforce of approximately 24,000 flight attendants at United Airlines, Continental Airlines and Continental Micronesia. That election was triggered by a National Mediation Board ruling that those airlines had formed a single transportation system as a result of a corporate merger.

== CHAOS ==
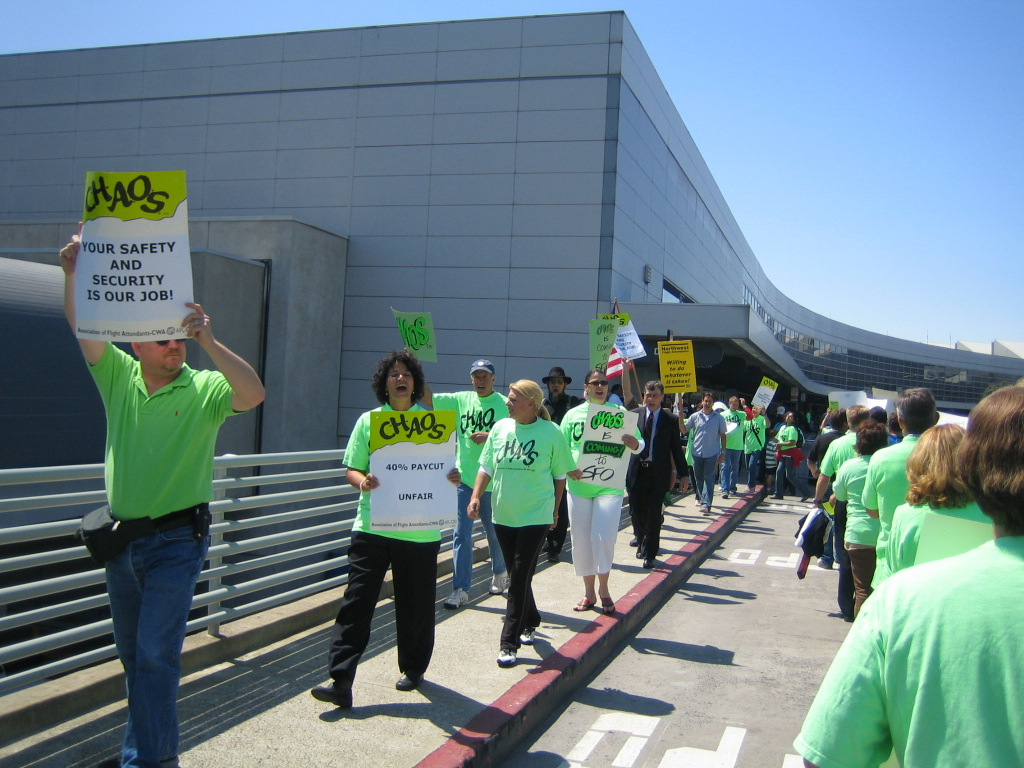
AFA-CWA members threaten CHAOS at Northwest Airlines August 15, 2006 at San Francisco International Airport

CHAOS is AFA's trademarked strategy of intermittent strikes designed to maximize the impact of an industrial action while minimizing the risk for striking flight attendants.

In May 1993, AFA members at Seattle-based Alaska Airlines were facing a 30-day cooling-off period after more than three years of negotiations. In June, 1993, the cooling-off period mandated by the Railway Labor Act had expired. The first CHAOS strike took place in Seattle when three flight attendants walked off an Alaska Airlines flight just before passenger boarding. A month later, another crew of flight attendants struck the last flight out of Las Vegas. A few weeks later, AFA struck five flights simultaneously in the San Francisco area.

America West, AirTran and US Airways all settled with AFA on the eve of, or a few minutes after, the end of a 30-day cooling-off period in the 1990s. AFA flight attendants at Midwest Express (now Midwest Airlines), completed a cooling-off period without reaching agreement on a first contract in 2002. After three weeks of a CHAOS campaign, and on the eve of CHAOS strikes, management agreed to terms that were ratified by the flight attendants. United Airlines flight attendants used the threat of CHAOS to leverage their negotiations during the airline's bankruptcy, succeeding in doubling the value of the replacement retirement plan management had proposed.

Flight attendants at Northwest Airlines, locked in a round of bankruptcy negotiations, deployed a CHAOS campaign days after joining AFA in July, 2006. Union negotiators concluded a new tentative agreement with millions of dollars in improvements, but which was voted down by a narrow margin. AFA continued preparations for CHAOS strikes at Northwest pending the outcome of negotiations and litigation surrounding the case.

The bankruptcy court ruled in favor of the union, denying the strike injunction sought by management. On appeal, the federal district court and the court of appeals ruled that workers under the Railway Labor Act cannot strike in response to rejection of a collective bargaining agreement in bankruptcy. Northwest and AFA returned to negotiations and reached a new tentative agreement, which was narrowly ratified by the flight attendants on May 29, 2007. The flight attendants became the last major work group at Northwest to agree to new contract terms in bankruptcy. The new contract provided Northwest with $195 million in annual cuts through 2011, and secured a $182 million equity claim for the flight attendants before it was lost upon the company's exit from bankruptcy.

On August 16, 2023, Alaska Airlines flight attendants protested across the US for better wages and working conditions. Across the US, it has been estimated that over 1,000 flight attendants were in attention outside of airports demanding a higher pay. In September flight attendants a part of the union voted for a new contract with a 99.47% approval rating.

On August 28, 2024, AFA members at United Airlines voted with 99.99% approval to authorize a labor strike, with 90.21% members participating. However, no strike was immediately called, with negotiations between AFA and United continuing.

== Member flight attendant groups ==
AFA represents the flight attendants at the following airlines:

- Air Wisconsin Airlines
- Alaska Airlines
- Air Transport International
- Avelo Airlines
- Breeze Airways
- Eastern Airlines
- Endeavor Air
- Envoy Air
- Frontier Airlines
- GoJet Airlines
- Hawaiian Airlines
- Horizon Air
- Mesa Airlines
- Norse Atlantic Airways
- Omni Air International
- Piedmont Airlines
- PSA Airlines
- Spirit Airlines
- United Airlines

== Presidents ==
- 1945: Ada Brown
- 1947: Frances Hall
- 1948: Irene Eastin
- 1951: Mary Alice Koos
- 1953 Rowland K. Quinn Jr
- 1973: Kelly Rueck
- 1979: Linda Puchala
- 1986: Susan Bianchi-Sand
- 1991: Dee Maki
- 1995: Patricia A. Friend
- 2010: Veda Shook
- 2014: Sara Nelson

== See also ==
- Communications Workers of America

== Citations ==
=== Works cited ===
- Nielsen, Georgia Panter (1982). From Skygirl to Flight Attendant, Women and the Making of a Union. Ithaca, New York: ILR Press/Cornell. ISBN 978-0-87546-093-2.
- Borer, David A. (1995). "Doing Battle: Flight Attendant Labor Relations in '90s". In Darryl Jenkins (ed.). Handbook of Airline Economics. Aviation Week Grp., Div. of McGraw-Hill. pp. 563–568. ISBN 0-07-607087-5.
