= Patricia A. Friend =

- Occupation(s): Labor leader, flight attendant

Patricia A. Friend is the former International President of the Association of Flight Attendants-CWA, AFL-CIO. A United Airlines flight attendant since 1966, during her 16 years as International President, Friend was a respected leader in the airline industry and throughout the labor movement.

Following the September 11 terrorist attacks, Friend was appointed by U.S. Secretary of Transportation Norman Mineta to serve on the DOT Rapid Response Team for Aircraft Security, a group of industry experts assembled to recommend aircraft security improvements. Since then, she has tirelessly lobbied Congress, the Federal Aviation Administration and the public for their support of more stringent security measures and financial relief for displaced workers.

Under Friend's leadership, AFA-CWA has fought for and won whistleblower protections for aviation employees, increased penalties for crew interference, a smoking ban on international flights, and opened the door for occupational safety and health protections for all flight attendants.

Elected to her first four-year term as International President, Friend assumed leadership of AFA-CWA in January 1995. She began her fourth term as International President on January 1, 2007.

Friend's ability to represent AFA-CWA's diverse group of working women and men stemmed from her 37 years of flying and vast experience in all aspects of union business. Today, AFA-CWA represents 42,000 flight attendants at 21 airlines, making it the largest flight attendant union in the world.

As a result of the merger between AFA-CWA and the Communications Workers of America (CWA), Friend served as a CWA Vice President. In that capacity, she was a member of several CWA Executive Board committees, including Education, Legislative, Political, Health and Safety and the New Economy Workers Committee.

In addition to her role as AFA-CWA's President, Friend is one of eight women on the 46-member AFL-CIO Executive Council. As an AFL-CIO Council member, she presides as Chair of the Public Affairs Committee. She also serves as a member of the Financial Oversight Committee of the Transportation Trades Department as well as serving as the department's Secretary-Treasurer. In addition, she serves on a number of other AFL-CIO committees, including Legislative/Public Policy, Women Workers, Organizing, Strategic Approaches, International Affairs, Subcommittee on Independent Union Raiding, Appeals Committee, and the Committee on Ethical Practices, Committee on Finance. She is also a member of the Board of Directors for Working America, a community affiliate of the AFL-CIO. Most recently, Friend has been appointed by the AFL-CIO President to serve on the Board for the National Endowment for Democracy.

On the international level, Friend promoted the interests of the flight attendants by her participation on various committees of the International Transport Workers' Federation (ITF), which represents more than 5 million transport workers. She is the Chair of the Cabin Crew Committee, the representative to the ITF ICAO cabin safety training manual working group, plays an active role on the Women's Committee and is the women's representative on the North American Executive Board. Friend also serves as a representative of the Women's Committee of the International Confederation of Free Trade Unions.

Friend also received an appointment to the Board of Voices for Working Families, a nonprofit organization created to ensure that everyone in the U.S. can participate fully in America's political life.

Friend's third attempt in nine years to organize Delta Air Lines flight attendants again ended in failure on November 3, 2010 when the National Mediation Board announced at the end of the latest voting period that the "no union" choice on the ballot won the election. AFA has filed objections to the election with the National Mediation Board documenting hundreds of incidents of alleged interference. Those charges are pending as of January 1, 2011.

She retired from the AFA office at the end of 2010.

Born in the Midwest and raised in Oklahoma, Friend is now based in Washington, D.C., and has retired as a United Airlines flight attendant.

== Notes ==
Trade union offices
Preceded by Dee Maki	President of the Association of Flight Attendants; 1995–2010	Succeeded by Veda Shook
