= Tad Friend =

American journalist

Theodore Porter "Tad" Friend (born September 25, 1962) is a staff writer for The New Yorker who writes the magazine's "Letter from California".

== Life ==
Born in Buffalo, New York, Friend was raised there and in Swarthmore, Pennsylvania, where his father, Theodore Friend, was president of Swarthmore College. He was educated at The Shipley School and Harvard University.

Friend was a contributing editor at various publications, including Esquire, prior to becoming a staff writer at The New Yorker in 1998. His work there includes the magazine's "Letter from California". In 2001, he published "Lost in Mongolia: Travels in Hollywood and Other Foreign Lands", a collection of his articles. His memoir, Cheerful Money: Me, My Family, and the Last Days of Wasp Splendor, was published in 2009.

Friend is married to food writer Amanda Hesser, with whom he has twin children. He lives in Brooklyn Heights.

== Bibliography ==
=== Books ===
- Friend, Tad (2001). Lost in Mongolia: travels in Hollywood and other foreign lands. New York: Random House.
- — (2009). Cheerful money: me, my family, and the last days of WASP splendor. New York: Little, Brown.
- — (2011). Planet killers: a spine-tingling look at near-earth objects, mass extinctions, and the controversial science of planetary defense (eBook). Byliner.
- — (2022). In the Early Times: A Life Reframed. New York: Crown.

=== Interviews ===
- Whiting, Sam (October 9, 2005). "New Yorker West : Tad Friend, part-time Californian". San Francisco Chronicle.
