= Sara Nelson (union leader) =

American union leader (born 1973)

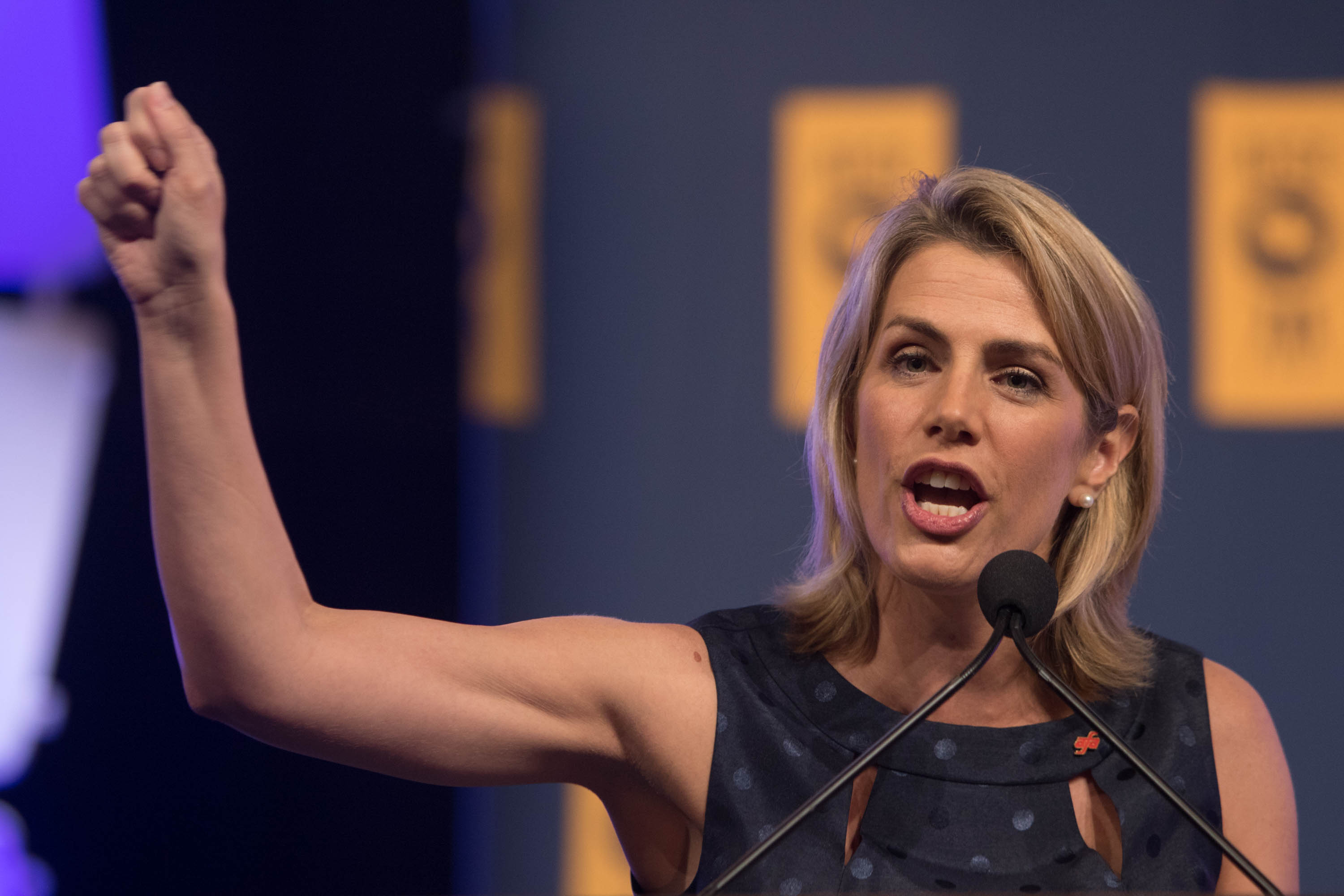
- Sara Nelson at the AFGE convention in 2015
- Born: March 11, 1973 (age 53); Corvallis, Oregon, U.S.
- Education: Principia College (BA)
- Political party: Democratic
- Spouse: David Borer
- Children: 1

Sara Nelson (born March 11, 1973) is an American union leader who serves as the international president of the Association of Flight Attendants-CWA, AFL–CIO. A United Airlines flight attendant since 1996, she previously served as AFA's international vice president for a term beginning January 1, 2011. AFA-CWA represents nearly 50,000 flight attendants at 20 airlines.

== Early life and education ==
Nelson was born and raised in Corvallis, Oregon. Raised in the Church of Christ, Scientist, Nelson's mother worked as a music teacher and her father worked in the lumber industry. After graduating from Corvallis High School, she earned a Bachelor of Arts degree from Principia College in 1995, where she majored in English and education.

== Career ==
Nelson initially intended to pursue acting but instead worked four jobs to pay off her student debt, including as a substitute teacher, waitress, linen salesperson, and temp at an insurance agency.

Nelson has been a flight attendant with United Airlines since August 1996. Soon after beginning her career, based in Boston for United Airlines, Nelson became an activist in the Boston AFA Local. She served in a variety of roles including the elected position of Council Representative. In 2002, Nelson was selected by AFA leaders at United Airlines to serve as Communications Chair.

In nearly 10 years as the union's chief spokesperson for United flight attendants, Nelson played a central role in the union's strategic response to major events affecting the airline industry. In 2002, a year after the devastating impact of the September 11 Attacks rocked the airline industry, the SARS outbreak devastated international air travel. Airlines including United Airlines undertook cost-cutting measures, and Nelson served as the primary spokesperson for the union during those extensive pre-bankruptcy reorganization negotiations. By December 2002, when United Airlines filed the largest corporate bankruptcy in U.S. history, Nelson was leading both the internal and external communications response to what would become one of the longest corporate bankruptcies when it finally ended over three years later. When United used the bankruptcy to terminate the flight attendants pension plan, Nelson announced AFA's intent to engage in a strike.

She later served simultaneously as the union's CHAOS strike chair during two rounds of labor negotiations, and provided communications support to other groups of AFA flight attendants, including those at Northwest Airlines where she served as AFA spokesperson during bankruptcy negotiations and strike preparations. In 2011 Nelson left the communications post when she was elected International Vice President, the union's number two leadership position.

=== Organizing ===
Shortly after her election as International Vice President, Nelson undertook the leadership of AFA's internal and external organizing efforts. Under her leadership AFA prevailed in a representation election versus the International Association of Machinists for the bargaining rights covering the combined flight attendant workforce of United Airlines, Continental Airlines and Continental Micronesia following the merger of those carriers. Covering nearly 25,000 workers, that campaign culminated in one of the largest private sector union elections in decades. She later led the union's successful organizing drive to represent the combined unit of flight attendants from Mesaba Airlines, Colgan Air and Pinnacle Airlines, following the merger that created Endeavor Airlines.

Nelson also led AFA's No Knives Ever Again Campaign in 2013. The Transportation Security Administration (TSA) reversed its decision to allow knives on passenger flights, after first announcing it would lift the knife ban. Their rationale was that national security would be advanced if TSA officers spent less time looking for knives and more time watching for explosives. AFA, with VP Sara Nelson leading the campaign, persuaded TSA executives that knives have no place on the aircraft. Featured on the Today Show, Nelson was able to effectively challenge the TSA lifting the ban on allowing knives on passenger airplanes. Morning Joe featured an interview with Nelson, citing "Growing Outrage" about the lifting of the ban. Featured on BBC, Nelson took the campaign international to add growing pressure. Forbes later interviewed Nelson, after the ban was reinstated. According to Nelson, the campaign succeeded because it worked as a coalition with congressional leaders, was backed by a legal team, arranged demonstrations at airports, and exerted "pressure from all sides."

=== International office ===
Nelson was elected to the position of AFA International President in April 2014 and took office June 1, 2014. As International President, Nelson is the top officer of AFA, responsible for the overall leadership and direction of the union. She serves as chair of the union's annual convention, the AFA Board of Directors, as well as the union's executive board. She is the chief spokesperson for the union, and the primary liaison with other unions and labor organizations, airlines, industry groups and governmental agencies.

Taking office as International Vice President of AFA in 2011, Nelson was responsible for the union's organizing, communications and leadership development programs. Nelson also testified regularly before the United States Congress on issues of importance to flight attendants, like the Known Crew Member Program and the No Knives Campaign.

In 2019 Nelson played a key role in the 2018–19 United States federal government shutdown. On January 20, 2019, nearly a month into the shutdown, Nelson called for a general strike. In a speech on January 24, 2019, Nelson excoriated government officials for the shutdown, citing 800,000 federal workers who were forced to work for free or furloughed without pay. Nelson argued that TSA officers and air traffic controllers were distracted by the burdens the shutdown placed on them, and that was eroding the safety of the airline industry. The shutdown ended the next day as flights began to be cancelled at New York La Guardia Airport due to air traffic controllers no longer able to serve safely due to the impact of the shutdown.

Nelson's militancy as a labor leader and her skill as a communicator have both been recognized as key to her effectiveness in the shutdown fight and beyond. InStyle named Nelson as one of its "50 Badass Women".

Nelson was instrumental in guiding the AFA through the COVID-19 pandemic in 2020. As flight attendants faced mass furlough threats, health risks, and schedule instability, Nelson pushed for payroll support programs (PSP) to support airline workers for 16 months.

=== Other positions ===
On August 12, 2014, Nelson was elected to the Aviation Steering Committee of the International Transport Workers' Federation (ITF), the global federation of transportation unions from 148 countries, representing a combined membership of 4.5 million, at the ITF Congress in Sofia, Bulgaria.

On May 13, 2020, Nelson was named co-chair of the Economy Task Force formed by Democratic nominee Joe Biden and former candidate Bernie Sanders to create a unity platform for the Democratic Party.

After Joe Biden won the 2020 United States presidential election, Nelson was mentioned as a possible cabinet appointee for a position in the United States Department of Labor. In February 2023, it was reported that Nelson was being considered by the Biden administration as a potential successor to secretary of labor Marty Walsh after his resignation. However, Deputy Secretary of Labor Julie Su was chosen instead.

== Personal life ==
Nelson and her husband, David Borer, live in Washington, D.C., and have one daughter. Borer is an attorney serving as the general counsel of the American Federation of Government Employees.

Trade union offices
Preceded by Veda Shook	President of the Association of Flight Attendants; 2014–present	Succeeded by Incumbent
