= Theodore Friend =

American historian and novelist (1931–2020)

- Born: Theodore Wood Friend III; August 27, 1931; Pittsburgh, Pennsylvania, U.S.
- Died: November 4, 2020 (aged 89); Villanova, Pennsylvania, U.S.
- Occupations: Historian, novelist, professor
- Title: President, Swarthmore College
- Board member of: Foreign Policy Research Institute; Harry S. Truman Scholarship Foundation; Eisenhower Exchange Fellowships Foundation
- Spouse: Elizabeth Friend (m. 1960–2003)
- Children: Elizabeth Friend; Pier Friend; Tad Friend
- Parent(s): Theodore Friend Jr. (father); Jessica H. (née Merrick) Friend (mother)

Academic background
- Education: Williams College (BA); Yale University (PhD)

Academic work
- Institutions: State University of New York at Buffalo (1959–1973); Swarthmore College (1973-1982); Johns Hopkins University, School of Advanced International Studies (2004)
- Notable works: Between Two Empires: The Ordeal of the Philippines, 1929–1946 (1965)

Theodore Wood Friend III (August 27, 1931 – November 4, 2020) was an American historian, novelist, and teacher, and a former president of Swarthmore College.

== Early life and education ==
He was born in Pittsburgh, Pennsylvania, the son of Theodore Jr. and Jessica H. (née Merrick) Friend (known as Dorie). He attended St. Paul's School in Concord, New Hampshire. He graduated from Williams College with a B.A. in 1953 and from Yale University with a Ph.D. in 1958.

== Career ==
In 1959, Friend joined the history faculty of the State University of New York at Buffalo, where he taught for 14 years. He was a Fulbright Scholar in the Philippines, where his work formed the basis for his first book, Between Two Empires: The Ordeal of the Philippines, 1929–1946 (1965). It won the prestigious Bancroft Prize in American History, Foreign Policy, and Diplomacy.

He was president emeritus of Eisenhower Fellowships; he then continued as a trustee of its national and international board. He was also a senior fellow at the Foreign Policy Research Institute. Friend chaired the review panel for the Harry S. Truman Scholarship Foundation. In 2004 he served as distinguished visiting professor of Southeast Asian studies at the Johns Hopkins University, School of Advanced International Studies.

=== President of Swarthmore College ===
In 1973, Friend was selected to serve as Swarthmore College’s eleventh president. He faced a number of challenges. Just a few years before, his predecessor, Courtney Smith, had died in his office during a student protest, and another predecessor had held the position only briefly. Within a year of his taking office, the value of the college's endowment dropped more than 50%. The country was also in the midst of the Vietnam War and the Watergate crisis; confidence in the nation's leadership was at a low ebb. Six weeks after he began work in Parrish Hall, Friend found that his office had been trashed by students who were protesting America's engagement in Vietnam — a war that he had long publicly opposed.

Although he acknowledged that his years in office were difficult, Friend accomplished much during his tenure. He reinvigorated the Honors Program, successfully completed the college's $30 million Program for Swarthmore campaign, and oversaw a significant increase in admissions applications, which ran counter to national trends.

Priorities for the Program for Swarthmore campaign included new scholarships, professorships, and curriculum development. The Program also supported construction of Cornell Science Library, Ware Pool, and Mertz Hall, as well as improvements to several academic buildings. Upon the campaign's conclusion in 1981, the board of managers honored Friend and his wife, a vital presence on campus, by creating the Theodore and Elizabeth Friend Scholarship. It is awarded annually on the basis of financial need to a worthy student.

In the mid-1970s, one of those challenges at Swarthmore was a gender discrimination suit (Presseisen v. Swarthmore College) filed by assistant professor Barbara Presseisen, who taught in Swarthmore's education department from 1969 to 1971; she and others alleged unfair treatment of female faculty members. Although the suit was ultimately decided in the college's favor, it exposed some concerning practices. In response, Friend established a new, part-time position for an equal opportunity officer. The college also adopted a nondiscrimination employment policy. Friend held open office hours for students and took an active interest in student concerns. Together with his wife Elizabeth Friend, he regularly hosted salons in their home.

Friend was also a devoted squash player; for a single week in 1965, he was the top-ranked player in Buffalo.

In 1982, the Swarthmore student newspaper The Phoenix ran an op-ed in the last issue of Friend's presidency that concluded he left a legacy “far greater” than the actions he carried out during his formal duties as president.

As president, Friend built the organization's endowment and brought to the U.S. the first fellows from China, El Salvador, Mozambique, Zambia, and Zimbabwe. In addition, Guatemala and Iraq participated in the program after a 25-year hiatus. His fundraising prowess at both Swarthmore and EEF led him to call himself a “not-for-profiteer.”

=== After Swarthmore ===
After Swarthmore, Friend served as president of the Philadelphia-based Eisenhower Exchange Fellowships Foundation (EEF) from 1984 to 1996. Friend left EEF in 1996. He also served for many years as a senior fellow in the Asia Program at the Foreign Policy Research Institute. In 2004, he served as the C.V. Starr Distinguished Visiting Professor of Southeast Asia Studies at Johns Hopkins University's School of Advanced International Studies.

Friend went on to publish three more works of history and analysis. In Indonesian Destinies (2003), he examined the Indonesian nation state from revolution against the Dutch through the solving of the 2002 terrorist bombings in Bali. The book received the best reviews of his career, and was considered a landmark in studies of the country. One specialist called it "a powerful book [...] beautifully written". He also edited a collection of essays, Religion and Religiosity in the Philippines and Indonesia (2006). And in 2011, he published Woman, Man, and God in Modern Islam, a comparative study of the life of women in Indonesia, Pakistan, Saudi Arabia, Iran, and Turkey.

Yet Friend, who lived in Villanova, was never far from campus for long. In 2005, he established the Theodore Friend and Elizabeth Pierson Friend Scholarship for a student from an Islamic country or a student engaged in Islamic studies. He attended the presidential inaugurations of Rebecca Chopp in 2009 and Valerie Smith in 2015. He also spoke on campus in 2012 about his journeys across Asia and the Middle East.

His papers are held at Swarthmore College.

== Personal life ==
In 1960, he married Elizabeth, who died in 2003. They had three children: Elizabeth, Pier, and the writer Tad Friend.

== Awards ==
- 1966 Bancroft Prize

== Works ==
- Indonesian Destinies. Harvard University Press. 2003. ISBN 978-0-674-01137-3.
- Between Two Empires: The Ordeal of the Philippines, 1929-1946. Yale University Press. 1965. ISBN 978-0-598-44164-5.
- The Blue-Eyed Enemy: Japan against the West in Java and Luzon, 1942-1945. Princeton University Press. 2014. ISBN 978-1-4008-5946-7.
- Family Laundry. Beaufort Books. 1986. ISBN 978-0-8253-0388-3.
- Woman, Man, and God in Modern Islam. Wm. B. Eerdmans Publishing. ISBN 978-1-4674-3636-6.
