= Senator Friend =

Senator Friend may refer to:

- Francis H. Friend (1898–1958), Maine State Senate
- Kelsey Friend Sr. (1922–2001), Kentucky State Senate
- Mike Friend (born 1961), Nebraska State Senate
