= John Friend (footballer) =

Australian rules footballer

Personal information
- Full name: John Friend
- Born: 24 February 1953
- Original team: Geelong Amateurs
- Height: 188 cm (6 ft 2 in)
- Weight: 86 kg (190 lb)

Playing career^{1}
Years	Club	Games (Goals)
1971	Geelong	1 (0)
- ^{1} Playing statistics correct to the end of 1971.

John Friend (born 24 February 1953) is a former Australian rules footballer who played with Geelong in the Victorian Football League (VFL).
