= John Albert Newton Friend =

British chemist

John Albert Newton Friend (20 July 1881 – 15 April 1966) was a British chemist and educator who specialized in the chemistry of corrosion and its prevention. He was among the first to note that chromium enhances the corrosion resistance of steel. He edited a multi-volume textbook of inorganic chemistry.

Friend was born in Newton Abbott, son of a Methodist clergyman Hilderic Friend, and after the family moved to Birmingham, he was educated there at King Edwards' School and then went to Birmingham University, receiving a BSc in 1902 and MSc in 1903. His teachers included John Henry Poynting and Percy Frankland. He taught for a while at Watford Grammar School to enable him to pay for his study at the University of Würzburg, receiving a doctorate in 1908. He then taught chemistry at the Darlington Technical School until 1912 when he became headmaster at the Victoria Institute Science and Technical Schools, Worcester. During World War I, he served with the Royal Engineers. He moved to the Birmingham Technical College in 1920 and worked there until his retirement in 1946. During World War II, he was involved in training members of the Home Guard on chemical warfare.

Friend wrote a number of popular books on chemistry and worked especially on corrosion and its prevention, colloid chemistry, electrochemistry, as well as inorganic chemical reactions. Outside of chemistry, he also took an interest in the history of witchcraft, Birmingham, recreational mathematics and numerology:

- The Theory of Valency, 1909
- An Introduction to the Chemistry of Paints, London, 1910
- Elementary Domestic Chemistry, London, 1911
- The Corrosion of Iron and Steel, London, 1911
- Editor: Textbook of Inorganic Chemistry, 22 volumes, London, 1914–1930
- The Chemistry of Linseed Oil, London, 1917
- The Chemistry of Combustion, London, 1922
- Iron in Antiquity, London, 1926
- A Textbook of Physical Chemistry, 2 volumes, London, 1932–1935, reprinted 1948
- Man and the Chemical Elements, London, 1951
- Numbers: Fun and Facts, New York, 1954
- Words. Tricks and Traditions, New York, 1957
- Science Data, London, 1960
- More Numbers; Fun and Facts, New York, 1961
- Demonology, Sympathetic Magic and Witchcraft, London, 1961
- Still More Numbers: Fun and Facts, New York, 1964
