= Friend (disambiguation) =

A friend is a partner in a mutual interpersonal relationship.

Friend or The Friend may also refer to:

== Arts and entertainment ==
=== Films/movies ===
- Friend (1987 film), a Soviet drama
- Friend (2001 film), a South Korean neo-noir action film, remade as a 2009 TV series
  - Friend: The Great Legacy, a 2013 sequel
- Our Friend, originally released as The Friend, a 2019 American biographical film
- The Friend (2024 film), an American drama

=== Television ===
- Friend, Our Legend, a South Korean drama, a remake of the 2001 film Friend
- "Friend", an episode of Death Note
- "Friend" (Not Going Out), a 2022 episode
- "The Friend", an episode of Frasier
- "The Friend" (The Amazing World of Gumball), a 2015 episode

=== Music ===
- Friend (album), by S.E.S.
- Friend (EP), by Grizzly Bear
- "Friend" (song), by Christine McVie
- "Friend", a song by 12 Rods from Gay?
- "Friend", a song by Ayumi Hamasaki, B-side of the single "Poker Face"
- "Friend", a song by Gracie Abrams from Minor
- "Friend", a song by Iyaz from Replay
- "Friend", a song by Wild Colonials from Reel Life, Vol. 1
- "Friend", a song by Benson Boone from Fireworks & Rollerblades

=== Novels ===
- Friend (Henstell novel), 1985, by Diana Henstell
- Friend (Paek novel), 1988, by Paek Nam-nyong
- The Friend (novel), 2018, by Sigrid Nunez

== People ==
- Friend (surname)
- Friend (given name)
- Friend, a member of the Quakers (Religious Society of Friends)
- Public Universal Friend (1752–1819), a preacher also known as "the Friend"

== Publications ==
- The Friend (Quaker magazine), a British magazine
- The Friend (LDS magazine), a Latter-day Saint children's magazine
- The Friend (newspaper), a monthly Honolulu newspaper for seamen (1843–1910)
- The Friend, a short-lived weekly publication (1809–1810) published by Samuel Taylor Coleridge

== Places in the United States ==
- Friend, Kansas, an unincorporated community
- Friend, Nebraska, a city
- Friend, Oregon, an unincorporated community

== Other uses ==
- Friend (product), an AI wearable device and chatbot
- Friend (automobile), an American automobile
- Friend (climbing), a type of spring-loaded rock climbing anchor
- Friend (Facebook), a mutual relationship between two Facebook users
- Friend (MBTA station), a former Boston, Massachusetts, transit station
- friend function, an object-oriented programming relationship
- friend class, an object-oriented programming relationship

== See also ==
- Friend of the court, or amicus curiae, a party not involved in a case who offers the court information or other assistance
- Friends (disambiguation)
- My Friend (disambiguation)
- Frend (disambiguation)
- Freind
- Rafiki (disambiguation), Swahili for "friend"
- Unfriend (disambiguation)
