= Amigo =

Amigo(s) (Portuguese and Spanish for male friend) may refer to:

== People ==
- Carlos Amigo Vallejo (1934–2022), Spanish Roman Catholic archbishop emeritus of Seville

== Places ==
=== Facilities ===
- Amigos School, a bilingual primary school in Cambridge, Massachusetts, U.S.
- Los Amigos Biological Station, a research station in Peru
- Los Amigos High School, Fountain Valley, California, U.S.

=== Other places ===
- Amigo, West Virginia, U.S., an unincorporated community
- Los Amigos River, a river in Peru

== Businesses and products ==
- Amigo (restaurant), a Hong Kong restaurant
- Amigo Comics, a Spanish comic book publisher
- Amigo Energy, an American retail electricity provider
- Amigo Holdings, a British lender
- Amigo Mobility, an American electric mobility devices manufacturer
- Amigo Spiele, a German board and card game publisher
- Amigo Supermarkets, a chain of supermarkets in Puerto Rico owned by Pueblo
- Amigos Creations, an Indian film production company
- Amigos Library Services, an American company
- Isuzu Amigo, a compact SUV
- GM Amigo, a basic utility vehicle
- IGO amigo, a version of the navigation software platform iGO

== Film, television and theatre ==
- Amigo (film), a 2010 film by John Sayles
- Amigos (film), a 2023 Indian Telugu-language action-thriller film
- Deaf Smith & Johnny Ears, also known as Los Amigos, a 1972-73 spaghetti Western film
- Amigo (1980 film), a film starring Andrés García
- Amigo (TV series), a Norwegian game show for kids
- "¡Amigos!", an episode of Arrested Development
- Amigos (play), a 2004 play by David Williamson
- The Amigos, a group of fictional penguins in the 2006 film Happy Feet

== Music ==
=== Bands ===
- Die Amigos, a German music band

=== Albums ===
- Amigo (Arlo Guthrie album), 1976
- Amigo (David Ball album), 2001
- Amigo (Kendji Girac album), 2018
- Amigos (Santana album), 1976
- Amigos (Paul Anka album), 1996
- Amigo, a 1990 album by Grupo Bronco
- Amigos, a 1989 album by Lindisfarne
- The Shinee World, 2008 album by South Korean boy band Shinee re-released as Amigo

=== Songs ===
- "Amigo", by Olavi Virta, 1954
- "Amigo" (Roberto Carlos song), 1977
- "Amigo", by Roberto Blanco, 1978
- "Amigo" (Black Slate song), 1980
- "Amigo", by Lake from Ouch!, 1980/81
- "Amigo", by Toque Profundo from Sueños Y Pesadillas Del 3er Mundo, 1992
- "Amigo", by Quickspace, 1998
- "Amigo", by David Ball from Amigo, 2001
- "Amigo" (Shinee song), 2008

== Other uses ==
- Amigos de las Américas (AMIGOS), a non-profit organization
- AmiGO, a web-based search tool for the Gene Ontology project

== See also ==
- Amiga (disambiguation)
- Amica (disambiguation)
- Amicus (disambiguation)
- Friends (disambiguation)
- Mi Amigo (disambiguation)
- Three Amigos (disambiguation)
- Tres Amigos (disambiguation)
- Amiibo, a toys-to-life platform by Nintendo
