= Amicus =

Amicus is Latin for 'friend' or 'comrade'. The word may refer to:

== Organizations ==
- Amicus (trade union), the British trade union that merged with the Transport and General Workers Union to form Unite
- Amicus Bank, a former bank based in Canada
- Amicus Productions, a British film production company
- Amicus (charity), a UK-based non-profit organization

== Places ==
- Amicus, Illinois, a former name of Sciota, a village in Illinois, US
- Amicus, Virginia, an unincorporated community in Greene County, Virginia, US

== People with the name ==
- Amicus, O.S.B. Roman Catholic monk, abbot, and cardinal (1117–1130)
- Bartholomeus Amicus (1562–1649), Jesuit priest, teacher, and writer
- William Alexander (Quaker) (1768-1841) English Quaker and publisher, who wrote under this name
- Peter Dodds McCormick (pen name: Amicus) (1834–1916), composer of Advance Australia Fair

== Law ==
- Amicus curiae, a legal Latin phrase, literally translated as "friend of the court"
- Proximus amicus, a legal Latin phrase, literally translated as "next friend"

== Other uses ==
- Project Amicus, a geosocial networking app
- Amicus, the former name of OnEarth, published by the Natural Resources Defense Council
- Amicus, a journal published by the Michigan State University College of Law
- Amicus (alga), a genus of green algae in the family Dasycladaceae
- Amicus (crustacean), a fossil genus of ostracods in the family Knoxitidae
- Advance Australia Fair, national anthem of Australia, originally published under the pseudonym "Amicus".
- Amicus Mountain, a summit in Canada

== See also ==
- Amica (disambiguation)
- Amico (disambiguation)
- Amiga (disambiguation)
- Amigo (disambiguation)
