= Amica =

Amica is the Latin word for "friend" in the feminine (i.e., "female friend") and may also refer to:

== Businesses and products ==
- Amica Mutual Insurance, a US-based insurance company
- Hyundai Amica, a city car produced by Hyundai
- Amica (company), a Polish manufacturer of white goods and kitchen equipment

== Film, television and theatre ==
- Amica (opera), an opera by Pietro Mascagni

== Sports ==
- Amica Wronki, a Polish football club
- Amica Chips-Knauf, a former cycling team based in San Marino

== Other uses ==
- Amica (band), an Australian pop group for 6 to 12-year-olds
- Amica (cicada), a genus of cicadas
- Amica (magazine), an Italian fashion magazine
- Bel Amica, a ghost ship
- Amica Temple of Radiance, a new religious movement
- Automatic Musical Instruments Collector's Association

== See also ==
- Amico (disambiguation)
- Amicus (disambiguation)
- Amiga (disambiguation)
- Amigo (disambiguation)
