= Friendship (disambiguation) =

Friendship is co-operative and supportive behavior between two or more humans.

Friendship may also refer to:

== Places ==
=== United States ===
- Friendship, Arkansas, a town
- Friendship, Indiana, an unincorporated community
- Friendship, Kentucky, an unincorporated community
- Friendship, Maine, a town
- Friendship, Anne Arundel County, Maryland, an unincorporated community and census-designated place
- Friendship, Worcester County, Maryland, an unincorporated community
- Friendship, New Jersey, an unincorporated community
- Friendship, New York, a town
  - Friendship (CDP), New York, a hamlet in the town
- Friendship, Cherokee County, North Carolina
- Friendship, Wake County, North Carolina
- Friendship, Ohio, a census-designated place
- Friendship, Oklahoma, a town
- Friendship, South Carolina, an unincorporated community
- Friendship, Tennessee, a city
- Friendship, Texas, a town
- Friendship, Virginia, an unincorporated community
- Friendship (town), Wisconsin, Fond du Lac County
- Friendship (village), Wisconsin, Adams County
- Friendship (Pittsburgh), a neighborhood of Pittsburgh, Pennsylvania
- Friendship (Stevensville, Maryland), a 1740 historic home on the National Register of Historic Places
- Friendship Township, Greene County, Arkansas, Greene County, Arkansas
- Friendship Township, Michigan
- Friendship Township, Minnesota
- Friendship Creek, New Jersey
- Friendship State Trail, Wisconsin

=== Elsewhere ===
- Friendship, Suriname, a town
- Mount Friendship, Himachal Pradesh, India
- Khüiten Peak or Friendship Peak, China
- Friendship Pass, a mountain pass in China

== Ships ==
- HMS Friendship, five Royal Navy ships
- Friendship (ship), various sailing ships
- Friendship 500, a former name of the McBarge

== Aircraft ==
- Fokker F27 Friendship, a turboprop airliner
- "Friendship", a Fokker Trimotor aircraft in which Amelia Earhart became the first woman passenger to cross the Atlantic Ocean by air

== Arts and entertainment ==
=== Music ===
- Friendship (indie rock band), an American indie rock band
- Friendship (jazz fusion band), an American jazz fusion band

==== Albums ====
- Friendship (Lee Ritenour album), 1978
- Friendship (Friendship album), 1979
- Friendship (Perico Sambeat album), 2003
- Friendship (Ray Charles album), 1984
- Friendship (The Redneck Manifesto album), 2010
- Friendship, by Ash Ra Tempel, 2014
- Friend-Ship, by Hori7on, 2023

==== Songs ====
- "Friendship", by Pops Staples from Don't Lose This, 2015
- "Friendship", by Sloan from Between the Bridges, 1999
- "Friendship", by Tenacious D from Tenacious D, 2001
- Friendship (Cole Porter song), written by Cole Porter for the musical Du Barry Was a Lady, 1939; later interpolated into revivals of the musical Anything Goes
- "Friendship", a 2018 track by Toby Fox from Deltarune Chapter 1 OST from the video game Deltarune
- "Friend Ship", by Gen Hoshino from Yellow Dancer, 2015

=== Films ===
- Friendship (2008 film), a Thai film
- Friendship (2021 film), an Indian Tamil-language film
- Friendship (2024 film), a comedy starring Tim Robinson and Paul Rudd
- Friendship!, a 2010 German film
- Snegithiye, a 2000 Indian film, also known as Friendship
- Dostana (2008 film), or Friendship, a 2008 Indian film by Tarun Mansukhani

=== Other ===
- The Friendship, a 1987 children's book by Mildred Taylor
- Friendship (Mortal Kombat), a finishing move in the video game series Mortal Kombat
- "Friendship" (Spy in the Wild), a nature documentary episode
- "Friendship" (Live with Yourself!), a webtoon storyline
- "Friendship", a season 2 episode of Teen Titans Go!

== Other uses ==
- Friendship (NGO), an organization established in Bangladesh in 1998
- Friendship College, Rock Hill, South Carolina, United States, a college from 1891 to 1981
- Friendship Christian School (disambiguation)

== See also ==
- Order of Friendship (disambiguation), various decorations
- "Friend Ship" (Steven Universe), an episode of Steven Universe
- West Friendship, Maryland
- Frenship, an American pop duo
- Friends (disambiguation)
