= Amica glauca =

Scientific classification
- Kingdom: Animalia
- Phylum: Arthropoda
- Clade: Pancrustacea
- Class: Insecta
- Order: Hemiptera
- Suborder: Auchenorrhyncha
- Family: Cicadidae
- Genus: Amica
- Species: A. glauca

Binomial name
- Amica glauca Moulds & Marshall, 2025

Species of cicada

Amica glauca is a species of cicada, also known as the bluebush cicada, in the true cicada family, Cicadettinae subfamily and Pictilini tribe. The species is endemic to Australia. It was described in 2025 by Australian entomologists Maxwell Sydney Moulds and David C. Marshall.

== Etymology ==
The specific epithet glauca, from Greek: γλαυκός (blue-grey), refers to the colour of the plants favoured by the cicadas.

== Description ==
The length of the forewing is 14–15 mm. Body length is 12–14 mm.

== Distribution and habitat ==
The species occurs in north-western New South Wales near White Cliffs, and in South Australia from Marree southwards to Hawker. The associated habitat is arid saltbush and bluebush shrubland.
