= Chrysocicada franceaustralae =

Scientific classification
- Kingdom: Animalia
- Phylum: Arthropoda
- Clade: Pancrustacea
- Class: Insecta
- Order: Hemiptera
- Suborder: Auchenorrhyncha
- Family: Cicadidae
- Genus: Chrysocicada
- Species: C. franceaustrale

Binomial name
- Chrysocicada franceaustrale Boulard, 1989

Species of cicada

Chrysocicada franceaustrale is a species of cicada, also known as the broad-headed alea, in the true cicada family, Cicadettinae subfamily and Pictilini tribe. The species is endemic to Australia. It was described in 1989 by French entomologist Michel Boulard.

== Etymology ==
The specific epithet franceaustrale refers to the 1988 France-Australe Bicentenary Expedition to Shark Bay, in the course of which the species was discovered.

== Description ==
The length of the forewing is 16–22 mm.

== Distribution and habitat ==
The species is only known from Meda Station, north-west Western Australia. The associated habitat is low grassy eucalypt woodland.

== Behaviour ==
Adult males may be heard in January and February, clinging to low vegetation, emitting distinctive buzzing calls.
