= Chrysocicada inflata =

Scientific classification
- Kingdom: Animalia
- Phylum: Arthropoda
- Clade: Pancrustacea
- Class: Insecta
- Order: Hemiptera
- Suborder: Auchenorrhyncha
- Family: Cicadidae
- Genus: Chrysocicada
- Species: C. inflata

Binomial name
- Chrysocicada inflata Emery & Emery, 2023

Species of cicada

Chrysocicada inflata is a species of cicada, also known as the narrow-headed alea, in the true cicada family, Cicadettinae subfamily and Pictilini tribe. The species is endemic to Australia. It was described in 2023 by Australian entomologists David L. Emery and Nathan J. Emery.

== Etymology ==
The specific epithet inflata (Latin: “inflated” or “expanded”) is an anatomical reference to the relatively swollen abdomen of the species.

== Description ==
The length of the forewing is 12–13 mm.

== Distribution and habitat ==
The species is only known from Exmouth and Karratha in north-west Western Australia. The associated habitat is grassland.

== Behaviour ==
Adult males may be heard in October and November, clinging to grass stems, emitting short, erratic buzzing calls.
