= Amica sitis =

Scientific classification
- Kingdom: Animalia
- Phylum: Arthropoda
- Clade: Pancrustacea
- Class: Insecta
- Order: Hemiptera
- Suborder: Auchenorrhyncha
- Family: Cicadidae
- Genus: Amica
- Species: A. sitis

Binomial name
- Amica sitis Moulds & Marshall, 2025

Species of cicada

Amica sitis is a species of cicada, also known as the Woomera green friendly, in the true cicada family, Cicadettinae subfamily and Pictilini tribe. The species is endemic to Australia. It was described in 2025 by Australian entomologists Maxwell Sydney Moulds and David C. Marshall.

== Etymology ==
The specific epithet sitis, from Latin (“thirst” or “dryness”), refers to the cicadas’ arid habitat.

== Description ==
The length of the forewing is 13–14 mm. Body length is 13–15 mm.

== Distribution and habitat ==
The species occurs in arid South Australia, where specimens were collected on the Stuart Highway 25 km and 92 km south of Coober Pedy. The associated habitat is low shrubland with saltbush and other shrubs.
