= Chrysocicada trophis =

Scientific classification
- Kingdom: Animalia
- Phylum: Arthropoda
- Clade: Pancrustacea
- Class: Insecta
- Order: Hemiptera
- Suborder: Auchenorrhyncha
- Family: Cicadidae
- Genus: Chrysocicada
- Species: C. trophis

Binomial name
- Chrysocicada trophis Moulds & Marshall, 2022

Species of cicada

Chrysocicada trophis is a species of cicada, also known as the golden alea, in the true cicada family, Cicadettinae subfamily and Pictilini tribe. The species is endemic to Australia. It was described in 2022 by Australian entomologists Maxwell Sydney Moulds and David C. Marshall.

== Etymology ==
The specific epithet trophis, from Greek τροφόεις (“well-fed” or “stout”), refers to the inflated male abdomen.

== Description ==
The length of the forewing is 13–16 mm.

== Distribution and habitat ==
The species is only known from Meda Station in north-west Western Australia. The associated habitat is grassland.

== Behaviour ==
Adult males may be heard in February, clinging to low vegetation, emitting clean, buzzing and whining calls, produced in long bursts.
