= Anthony Neely =

American-Taiwanese singer and actor (born 1986)

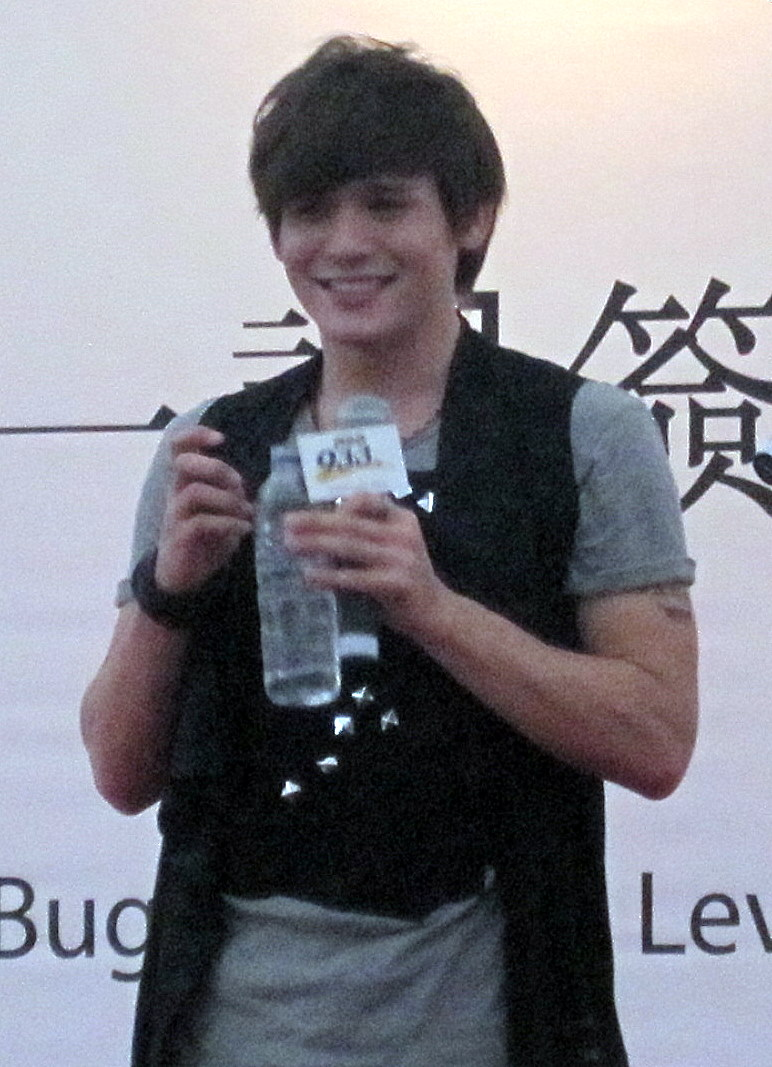
- Anthony Neely at an autograph session in Singapore, 2011
- Born: May 20, 1986 (age 40); Millbrae, California, US
- Education: Burlingame High School
- Occupations: Singer; songwriter; actor
- Years active: 2009–present
- Spouse: Vivi Lee (m. 2010; div. 2018) Kris Kuan (m. 2022)
- Children: 1
- Musical career
- Genre: Mandopop
- Instruments: Guitar, piano
- Label: HIM International Music (2009–2014)

Anthony Neely (born May 20, 1986) is an American singer and actor. His father is American and his mother is Taiwanese. In 2009, Neely participated in Taiwanese singing competition One Million Star (Season 5) as a PK (Player Kill) challenger. His performances created sensations after receiving full marks of 25 points on three occasions, and also being the first in the reality show's history to score a record 33 out of 25 points.

== Early years ==
Neely double-majored in psychology and theatre studies at the University of California, San Diego (UCSD). He is bilingual in English and Mandarin Chinese. Neely grew up in the San Francisco Bay Area in a small suburb, Millbrae, California. He graduated from Burlingame High School in 2004.

== Career ==
Neely performed Hsiao Huang-chi's "You Are My Eyes" (你是我的眼) during his first performance in One Million Star. He said that he did not really understand the meaning behind the lyrics of the song, but was touched by the melody and performed it according to his own feelings. One of the judges of the competition, Phil Chang, was greatly touched by the performance, and praised Neely's rendition for "having a different style from the original singer."

Among his many performances during the singing competition, one stood out: an acoustic version of Damien Rice’s "The Blower's Daughter". Host Matilda Tao then announced to the judges that if the given five points were not enough, they could raise up one hand to represent one point or stand up to represent ten points. Judge Kay Huang stood up, while judges Phil Chang and Roger raised both hands and one hand respectively, giving Neely a total of 33 marks out of the original 25 points any contestant can get.

== Personal life ==
Neely's mother is from Taiwan. His maternal grandparents are from Liaoning, China.

In September 2014, Neely revealed that he had married in 2010 and that his wife, Vivi Li, had given birth to a daughter the year after. The news was revealed in a YouTube video titled "Anthony Neely's True Confession", which was uploaded to his personal YouTube profile on his daughter's third birthday. Over one year after he admitted to infidelity, he and his wife were officially divorced in March 2018.

In March 2022, Neely revealed that he married his mistress, Kris Kuan 5 years after cheating on his then-wife with her.

== Discography ==
=== Studio albums ===
- Lesson One (2010)
- Wake Up (2012)
- Friends (2013)

=== Singles ===
Date	Title	Note	Ref
December 21, 2010	Christmas Song (Merry Christmas To You)	Format: Digital	
July 7, 2011	LOVE LOVE LOVE	Advertisement Song	
November 1, 2011	Departed Heaven 無間天堂	Online Game Theme Song	
February 11, 2012	Bread of Love 愛的麵包	Ending Theme Song if The Soul of the Bread ft. Hank Chen & Michelle Chen	
February 19, 2012	Full of Love; LOVE力全開	Malaysia 998 Radio 15th Anniversary Song	
April 20, 2012	Then 然後	Soundtrack of Absolute Boyfriend	
August 15, 2016	About Loneliness 關於寂寞	Theme Song of Lonely Macchiato	
August 15, 2016	Welcome to Macchiato 歡迎來到瑪奇朵	Soundtrack of Lonely Macchiato with Farbien Yu & Afalean Lufiz	
August 15, 2016	Nothing To Think About 不需要思考的事	Soundtrack of Lonely Macchiato with Pin Chen	
August 15, 2016	What To Say 該怎麼說	Soundtrack of Lonely Macchiato with Farbien Yu	
December 10, 2016	You/Me		
April 29, 2017	Rival in Love 情敵	Theme Song of Evil Women	

=== Theatre ===
Musicals
Year	Title	Role	Notes
2019	Tick, Tick...Boom!	Michael	October 25, 2019 – October 27, 2019
