= Wake Up (Anthony Neely album) =

Studio album by Anthony Neely
- Released: 24 February 2012
- Recorded: 2011–2012
- Genre: Mandopop
- Length: 40:14; 3:01（Pre-order bonus CD）
- Label: HIM International Music
- Producer: SeeTracklist

Anthony Neely chronology
| Lesson One (2010) | Wake Up (2012) | Friends (2013) |

Wake Up is the second studio album from Anthony Neely. This album started pre-order on 18 January 2012 and released on 24 February. The lead single is "Awakening", second single is "A Failed Attempt" and the third single is "Wake Up".

== Tracklisting ==
Disc 1
| No. | Title | Lyrics | Music | Length |
|---|---|---|---|---|
| 1. | "Wake Up" | Neely | Skot Suyama; Anthony Neely | 3:11 |
| 2. | "This Moment" (這一刻) | Jasmine Ting | Skot Suyama | 3:46 |
| 3. | "A Failed Attempt" (失敗的分手) | Daryl Yao | Jun-yuan Su | 4:17 |
| 4. | "Puppet" (魁儡) | Da-wei Ge | Will Peng | 3:26 |
| 5. | "Dear Death" (讓我愛她) | Xin-yan Chen | Skot Suyama | 4:29 |
| 6. | "The Rescue" (救命) | Chen | Skot Suyama | 3:18 |
| 7. | "A River Named Desire" (想念是一條河) | Yang | Zi-pu Yang | 4:52 |
| 8. | "Déjà Vu" (夢裡來過) | Yao | Pete Teo | 4:01 |
| 9. | "Letters" | Neely | Peng | 4:48 |
| 10. | "Awakening" (一覺醒來) | Albert Leung | Peng | 4:06 |
| Total length: | | | | 40:14 |

Pre-order Bonus CD
| No. | Title | Lyrics | Music | Length |
|---|---|---|---|---|
| 1. | "You Are My Baby" (ft.Hank Chen) | Bing-quan Gao; Skot Suyama | Skot Suyama | 3:01 |

== Editions ==
- Pre-order
  - Include the track, "You Are My Baby" the soundtrack from The Soul of the Bread, music videos, film trailer and coaster.
- Standard

== MVs ==
| Title | Director | Date | Channel | Note |
|---|---|---|---|---|
| You Are My Baby | - | 3 February 2012 | YouTube | |
| Awakening | Bill Chia | 20 February 2012 | YouTube | |
| A Failed Attempt | Yuxuan Xu | 6 March 2012 | YouTube | |
| Wake Up | Bill Chia | 4 April 2012 | YouTube | |
| Déjà Vu | - | 8 May 2012 | YouTube | |
| Dear Death | Andrew Gregg; Anthony Neely | 18 July 2012 | YouTube | |

== Chart Performances ==
=== Taiwan ===
| Year | Title | 幽浮 | Hito | MTV | Channel V |
| 2012 | You Are My Baby | 9 | - | - | - |
| | Awakening | 1 | - | 2 | 2 |
| | A Failed Attempt | 4 | 5 | - | - |
| | Wake Up | 6 | 6 | 7 | 8 |
| | Déjà Vu | - | - | - | - |
| | Dear Death | - | - | - | - |

(*)represents it still on chart

=== Hong Kong ===
| Year | Title | 903 | TVB | 997 | RTHK |
| 2012 | Awakening | 7 | - | 1 (Metro Mandarin) | - |

(*)represents it still on chart

=== Singapore ===
| Year | Title | YES933 | Radio1003 |
| 2011 | The Rescue | 11 | - |
| 2012 | You Are My Baby | - | 6 |
| | Awakening | 2 | 1 |
| | A Failed Attempt | 1 | 1 |
| | Dear Death | 1 | 2 |

(*)represents it still on chart

=== Malaysia ===
| Year | Title | 988 |
| 2012 | You Are My Baby | 2 |
| | Awakening | 3 |
| | Wake Up | 7 |
| | Dear Death | 2 |

(*)represents it still on chart
