= Frend =

Frend or FREND may refer to:

== Science ==
- Front-end Robotics Enabling Near-term Demonstration (FREND), a DARPA project to enable grappling older satellites
- Fine-Resolution Epithermal Neutron Detector (FREND), an instrument on the ExoMars Trace Gas Orbiter

== People ==
- William Frend (reformer) (1757–1841), English clergyman, mathematician, social reformer and writer
- Sophia Elizabeth Frend (1809–1892), English writer and social reformer, born into the Frend family
- William Frend De Morgan (1839–1917), English potter, tile designer and novelist
- Charles Frend (1909–1977), English film director and editor
- William Hugh Clifford Frend (1916–2005), English ecclesiastical historian, archaeologist and Anglican priest
- Ted Frend (1916–2006), British motorcycle sports competitor
- George Frend (active 1987–2000), Irish hurling player

== See also ==
- Friend
- Freind
