= Unfriend =

Unfriend refers to the act of ending a friendship. It can also refer to:

== Internet ==
- Defriend from an Internet relationship
- Remove from one's friends list
- Friending and following, a feature on social media sites, predominantly Facebook

== Media ==
=== Film ===
- Friend Request, 2016 German horror film titled Unfriend in Germany
- Unfriend (film), 2014 Philippine film
- Unfriended, 2014 American film
- Unfriended: Dark Web, 2018 American film, sequel to Unfriended

=== Television ===
- "Unfriended" (Elementary), 2019 television episode
- "Unfriended" (Vanderpump Rules), 2020 television episode

== See also ==
- Friend (disambiguation)
