= Freind =

Freind is an obsolete form and modern mis-spelling of friend.

Freind is also a surname, and may refer to:

- Sir John Freind (conspirator) (died 1696), executed English civil servant
- John Freind (physician) (1675–1728), English physician
- John Freind (priest) (1754–1832) English Archdeacon of Armagh
- Robert Freind (1667–1751), English educator
- Stephen Freind (born 1944), American politician
- William Freind (c. 1715 – 1766), Church of England clergyman

== See also ==
- Friend
- Friend (disambiguation)
- Frend (disambiguation)
