= Amico =

Amico may refer to:

== People ==
=== Italians ===
Given name:

- Saint Amico (died c. 1045), the patron saint of the Italian comune San Pietro Avellana
- Amico, O.S.B. Roman Catholic monk, abbot, and cardinal (1117–1130)
- Amico Agnifili (died 1476), Italian Roman Catholic bishop and cardinal
- Amico Aspertini, Italian Renaissance painter and sculptor
- Amico Bignami (1862–1929), Italian physician, pathologist, malariologist and sceptic
- Amico Ricci (1794–1862), Italian art historian and marquess

Surname:

- Antonio Amico (died 1641), Roman Catholic Canon of Palermo
- Bartholomeus Amicus (1562–1649; also Bartolomeo Amico), Jesuit priest, teacher and writer
- Francesco Amico (born 1578), prominent Catholic theologian

=== Other people ===
- Joe Amico (born 1995), American professional soccer player
- Roberto d'Amico (born 1967), Belgian politician
- Vinnie Amico, drummer and member of the American jamband moe
- Leah O'Brien (born 1974; née Amico), American athlete, Olympian, and sports commentator

== Other ==
- Amico (film), a 1949 West German comedy film
- "Amico" (song), a 1980 Italian song
- Azar Motor Industrial Co (AMICO), an Iranian truck manufacturer
- Intellivision Amico, an unreleased video game console

== See also ==
- D'Amico
