= Tres Amigos =

Tres Amigos (Spanish "Three Friends") may refer to:

== Places ==
- Tres Amigos, river in Juan Castro Blanco National Park

== Entertainment ==
- Los Tres Amigos, comic strip by Laerte
- Los Tres Amigos, fictional company in TV series Guiding Light (1980–89)

=== Music ===
- Tres Amigos, album by Los Huracanes del Norte 1995
- Los Tres Amigos, album by Luis Miguel 2005
- "Tres Amigos", song by Astor Piazzolla
- "Tres Amigos", song by Los Huracanes del Norte
- "Tres Amigos", tango by Aníbal Troilo, composed by Enrique Cadícamo
- "Tres Amigos", 1999 single by French-Japanese jazz duo United Future Organization
- Los Tres Amigos, a contemporary latin jazz group formed by Steve Masakowski (guitar), with James Singleton (bass) and Hector Gallardo (bongos)

== Other uses ==
- Tres Amigos, brig captured in 1816 by corsair José Joaquín Almeida

== See also ==
- Tre Amigos, album by Swedish hip hop band Just D
- The Three Caballeros - 1944 Disney film
- Three Amigos (disambiguation)
- Amigo (disambiguation)
