= Avi Schiffmann =

American technologist and entrepreneur

Avi Schiffman
- Born: October 26, 2002 (age 23)
- Occupations: Technologist; entrepreneur
- Years active: 2019–present
- Known for: nCoV2019.live; Ukraine Take Shelter; Friend (AI wearable)

Avi Schiffmann is an American technologist and entrepreneur known for public-interest web projects, including the COVID-19 dashboard nCoV2019.live and the refugee-housing platform Ukraine Take Shelter, and for founding the AI wearables startup Friend. He received the Webby Awards' Person of the Year honor in 2020 for his work tracking the COVID-19 pandemic.

== Career ==
As a high-school student in Washington, Schiffmann launched nCoV2019.live in late 2019 to aggregate COVID-19 case data via automated scraping. The site drew a large global audience early in the pandemic. In 2020 he appeared as a WIRED25 speaker. Schiffmann received the Webby Awards' Person of the Year honor in 2020 for nCoV2019.live; the award was presented by Anthony Fauci.

In March 2022, while a student at Harvard University, he co-created Ukraine Take Shelter, a matching platform for people fleeing Russia's invasion to connect with potential hosts, with Marco Burstein. The project spread internationally. Ukraine Take Shelter was criticized for its verification and safety practices. For example, Polish lawyer Kasia Chojecka said she was concerned about the lack of identity verification (given that the target audience included many children and women) and that the geolocation system was also flawed.

Schiffmann later founded Friend, a consumer AI startup offering neck pendants that record audio for processing and replies via text to the user's phone. The friend.com domain was purchased as part of the brand strategy. Schiffmann spent $1.8 million on the domain, nearly three-quarters of his $2.5 million raised in fundraising. In late 2025, Friend mounted a large New York City Subway ad campaign, which was heavily criticized; many of the advertisements were vandalized. The Atlantic called Schiffmann the "most reviled tech CEO" in New York.

== Projects ==
- nCoV2019.live (2019–2020): pandemic dashboard aggregating global COVID-19 data.
- Ukraine Take Shelter (2022): host–refugee matching site launched during Russia's invasion of Ukraine.
- Friend (2024–): AI companion pendant and related software services.

== Personal life ==
Schiffmann attended Mercer Island High School in Mercer Island, Washington. He was a student at Harvard University for one semester, but dropped out to work on Ukraine Take Shelter after the Russian-Ukraine war began. Schiffmann is Jewish. He lives in San Francisco, California.
