= Access modifiers =

Keywords in object-oriented programming languages

Access modifiers (or access specifiers) are reserved keywords in object-oriented languages that set the accessibility of classes, methods, and other members. Access modifiers are a specific part of programming language syntax used to facilitate the encapsulation of components.

In C++, there are only three access modifiers. C# extends the number of them to six, while Java has four access modifiers, but three keywords for this purpose. In Java, having no keyword before defaults to the package-private modifier.

When the class is declared as public, it is accessible to other classes defined in the same package as well as those defined in other packages. This is the most commonly used specifier for classes. However, a class itself cannot be declared as private. If no access specifier is stated, the default access restrictions will be applied. The class will be accessible to other classes in the same package but will be inaccessible to classes outside the package. When we say that a class is inaccessible, it simply means that we cannot create an object of that class or declare a variable of that class type. The protected access specifier too cannot be applied to a class.

== Names of keywords ==
C++ uses the three modifiers called public, protected, and private. C# has the modifiers public, protected ,internal, private, protected internal, private protected, and file. Java has public, package, protected, and private; package is the default, used if no other access modifier keyword is specified. The meaning of these modifiers may differ from one language to another. A comparison of the keywords, ordered from the most restrictive to the most open, and their meaning in these three languages follows. Their visibility ranges from the same class to the package where the class is defined to a general access permission. Below, the maximal access is written into the table.

In Swift, there are five different access levels relative to both the source file in which the entity is defined and the module containing that source file.

Keyword	C#	C++	Java	Swift
private	class	class and/or friend classes	class	enclosing declaration only + extensions of declaration in same file
fileprivate	-	-	-	same file
file	same file	-	-	-
private protected	derived classes in the same assembly	-	-	-
protected internal	same assembly and/or derived classes	-	-	-
protected	derived classes	derived classes and/or friend classes	derived classes and/or within same package	-
package	-	-	within its package	-
internal	same assembly	-	-	same module
public	everybody	everybody	everybody	everybody
open	-	-	-	everybody + subclass outside module + override outside module

== Example ==
=== C++ ===
import std;

// default access modifier inside struct is public
// default access modifier inside class is private
struct Base {
private:
    int x;
protected:
    // Base::m, Base::n are protected
    int m;
    int n;
public:
    void set_n(int v) noexcept { 
        n = v; 
    }

    void f() { 
        std::println("calling Base::f()");
    }
};
 
// Derived extends Base with public inheritance
struct Derived : public Base {
private:
    using Base::f; // Derived::f is private
public:
    using Base::m; // Derived::m is public

    // Base::n is accessible here, but not outside
    [[nodiscard]]
    int get_n() const noexcept { 
        return n; 
    }

    // ERROR, Base::x is inaccessible here
    // int get_x() const noexcept { 
    //     return x; 
    // }
};
 
int main(int argc, char* argv[]) {
    Derived d;

    // d.x = 2; // ERROR, private
    // d.n = 2; // ERROR, protected
    d.m = 2; // protected Base::m is accessible as Derived::m

    d.set_n(2); // calls Base::set_n(int)
    std::println("{}", d.get_n()); // output: 2

    // d.f(); // ERROR, Base::f is inaccessible as Derived::f

    Base& b = d; // b references d and "views" it as being type Base

    // b.x = 3; // ERROR, private
    // b.n = 3; // ERROR, protected
    // b.m = 3; // ERROR, Base::m is protected

    b.set_n(3); // calls Base::set_n(int)
    // std::println("{}", b.get_n()); // ERROR, 'struct Base' has no member named 'get_n'

    b.f(); // calls Base::f()
    return 0;
}
