= Three Friends =

Three Friends may refer to:

- Three Friends (album), a 1972 album by Gentle Giant
- Three Friends (1913 film), an American short silent Western film
- Three Friends (2024 film), a French romantic comedy-drama film
- Three Friends (TV series), a South Korean drama/sitcom

== See also ==
- Three Amigos (disambiguation)
