= Olympian (automobile) =

Defunct American motor vehicle manufacturer

Olympian Motors Company
- Type: Automobile manufacturer
- Industry: Automotive
- Predecessor: Pontiac Chassis Company
- Founded: 1917; 109 years ago
- Founder: R. A. Palmer
- Defunct: 1920; 106 years ago
- Fate: Sold
- Successor: Friend Motors Corporation
- Headquarters: Pontiac, Michigan, United States
- Products: Automobiles
- Production output: 2,070 (1917-1920)

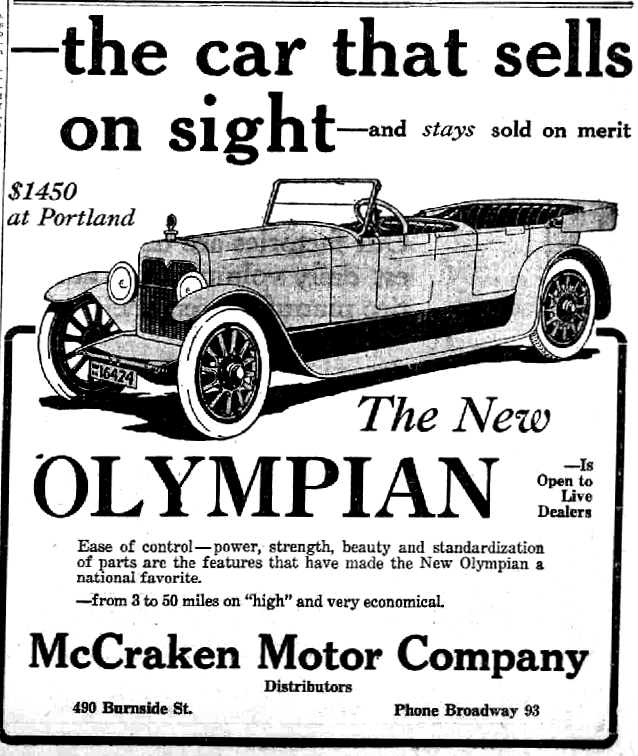
1919 Olympian cars advertisement

The Olympian was an automobile built in Pontiac, Michigan, USA, by the Olympian Motors Company from 1917 to 1921.

== History ==
R. A. Palmer purchased the well equipped Cartercar factory from General Motors to produce a low priced car. Model 37 was a 4-cylinder 23-hp touring car called the Tourist selling for $795 (equivalent to $19,978 in 2025), and a four-seat roadster called the Gypsy selling for $825. The car was given a large selection of colors to distinguish them from competitors.

In 1920, management issues caused the company to be sold to Otis Friend and the Friend automobile would go into production later in 1920.
