= My Friends =

My Friends may refer to:

== Film and television ==
- My Friends (film) (Amici miei), an Italian comedy-drama directed by Mario Monicelli
- "My Friends", an episode of the Indian TV series Dhoom Machaao Dhoom

== Music ==
- My Friends (album), an album by The Wailers
- "My Friends" (Red Hot Chili Peppers song)
- "My Friends" (Stereophonics song)
- "My Friends", a song from the musical Sweeney Todd: The Demon Barber of Fleet Street
- "My Friends", a song by Laura Marling, from the album A Creature I Don't Know

== Literature ==
- My Friends (Matar novel), a 2024 novel by Hisham Matar
- My Friends (Backman novel), a 2025 novel by Fredrik Backman

== See also ==
- My Friend (disambiguation)
- Friends (disambiguation)
