= Amiga (disambiguation) =

Amiga is the name of a series of personal computers.

Amiga is the Portuguese, Spanish, Occitan and Catalan word for "friend" in the feminine, or "female friend".

The word may also refer to:

== Businesses and products ==
- Amiga Corporation, the company that originally developed the Amiga personal computer
  - AmigaOS, the operating system of the Amiga personal computer
  - Commodore-Amiga, Inc., a subsidiary of Commodore International (both now defunct) that developed and marketed the Amiga personal computer
  - Amiga Technologies GmbH, a subsidiary of Escom (both now defunct) that was set up following their purchase of Commodore International in 1996
  - Amiga, Inc. (South Dakota), the original 1997 Gateway subsidiary named Amiga, Inc. (incorporated in the US state of South Dakota)
  - Amiga, Inc., the company incorporated in the US state of Delaware
  - Amiga 1000, the first Amiga computer, originally known simply as the Amiga
- Amiga (record label), a record label that originated in East Germany

== People ==
- Coral Amiga, English actress

== Other uses ==
- Amiga (butterfly), a butterfly in the family Nymphalidae
- Amiga (album)

== See also ==
- Amigo (disambiguation)
- Amica (disambiguation)
- Amicus (disambiguation)
