= Lesson One (album) =

Lesson One 第一課

Studio album by Anthony Neely
- Released: 19 November 2010
- Recorded: November 2010
- Genre: Mandopop
- Length: 48:05
- Label: HIM International Music

Anthony Neely chronology
| – | Lesson One 第一課 (2010) | Wake Up (2012) |

Lesson One (Chinese: 第一課) is the debut studio album released by the Taiwanese singer-songwriter, Anthony Neely, on 19 November 2010 with 11 tracks. The lead single, "Sorry That I Loved You" and the second single, "The Last Embrace" received commercial successes.

== Tracklisting ==
CD

| No. | Title | Lyrics | Music | Arranger(s) | Length |
|---|---|---|---|---|---|
| 1. | "Lesson One" (第一課) | Da-wei Ge; Anthony Neely | Zheng Nan | JerryC | 4:10 |
| 2. | "Sorry That I Loved You" | Skot Suyama | Skot Suyama | Skot Suyama | 3:52 |
| 3. | "Happy Armageddon" (末日快樂) | Xin-yan Chen | Will Peng | Will Peng | 4:16 |
| 4. | "The Last Embrace" (散場的擁抱) | Daryl Yao | Jun-yuan Su | Baby Chung; JerryC | 5:03 |
| 5. | "Fed Up" (不耐煩) | Ge | Skot Suyama | Skot Suyama | 3:31 |
| 6. | "The Little Things" (幸福事小) | Xiao-xie Lan | Michael Lin | Lin | 4:48 |
| 7. | "Brawl" (纏鬥) | Yao | Will Peng; Neely | Will Peng | 4:01 |
| 8. | "Nightmares" (惡夢) | Neely; Derek Shih; Ge | Will Peng | Will Peng | 4:05 |
| 9. | "The Gentleman" (紳士) | Ge | Skot Suyama | Skot Suyama | 4:22 |
| 10. | "Hide Away" (藏起來) | Shi Li | Will Peng | Will Peng | 4:56 |
| 11. | "The Blower's Daughter" | Damien George Rice | Damien George Rice | Will Peng | 5:01 |
| Total length: | | | | | 48:05 |

== Editions ==
Lesson One (Pre-order)(CD+DVD)

With DVD

Lesson One (Standard Version)(CD)

== Awards ==
| Year | Award Show | Category | Nominated work | Result | Ref. |
|---|---|---|---|---|---|
| 2011 | MusicRadio China TOP Ranking Awards | Best Song in Hong Kong and Taiwan | The Last Embrace | Won | |
| 2012 | 17th Singapore Hit Awards | Top 10 Songs | The Last Embrace | Won | |
| 2012 | 12th Malaysia PWH Music Award | Top 10 Original Songs (International) | The Last Embrace | Won | |
