= Mi Amigo =

Mi Amigo (Spanish: My Friend) may refer to:

- MV Mi Amigo a three masted cargo schooner, that later gained international recognition as an offshore radio station
- Mi Amigo memorial, a war memorial at Endcliffe Park, Sheffield, England

== See also ==
- Mi Amigo El Príncipe (My Friend The Prince), studio album by Mexican pop singer Cristian Castro
- Mi amigo Hugo, a Venezuelan television documentary
- Amigo (disambiguation)
- My Friend (disambiguation)
