= Chrysocicada =

Scientific classification
- Kingdom: Animalia
- Phylum: Arthropoda
- Clade: Pancrustacea
- Class: Insecta
- Order: Hemiptera
- Suborder: Auchenorrhyncha
- Superfamily: Cicadoidea
- Family: Cicadidae
- Subfamily: Cicadettinae
- Tribe: Pictilini
- Genus: Chrysocicada; Boulard, 1989

Genus of cicadas

Chrysocicada is a genus of cicadas, also known as aleas, belonging to the family Cicadidae. It is found in north-western Australia.

== Species ==
As of 2025 there were three species:

- Chrysocicada franceaustralae Boulard, 1989 (Broad-headed Alea)
- Chrysocicada inflata Emery & Emery, 2023 (Narrow-headed Alea)
- Chrysocicada trophis Moulds & Marshall, 2022 (Golden Alea)
