= Friends (disambiguation) =

Friends is an American television sitcom first broadcast in 1994.

Friends or The Friends commonly refers to:

- Friendship, an interpersonal relationship between humans
- Quakers, or members of the Religious Society of Friends

Friends or The Friends may also refer to:

== Film ==
- Friends (1912 film), an American film by D. W. Griffith
- Friends (1938 film), a Soviet film by Lev Arnshtam
- Friends (1971 film), a British film with a soundtrack by Elton John and Bernie Taupin
- The Friends (film), a 1971 French film by Gérard Blain
- Friends (1988 film), a Japanese-Swedish film
- Friends (1993 film), a South African film starring Kerry Fox
- Friends (1999 film), an Indian Malayalam film starring Jayaram and Mukesh
- Friends (2001 film), an Indian Tamil film starring Vijay and Suriya
- Friends, a 2002 Indian Kannada film directed by M. D. Sridhar, a remake of the 2001 Indian Telugu film 6 Teens
- Friends (2002 film), a 2002 Indian Telugu film starring Sivaji
- Friends (With Benefits), a 2009 comedy-drama film

== Literature ==
- The Friends (play), 1970, by Arnold Wesker
- Friends: A Love Story, a 2007 non-fiction book by Angela Bassett and Courtney B. Vance with Hilary Beard
- The Friends (novel), 1973, by Rosa Guy

== Music ==
=== Bands ===
- Friends (Swedish band), a sextet who represented Sweden at the Eurovision Song Contest 2001
- Friends (American band), from Brooklyn
- Friends, an American-Australian soft rock trio that was the predecessor to Cotton, Lloyd and Christian
- Friends, a 1980s Dutch band featuring Carola Smit
- Friends, alternative name for Leo de Castro and Friends, a 1970s Australian rock band

=== Albums ===
- Friends (film soundtrack), a 1971 soundtrack by Elton John and Bernie Taupin
- Friends (B'z album) (1992)
- Friends (The Beach Boys album) (1968)
- Friends (Chick Corea album) (1978)
- Friends (Easybeats album) (1969)
- Friends (B. B. King album) (1974)
- Friends (Erina Mano album) (2009)
- Friends (Hugh Masekela and Larry Willis album) (2005)
- Friends (Anthony Neely album) (2013)
- Sakura Gakuin 2011 Nendo: Friends, 2012, by Sakura Gakuin
- Friends (Shalamar album) (1982)
- Friends (Sly and Robbie album) (1998)
- Friends (Dionne Warwick album) (1985)
- Friends (White Lies album) (2016)
- Friends (Omar Apollo EP), 2019
- The Friends EP, a 2007 EP by Ween
- Friends, 1981, by BZN
- Friends, 1983, by Larry Carlton
- Friends, 2004, by Mocca
- Friends, a 1998 EP by Testeagles

=== Songs ===
- "Friends" (Beach Boys song), 1968
- "Friends" (Terry Reid song), 1969
- "Friends" (Led Zeppelin song), 1970
- "Friends" (Elton John song), 1971
- "Friends" (Bette Midler song), 1973
- "Friends" (Razzy Bailey song), 1981
- "Friends" (Amii Stewart song), 1984
- "Friends" (Whodini song), 1984
- "Friends" (Jody Watley song), 1989
- "Friends" (Joe Satriani composition), 1992
- "Friends" (Stella Getz song), 1993
- "Friends" (Scooter song), 1995
- "Friends" (John Michael Montgomery song), 1996
- "Friends" (Aura Dione song), 2012
- "Friends" (Francis and the Lights song), 2016
- "Friends" (Justin Bieber and BloodPop song), 2017
- "Friends" (Marshmello and Anne-Marie song), 2018
- "Friends" (Flume song), 2019
- "Friends" (Monica song), 2022
- "Friends!", by Nami Tamaki, 2009
- "Friends", by 28 Days, from 28 Days, 1998
- "Friends", by Adam & The Ants, from the EP The B-Sides, 1982
- "Friends", by Backyard Babies, from Stockholm Syndrome, 2003
- "Friends", by Barry Manilow, from Barry Manilow, 1973
- "Friends", by Blake Shelton from If I'm Honest, 2016
- "Friends", by BTS, from Map of the Soul: 7, 2020
- "Friends", by The Carters, from Everything Is Love, 2018
- "Friends", by Dido, from Still on My Mind, 2019
- "Friends", by Faster Pussycat, from Whipped!, 1992
- "Friends", by Gentle Giant, from Giant for a Day!, 1978
- "Friends", by Hustle Gang, from We Want Smoke, 2017
- "Friends", by Hyper Potions, main theme of the video game Sonic Mania, 2017
- "Friends", by J. Cole, from KOD, 2018
- "Friends", by The Japanese House, from In the End It Always Does, 2023
- "Friends", by Matchbox Twenty, from Where the Light Goes, 2023
- "Friends", by Meghan Trainor, from Thank You, 2016
- "Friends", by Michael W. Smith, from Michael W. Smith Project, 1983
- "Friends", by Nas and Damien Marley from Distant Relatives, 2010
- "Friends", by Pat Boone, from Departure, 1969
- "Friends", by The Police, from the single "Don't Stand So Close to Me", 1980
- "Friends", by Rain, from Rain's World, 2006
- "Friends", by Raven-Symoné, from That's So Raven Too!, 2006
- "Friends", by Sakura Gakuin, from Sakura Gakuin 2011 Nendo: Friends, 2012
- "Friends", by Toby Fox from Deltarune Chapters 3+4 OST from the video game Deltarune, 2025
- "Friends", by Tubeway Army, from Tubeway Army, 1978
- "Friends", by Ween, from La Cucaracha, 2007
- "Friends", by Why Don't We, from 8 Letters, 2018
- "Friends", by Whodini, from Escape, 1984

== Television ==
- Friends (1979 TV series), an American kids-oriented drama
- Friends (2002 TV series), a South Korean-Japanese drama
- Friends (2012 TV series), a Polish drama series
- Friends (2021 TV series), a South Korean reality show
- The Friends (TV series), a South Korean series
- "Friends" (The Upper Hand), a 1996 episode
- "Friends" (Matlock), a 2025 episode

== Other uses ==
- Friends (ship), a 1779 convict transport ship
- Friends (collage), a 2011 mixed media collage by India Cruse-Griffin
- Friends (smart speaker), developed by Naver Corporation and Line Corporation
- Friends Arena, the former name of Strawberry Arena in Stockholm, Sweden
- Friends FM, a radio station in Kolkata, India
- Friends Hospital, a hospital in Philadelphia, Pennsylvania
- Friends University, a university in Wichita, Kansas
- Friends-International, a NGO aid foundation
- Friends, members in the Two by Twos house churches

== See also ==
- Friend (disambiguation)
- Friendship (disambiguation)
- List of Friends schools
- My Friends (disambiguation)
