= Friend (given name) =

Friend is the given name of:

- Friend Humphrey (1787–1854), American politician
- Friend Richardson (1865–1943), American newspaper publisher and politician, 25th governor of California
- Friend Smith Rutherford (1824–1864), United States Army officer and lawyer
