= Azar Motor Industrial Co =

Azar Motor Industrial CO (AMICO)
- Type: Private
- Industry: Automotive
- Founded: 1989
- Headquarters: Jolfa (Jolfa County), East Azerbaijan province, Iran
- Products: Heavy & light trucks & pick up trucks
- Website: www.amicoir.com (in Persian) amicoir.com/en/ (in English)

Azar Motor Industrial Co or AMICO (Persian: گروه صنعتی آميكو) is an Iranian truck manufacturer established in 1989 and located in Jolfa near Tabriz. This company produces light and heavy diesel vehicles.

AzarMotor Industrial Company, known as AMICO, was founded fully by the private sector and as a family business in 1989. Aras Khodro Diesel (AMICO- reg no. 59) is a subsidiary of the AMICO Industrial Group.

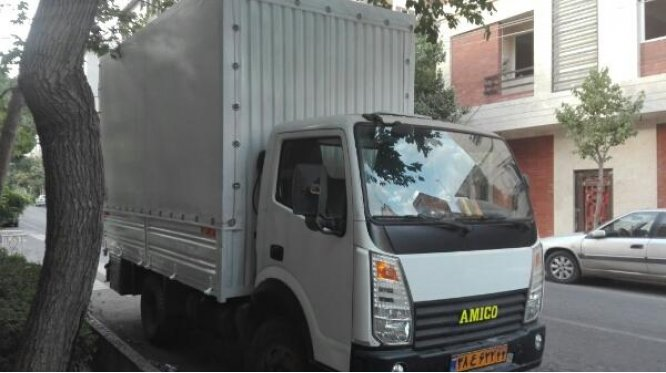
Amico medium-duty truck

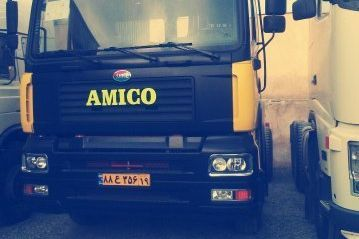
Amico heavy truck
