= Front-end Robotics Enabling Near-term Demonstration =

The Front-end Robotics Enabling Near-term Demonstration (FREND, a play on friend) is a DARPA project "aiming to create a fully autonomous docking capability for satellites that weren't built to be serviced", currently under testing at the U.S. Naval Research Laboratory Spacecraft Engineering Department.

The FREND mission concept uses robotic arms to position a grappling tool at a customer spacecraft structural hardpoint, and docks the two spacecraft together by first rigidizing this tool, then rigidizing the positioning robotics. FREND has been described as a robotic manipulator technology "that someday could potentially deliver fuel, provide repairs, or reposition satellites."
