= Amicus Bank =

Canada-based bank

- Industry: Banking
- Founded: 1999
- Defunct: 2003
- Fate: Dissolved into the Canadian Imperial Bank of Commerce
- Headquarters: Toronto, Ontario
- Areas served: Canada and the United States
- Key people: Brian Cassidy (CEO)
- Website: amicusbank.ca

Amicus Bank was a wholly owned subsidiary of Canadian Imperial Bank of Commerce (CIBC) which provided non-traditional banking to customers.

== Canadian operations ==
Within Canada, Amicus Bank was primarily responsible for operating President's Choice Financial's retail banking operations, excluding credit cards. Amicus Bank briefly provided services under its own name through Bell Sympatico's portal. It also took on the operation of non-branch automated banking machines (primarily stand-alone ABMs at services stations, convenience stores) which were co-branded for Amicus Bank and CIBC.

The bank asked for and received approval from the Minister of Finance for voluntary dissolution in 2002. Services operated by Amicus Bank were subsequently provided by the direct banking division of CIBC. President's Choice Financial banking services were then rebranded Simplii Financial after CIBC dissolved its partnership with Loblaw Companies in 2017.

Amicus Bank had 1100 employees in Canada and the US. XtraCash ATM Incorporated (founded 1998) was acquired under Amicus FSB in 2001.

== US operations ==
Amicus had an American unit, Amicus FSB (Amicus Federal Savings Bank), which was formed in 2000 and has since ceased operations due to cancellation of joint ventures south of the border. Amicus FSB partnered with Safeway grocery stores in western US states (California, Colorado) and Florida, doing business as Safeway SELECT Bank with 161 locations, and partnered with Winn-Dixie in Florida, doing business as Marketplace Bank (CIBC National) with 185 locations. Amicus set up banking kiosks where customers could make deposits, apply for loans, and withdraw money. The US unit ceased operation at the end of November 2002 with customers with certificate of deposit transferred over to E-Trade Bank. Amicus FSB filed with the Federal Deposit Insurance Corporation for voluntary liquidation and closing with operations ceasing on September 29, 2003.

== Key people ==
- Brian Cassidy, CEO of Amicus Bank; now retired
- Gary Gray, President of Amicus FSB - Western Division - later became Executive VP of Retail Banking with Umpqua Bank
