= Amica (cicada) =

Scientific classification
- Kingdom: Animalia
- Phylum: Arthropoda
- Clade: Pancrustacea
- Class: Insecta
- Order: Hemiptera
- Suborder: Auchenorrhyncha
- Family: Cicadidae
- Subfamily: Cicadettinae
- Tribe: Pictilini
- Genus: Amica; Moulds & Marshall, 2025

Genus of cicadas

Amica is a genus of cicadas in the family Cicadidae, subfamily Cicadettinae and tribe Pictilini. It is native to Australia. It was described in 2025 by Australian entomologists Maxwell Sydney Moulds and David C. Marshall.

== Species ==
As of 2025 there were two valid species in the genus:

- Amica glauca Moulds & Marshall, 2025 (Bluebush Cicada)
- Amica sitis Moulds & Marshall, 2025 (Woomera Green Friendly)
