= Three Amigos (disambiguation) =

Three Amigos is a 1986 American comedy film.

Three Amigos also may refer to:

- The Three Amigos (band), from the UK
- The Three Amigos Campaign, animated announcements promoting safe sex
- The Three Amigos, a "Specification Workshop" in behavior-driven development
- North American Leaders' Summit, commonly known as the "Three Amigos Summit", semi-regular trilateral meetings between the leaders of Canada, Mexico, and the United States.
- The prominent Mexican film directors Guillermo del Toro, Alfonso Cuarón, and Alejandro Iñárritu are often referred to as the Three Amigos of Cinema.
- "The Three Amigos," a nickname for the band Iron Maiden's three-guitar line-up
- ”The Three Amigos,” a nickname for the friendship between John McCain, Lindsey Graham, and Joe Lieberman

== See also ==
- Tres Amigos (disambiguation)
- Tre Amigos, a 1993 album by Swedish hip hop group Just D
- The Three Caballeros, 1944 Disney film
- Three Comrades, Remarque novel and film
- Three Friends (disambiguation)
