= Friend (automobile) =

Automobile manufactured in Pontiac, Michigan

The Friend was an automobile manufactured in Pontiac, Michigan, by the Friend Motors Corporation in 1920. Otis Friend had taken over the Olympian Motor Company in 1920, and manufactured their car until the car named after himself was ready. The Friend was shown at the New York Automobile Show in January 1921, featured a four-cylinder engine, a 112-inch (2842mm) wheelbase, and had a five-seater, two-door roadster body. Wooden artillery and wire wheels were options. The Friend originally sold for $1585. With sales sluggish, the price was reduced further to $1185, but this had no effect, and production ended with fewer than fifty cars built. A six-cylinder model was planned, but the company went out of business before any were manufactured.
