= My Friend =

My Friend may refer to:

== Film ==
- My Friend (film), a 1983 Bolivian film
- My Friend, a 1974 Indian film featuring Tun Tun

== Music ==
=== Albums ===
- My Friend (Neil Sedaka album) or the title song (see below), 1986
- My Friend (SG Wannabe album), 2008

=== Songs ===
- "My Friend" (Eddie Fisher song), 1954
- "My Friend" (Groove Armada song), 2001
- "My Friend" (Jacques Houdek song), 2017
- "My Friend" (Oblivia song), 2000
- "My Friend" (Zard song), 1996
- "My Friend", by Bradley Joseph from The Journey Continues, 2003
- "My Friend", by Chungha, 2020
- "My Friend", by Jimi Hendrix from The Cry of Love, 1971
- "My Friend", by Neil Sedaka from In the Pocket, 1980
- "My Friend", by Royce da 5'9" from Rock City, 2002
- "My Friend", by Spirit from The Adventures of Kaptain Kopter & Commander Cassidy in Potato Land, 1981
- "My Friend", from the musical The Life, 1990
- "My Friend (So Long)", by DC Talk from Supernatural, 1998

== See also ==
- My Friends (disambiguation)
- Mi Amigo (disambiguation)
- Mo Chara (lit. "My Friend"), Irish rapper, activist and actor
