= ¡Amigos! =

- Arrested Development episode
- Michael (right) meets with Lucille (left) and Gene Parmesan (middle) to discuss George Sr.'s whereabouts.
- Episode no.: Season 2 Episode 3
- Directed by: Lee Shallat Chemel
- Written by: Brad Copeland
- Cinematography by: Greg Harrington
- Editing by: Robert Bramwell
- Production code: 2AJD03
- Original air date: November 21, 2004
- Running time: 22 minutes

Guest appearances
- Martin Mull as Gene Parmesan; Malik Yoba as Ice; Mo Collins as Starla; Mae Whitman as Ann Veal; Judy Greer as Kitty Sanchez; B.W. Gonzalez as Lupe; Justin Lee as Annyong

Episode chronology
← Previous "The One Where They Build a House"	Next → "Good Grief"
- Arrested Development season 2

"¡Amigos!" is the third episode of the second season of the American television satirical sitcom Arrested Development. It was written by producer Brad Copeland and directed by Lee Shallat Chemel. It originally aired on the Fox Network in the United States on November 21, 2004.

The series, narrated by Ron Howard, follows the Bluths, a formerly wealthy, dysfunctional family, who made their money from property development. In the episode, Lucille hires a private investigator, who locates George Sr. in Mexico. Michael goes to collect his father, accompanied by George Michael and his girlfriend, Ann, who Michael heavily dislikes. Gob hires a bounty hunter named Ice to keep tabs on Michael, and comes to terms with the fact that he has no friends. Concurrently, Buster escapes his army duty by fleeing to Mexico, but ends up only several minutes away from the house.

The episode contains the first appearance of reoccurring character Gene Parmesan, who was named after a man writer Barbie Adler had seen in a school documentary's credits years prior. Jessica Walter expressed that she enjoyed filming her scenes of squealing whenever she saw Gene, and series creator Mitchell Hurwitz stated in an interview that he had regrets about not utilizing the episode's hand-shaped chair—which foreshadowed Buster's later loss of a hand—in a more impactful way.

Since airing, "¡Amigos!" has received critical acclaim and has been labeled as one of the series' finest episodes. It has received scholarly analysis since its release, with much of it going towards Buster and his time working in his new Mexican lifestyle.

== Plot ==
Michael (Jason Bateman) speaks with Gob (Will Arnett), his brother and president of the Bluth Company, about business, and mentions his plans to vacation with his son George Michael (Michael Cera) over the weekend. A jealous Gob lies about staying with friends, to which Michael suggests that he has no friends. The family matriarch, Lucille (Jessica Walter), informs Michael that her private investigator, Gene Parmesan (Martin Mull), has found the whereabouts of the family's fugitive patriarch, George Sr. (Jeffrey Tambor), in Mexico, telling Michael to go. Gob overhears, thinking Michael is escaping to Mexico to ditch the business, and hires a bounty hunter, Ice (Malik Yoba), to track Michael.

Michael's sister Lindsay (Portia de Rossi)—who is secretly trying to cheat on her husband with Ice—and niece Maeby (Alia Shawkat) join the Mexico trip, as do George Michael and his girlfriend, Ann (Mae Whitman), whom Michael refuses to get to know. His brother, Buster (Tony Hale), does not wish to follow through on his pledge to join the army and hides in Michael's trunk in hopes of escaping his duty. However, instead of going to Mexico, Buster gets out several minutes from the house, where Lucille's housekeeper, Lupe (B.W. Gonzalez), lives, and he joins her in working, believing he is in Mexico. Ice follows Michael's car to Mexico; Michael and company find Ice and, after explaining the situation, hire him to look for George Sr.—not realizing that George Sr.'s funeral is underway in a nearby church.

Michael leaves with Maeby, as do Lindsay and George Michael, accidentally leaving Ann behind. After realizing this, Michael and an angered George Michael drive back to Mexico. They find her sitting on a park bench, and Gob confronts Michael. The two clear up the situation, and Gob confesses that he has no friends. Michael says he feels he himself has no friends since George Michael spent his day with Ann, and Gob tells him he has to let his son grow up. Michael pays Gene and Ice to be Gob's friend, and agrees to get to know Ann, which only makes him dislike her more. Buster continues doing housework and walks in on Lucille having sex with her brother-in-law, Oscar (Tambor), realizing he is not in Mexico.

== Production ==
"¡Amigos!" was directed by Lee Shallat Chemel and written by producer Brad Copeland. It was Copeland's fourth writing credit, and the third episode of the season to be filmed.

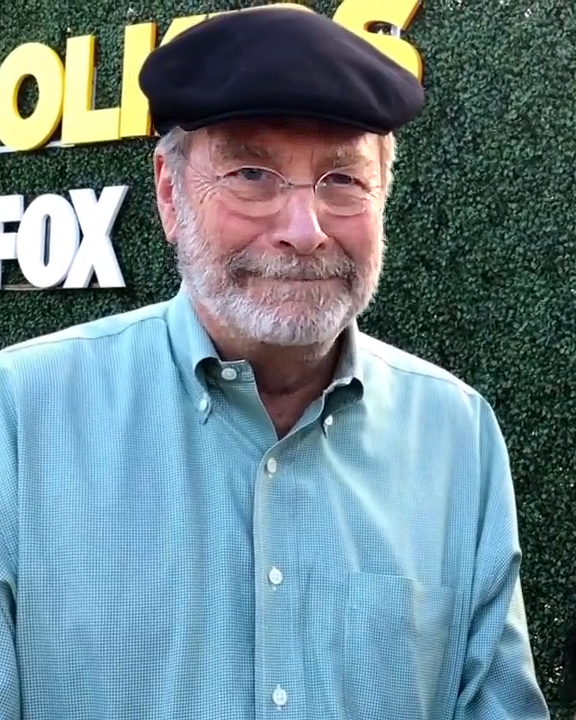
"¡Amigos!" marks the first appearance of Martin Mull as Gene Parmesan.

The episode introduced Martin Mull as Gene Parmesan, who would go on to appear in several other episodes. Gene's name came from writer Barbie Adler, who took it from a documentary Adler had seen in high school; during the documentary's credits, the name appeared, and Adler retained it years after the fact. "¡Amigos!" is the third consecutive episode of the season to have its title reference the sitcom Friends. Talking about his experience as Ice on Arrested Development, Malik Yoba said in an interview that he enjoyed his time on the show, but did not find it to adequately fit what he was looking for in a role.

Jessica Walter later remarked that she enjoyed filming her scenes of Lucille squealing in joy whenever she saw Gene, noting that she felt Mull was "cute". She expressed that she thought the scene humanized Lucille, showing that she isn't as villainous as she seems, and is inherently "girly" in her demeanor. When discussing how he approached foreshadowing Buster's later loss of a hand, series creator Mitchell Hurwitz expressed regret in not doing more with the hand-shaped chair. He claims that his inability to think of any other ways to foreshadow it was the cause of similarly underused gags.

== Themes and analysis ==
The episode gives a much more direct approach to foreshadowing Buster's hand being bitten off, as noted by author Lauren Bratslavsky, when he remarks that he "never thought [he'd] miss a hand so much" upon finding the hand-shaped chair. She uses this as an example of how the series is able to "weave" loosely related storylines together by obscure details that later only become gags when the viewer is already aware of the event it is foreshadowing. Lucille, despite often seeming self-centered and aggravated, wishes to receive praise and validation from those around her, as claimed by author Edwin Demper in his assessment of the episode and the series as a whole. Demper uses Gene Parmesan to exemplify this, as he often gives her small moments of praise during his few appearances, which only makes her admire him more.

An aspect of Buster's character rarely explored, his expertise in cartography, is challenged by his oblivious understanding of distance and Mexican culture in the episode. Despite barely going anywhere, he still thinks he has gone to Mexico, and only believes so because of the "Mexican sun", as he describes it, showing how his preconceived notions of Mexican life warp his views on what is otherwise a simple misunderstanding. Buster even refers to him and his fellow workers as "slave buddies", showing how bound to false stereotypes he is; author J. Jeremy Wisnewski notes that this likely comes from his upbringing, where he saw Lupe—his housekeeper, and the only Mexican person he ever knew in his childhood—be confined to the kitchen daily. Racism and bigotry are common themes of "¡Amigos!", as evidenced by Buster believing that he can simply transition into a Mexican way of life, falsely suggesting there is something that differentiates Americans from Mexicans in terms of how they function in society. However, it may not be inherently racist, as Buster isn't intentional in his misguided view of different cultures. As noted by Tyler Shores, the comical misunderstanding of the episode is aided by Ron Howard's narration, giving a sense of certainty and a vessel to explain situations and their consequences to the audience.

Ice is a rare minority character in Arrested Development whose race is almost never used as part of a joke, and is instead bound by his relevance to the narrative and character development. Unlike characters like Carl Weathers, he "tears down" racial stereotypes through his commonly shown softer side; despite his tough exterior, he lists party planning as his real passion in life, and he shamelessly talks about how he lives near Legoland. Author Carter Soles claims that Buster wanting to escape to Mexico continues the subtle television trope of privileged men trying to have a hard work day for once in their lives, but not understanding what exactly constitutes as real work due to their lavish lifestyle. Buster likens his work to that of a slave, showing that his place of privilege and social mobility has warped his views on the working class. The episode subtly foreshadows "Good Grief", the following episode, according to author Dustin Freeley, when Lucille refers to Buster's genitalia as "Charlie Browns"; this is likened to how "Good Grief" makes heavy use of Peanuts references.

== Release ==
"¡Amigos!" was first broadcast on November 21, 2004, on the Fox Network at 8:30 p.m. Eastern Standard Time in the United States. The episode was watched by 5.89 million viewers during its original airing. It received a 2.1% share among adults between the ages of 18 and 49, meaning that it was seen by 2.1% of all households in that demographic. It was the 76th most-watched broadcast of the week, starting on November 15 and ending on November 21, behind a rerun of The Golden Girls, but ahead of The Simple Life. It marked a decrease of over 1 million viewers from the previous episode, "The One Where They Build a House", which had earned a 2.6% rating, drew in 7.22 million viewers, and was tied with Dateline as the 60th highest rated program of its respective week.

The episode was first released on home video in the United States on October 11, 2005, in the Complete Second Season DVD box set. It includes a deleted scene from the episode, which follows Buster's time in the trunk of the car, cataloguing his hunger and thirst.

== Reception ==
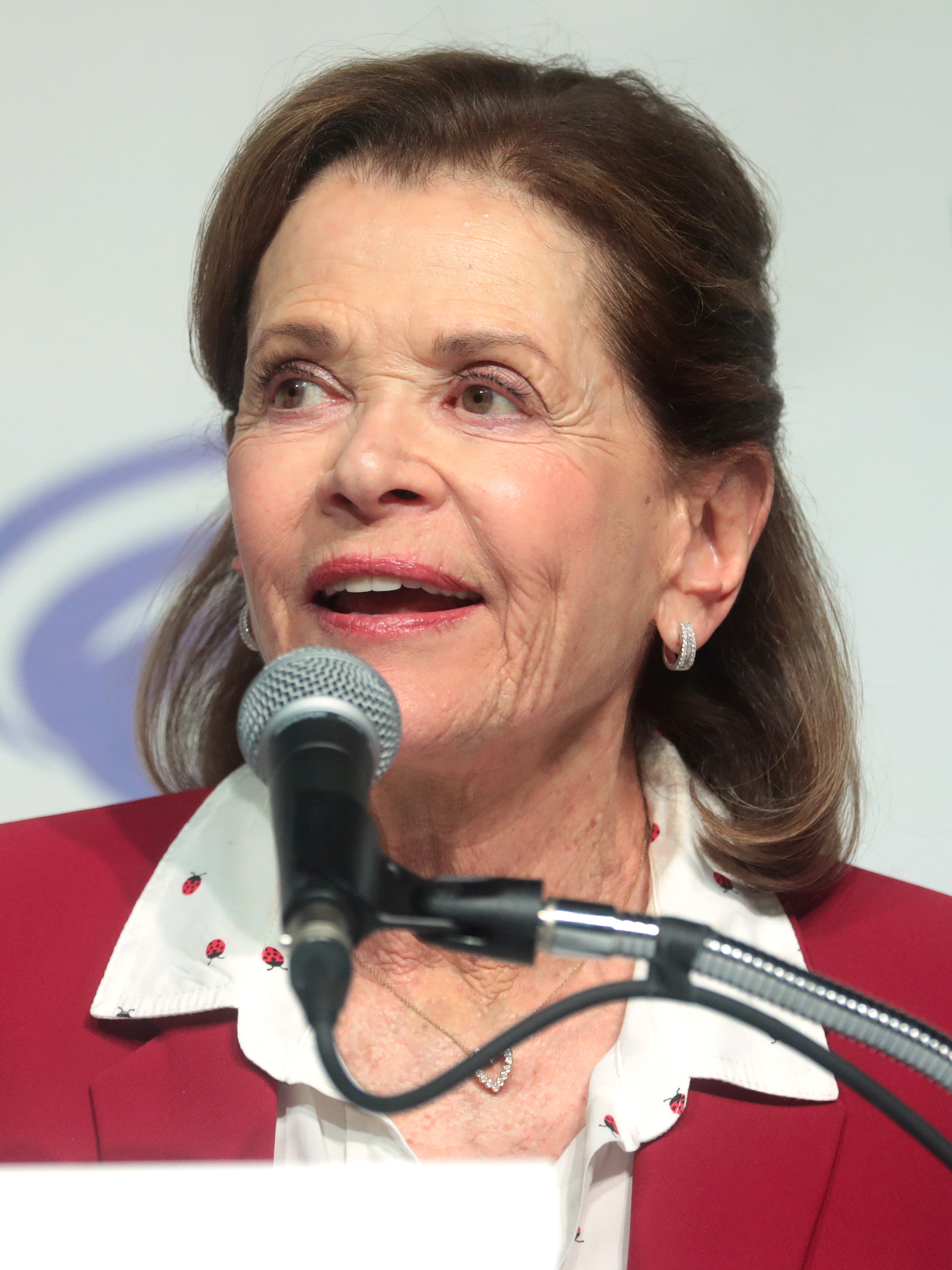
Jessica Walter received notable recognition for her scenes with Gene Parmesan.

Since its release, "¡Amigos!" has received critical acclaim. The A.V. Club writer Noel Murray lauded the episode, finding it to include some of Arrested Development's best visual gags—such as the scenes with Gene Parmesan, where Murray also highlights Walter's acting—also noting it to have more quality Ann-related jokes than usual. Murray highlights the episode's social commentary through Buster's plot and the humor within it. The episode's use of the entire cast was praised by Chad Collins of SlashFilm, who felt it was an example of how different the series was during its original run and its Netflix revival. Despite feeling it was "low-stakes", Collins still felt its chaotic nature was to the episode's benefit. Television writer Mike Scollins listed Tobias's scene of talking to Michael and saying the line, "Your wife is dead" as his favorite Arrested Development moment, calling it "awful", yet "funny" for joking about a topic as taboo as a dead spouse. Similarly, Nicole Drespel, another writer, wrote that the gag of Lucille being overly excited for Gene every time she sees him was "perfect", mainly for being contradictory to Lucille's previous characterization, and because of Walter's acting.

In 2019, Brian Tallerico from Vulture ranked the episode as the 14th best of the whole series, listing the visit to Mexico and Buster's escape in the car trunk as its greatest aspect. He notes that Ann being left in Mexico adequately caps off the "very funny" episode. "¡Amigos!" was listed as the tenth best episode of the series by IGN, finding Michael calling Ann "Ann Hog" to be the highlight line, as well as noting the sub-plot of Buster thinking he's escaped to Mexico as "complet[ing]" the narrative. Collider's S.K. Sapiano wrote that the episode's many absurdist scenarios and satisfying use of every character proved it to be up to par with the rest of the series' best.
