= Amigos de las Américas =

Non-profit organization based in Houston

Amigos de las Americas
- Founder: Guy Bevil Jr.
- Purpose: A world where each young person becomes a life-long catalyst for social change
- Location: Houston, Texas
- Region served: Latin America
- Key people: Sara Nathan, President and CEO
- Volunteers: Over 28,000
- Formerly called: Amigos de Honduras

Amigos de las Américas (literally "Friends of the Americas"), or AMIGOS, is a nonprofit organization based in Houston with 25 chapters across the US. The Vision of AMIGOS is "A world where each young person becomes a life-long catalyst for social change." AMIGOS works towards this vision by inspiring and building young leaders through collaborative community development and immersion in cross-cultural experiences.

== History ==
AMIGOS was founded in 1965 when 29-year-old Guy Bevil Jr., youth pastor at River Oaks Baptist Church in Houston led a team of 181 teenagers and young adults to Honduras to administer polio vaccinations. The group took donations of supplies, recruited 36 doctors, and practiced administering vaccines in Houston. Many participants made the 1,500-mile trip by truck in order to ship the supplies into rural Honduras. The first summer in Honduras, volunteers inoculated over half a million people.

Upon their arrival home, Bevil and his group founded Amigos de Honduras, which grew to be Amigos de las Américas within the next year. Over half of the original participants applied to return the next summer. For the following two decades, AMIGOS focused primarily on administering vaccinations.

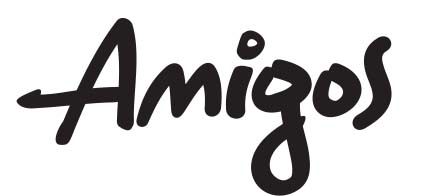

AMIGOS has expanded to many different countries including Brazil, Costa Rica, Colombia, Ecuador, Guatemala, Nicaragua, Panama, Paraguay, Uruguay, The Dominican Republic, Mexico, and Peru, though some countries do not currently have active projects.

Other founders recognized by AMIGOS are H. Kirby Atwood, Sr., Searcy Bracewell, Raymond Cook, Ed Frank, Jr., Carlos R. Hamilton, MD, Victor Huvelle, Mariann and John Marshall, Ed Morris, and Wilson J. Pais.

== Today ==
Amigos de las Américas is a non-religious, non-governmental, non-profit organization based out of Houston. AMIGOS offers summer and gap year programs for people aged 13–25. After extensive training in the US, participants travel to Latin America where they live for anywhere between two weeks to nine months with a host family in a small community.

Participants are partnered with one or two other participants to carrying out health, education, and environmental programs, ranging from latrine construction to formation of youth groups to teaching environmental sustainability and dental hygiene. The programs are carried out in partnership with partner agencies, which have included Save the Children, Plan International, and the governments of the various countries above. Asset-based community development is at the core of AMIGOS projects.

Each year, roughly 600 young people take part in AMIGOS various Latin American programs. Over 28,000 people have participated in the program since it began.

== Program organization ==
The National Office of AMIGOS is still located in Houston and employs a small staff year-round to manage the programs. Sara Nathan is President and CEO.

AMIGOS encourages returning project participants to take leadership roles within the organization. Each project (generally organized geographically and thematically) is led by a Project Director, who is aided by an Associate Project Director. Senior Project Supervisors and Project Supervisors oversee individual community projects and act as liaisons between Project Leadership Teams and participants in community. Alumni can also stay active by joining a local chapter board.

== The Community Impact Project ==
The summer of 2020 was affected significantly by COVID-19. In response, Amigos de las Américas created a six-week online experience for young people to obtain the benefits of a traditional experience while also benefiting their community. In groups of 8-12 students from both the U.S. and Latin America, participants connect with other students and still are able to participate in a cross-cultural exchange.

=== Chapters ===
State	City
Arizona	Phoenix
Arizona	Tucson
California	East Bay
California	Marin
California	Peninsula
California	Sacramento
California	San Diego
California	Santa Clara
California	San Francisco
Colorado	Denver
DC	Washington
Illinois	Chicago North
Illinois	Urban Chicago
Kansas/Missouri	Kansas City
Massachusetts	Boston
Minnesota	Minneapolis/St. Paul
New Mexico	Albuquerque
New York	New York City
Ohio	Kent
Oregon	Portland
Texas	Austin
Texas	Houston
Utah	Salt Lake City
Washington	Seattle
Wisconsin	Madison
