= Friends (Anthony Neely album) =

Studio album by Anthony Neely
- Released: 8 October 2013
- Recorded: 2013
- Genre: Mandopop
- Length: 43:32
- Label: HIM International Music
- Producer: See Tracklist

Anthony Neely chronology
Wake Up (2012)	Friends (2013)

Friends is the third studio album from Anthony Neely. The album was available for pre-order on 28 September 2013 and was released on 8 October. Its lead single is "Everything is Because of Love" and its second lead single is "I am Your ..."

== Tracklisting ==
No.	Title	Lyrics	Music	Length
1.	"Everything is Because of Love" (一切都是因為愛)	Xin-yan Chen	Jun-wei Zhangjian	4:02
2.	"I am Your..." (我是你的)	Albert Leung	Xiao-jian Yan	3:34
3.	"Goin' Home" (想回家)	Chen; Peng	Will Peng	5:08
4.	"Keep In Touch" (見外)	Chen	Zi-pu Yang	4:06
5.	"Death to Sleep" (死不睡覺)	Neely	Anthony Neely; Skot Suyama	4:29
6.	"Faithball" (汗水的重量)	Jian-zhou Huang	Skot Suyama	3:40
7.	"The Medicine Man" (療傷歌手)	Phang	Percy Phang	4:46
8.	"3rd Person" (第三人稱)	Da-wei Ge	Wen-ho Wei	4:50
9.	"For The Shadow" (影子)	Neely; Jun-hua Lin; APE	Peng	5:58
10.	"All My Love"	Neely	Neely; Skot Suyama	4:02
Total length:				43:32

== Edition ==
- Standard Version

== MVs ==
Title	Director	Date	Channel	Note
Faithball	-	18 February 2013	Youtube	
Everything is Because of Love	Jude Chen	25 September 2013	Youtube	
I Am Your...	Tien-yu Fu	13 October 2013	Youtube	
3rd Person	Tien-yu Fu	28 October 2013	Youtube	
Death to Sleep	Jing-yu Zhang	24 December 2013	Youtube	
Goin' Home	Anthony Neely	3 February 2014	Youtube	

== Chart performance ==
=== Taiwan ===
Year	Title	幽浮	Hito	MTV
2013	Everything is Because of Love	5	4	9
	I am Your...	3	8	8
	3rd Person	12	-	-

(*) represents the song is still on chart
**Bold**represents the top-charting song

=== Hong Kong ===
Year	Title	903	TVB	997	RTHK
2013	Everything is Because of Love	-	6 (TVB8)	-	-
	I Am Your...	-	-	2 (Metro Mandarin)	-

(*) represents the song is still on chart
**Bold**represents the top-charting song

=== Singapore ===
Year	Title	YES933
2013	Faithball	2
	Everything is Because of Love	**1**
2014	The Medicine Man	6

(*) represents the song is still on chart
**Bold**represents the top-charting song

=== Malaysia ===
Year	Title	988
2013	Faithball	5
	Everything is Because of Love	11
	Death to Sleep	19
2014	3rd Person	20

(*) represents the song is still on chart
**Bold**represents the top-charting song
