= Rafiki =

Rafiki may refer to:

- Cheeki Rafiki, English sailing yacht
- Rafiki, a mandrill in The Lion King
- Rafiki (film), 2018 Kenyan film
- Rafiki Fariala (born 1997), Congolese film director
- Rafiki Saïd (born 2000), Comorian footballer
