= Friend function =

In object-oriented programming, a friend function, that is a "friend" of a given class, is a function that is given the same access as methods to private and protected data.

A friend function is declared by the class that is granting access, so friend functions are part of the class interface, like methods. Friend functions allow alternative syntax to use objects, for instance f(x) instead of x.f(), or g(x, y) instead of x.g(y). Friend functions have the same implications on encapsulation as methods.

A similar concept is that of friend class.

== Use cases ==
This approach may be used in friendly function when a function needs to access private data in objects from two different classes. This may be accomplished in two similar ways:

- A function of global or namespace scope may be declared as friend of both classes.
- A method of one class may be declared as friend of another one.

// C++ implementation of friend functions.
import std;
 
// Forward declaration of class Foo in order for example to compile.
class Foo;

class Bar {
private:
    int a = 0;
public:
    // Definition of a method of Bar; this is a friend of Foo
    void show(Bar& x, Foo& y) {
        std::println("Show via function member of Bar");
        std::println("Bar::a = {}", x.a);
        std::println("Foo::b = {}", y.b);
    }

    friend void show(Bar& x, Foo& y); // declaration of global function as friend
};
 
class Foo {
private:
    int b = 6;
public: 
    friend void show(Bar& x, Foo& y); // declaration of global function as friend
    friend void Bar::show(Bar& x, Foo& y); // declaration of friend from other class
};
 
// Friend for Bar and Foo, definition of global function
void show(Bar& x, Foo& y) {
    std::println("Show via global function");
    std::println("Bar::a = {}", x.a);
    std::println("Foo::b = {}", y.b);
}
 
int main() {
    Bar a;
    Foo b;
 
    show(a, b);
    a.show(a, b);
}
