= Mount Friendship =

Mountain peak in Himachal Pradesh, India

Coordinates: 32.396°N 77.103°E

Mount Friendship, also called Friendship Peak, is a mountain summit in Manali town of Kullu district of Himachal Pradesh, India on an altitude of 5,287 metres (17,346 ft) above sea level.
