= Friendship, New Jersey =

Populated place in Salem County, New Jersey, US

- Unincorporated community
- Friendship's location in Salem County (Inset: Salem County in New Jersey) Friendship, New Jersey (New Jersey) Friendship, New Jersey (the United States)
- Coordinates: 39°37′20″N 75°10′57″W
- Country: United States
- State: New Jersey
- County: Salem
- Township: Upper Pittsgrove
- Elevation: 131 ft (40 m)
- Time zone: UTC−05:00 (Eastern (EST))
  - Summer (DST): UTC−04:00 (EDT)
- GNIS feature ID: 876522

Friendship is an unincorporated community located within Upper Pittsgrove Township in Salem County, in the U.S. state of New Jersey. It is located approximately 1.3 mi (2.1 km) west of Monroeville.

The community is the site of Friendship United Methodist Church.
