= Bartholomeus Amicus =

Jesuit priest and teacher

Bartholomeus Amicus (born in Anzi, Basilicata; 1562–1649), or Bartolomeo Amico or Bartholomeo d'Amici, was a Jesuit priest, teacher and writer who spent his adult life in Naples. The subjects he wrote about include Aristotelian philosophy, mathematics, astronomy, and the concept of vacuum and its relationship with God.

He studied law before joining the Jesuits and following the curriculum in their college in Naples, later teaching logic, physics, metaphysics and theology. In his extensive writing, he presented alternative theories, including those of Christopher Clavius and Copernicus, even when he disagreed with them, though theologians of that period did not always explain opposing views. He sought to establish workable science without undermining theology.

== See also ==
- List of Roman Catholic scientist-clerics

== Bibliography ==
- Carlo Caterini, Gens Catherina de terra Balii, Rende, Edizioni Scientifiche Calabresi, 2009.
