= Pictilini =

Scientific classification
- Kingdom: Animalia
- Phylum: Arthropoda
- Clade: Pancrustacea
- Class: Insecta
- Order: Hemiptera
- Suborder: Auchenorrhyncha
- Family: Cicadidae
- Subfamily: Cicadettinae
- Tribe: Pictilini; Moulds & Hill, 2018

Tribe of true bugs

Pictilini is a tribe of cicadas in the family Cicadidae, found in Australia. There are at least three genera in Pictilini.

== Genera ==
These three genera belong to the tribe Pictilini:

- Amica Moulds & Marshall, 2025
- Chrysocicada Boulard, 1989^{c g}
- Pictila Moulds, 2012^{c g}

Data sources: i = ITIS, c = Catalogue of Life, g = GBIF, b = Bugguide.net
